= Torreadrada =

- Municipality
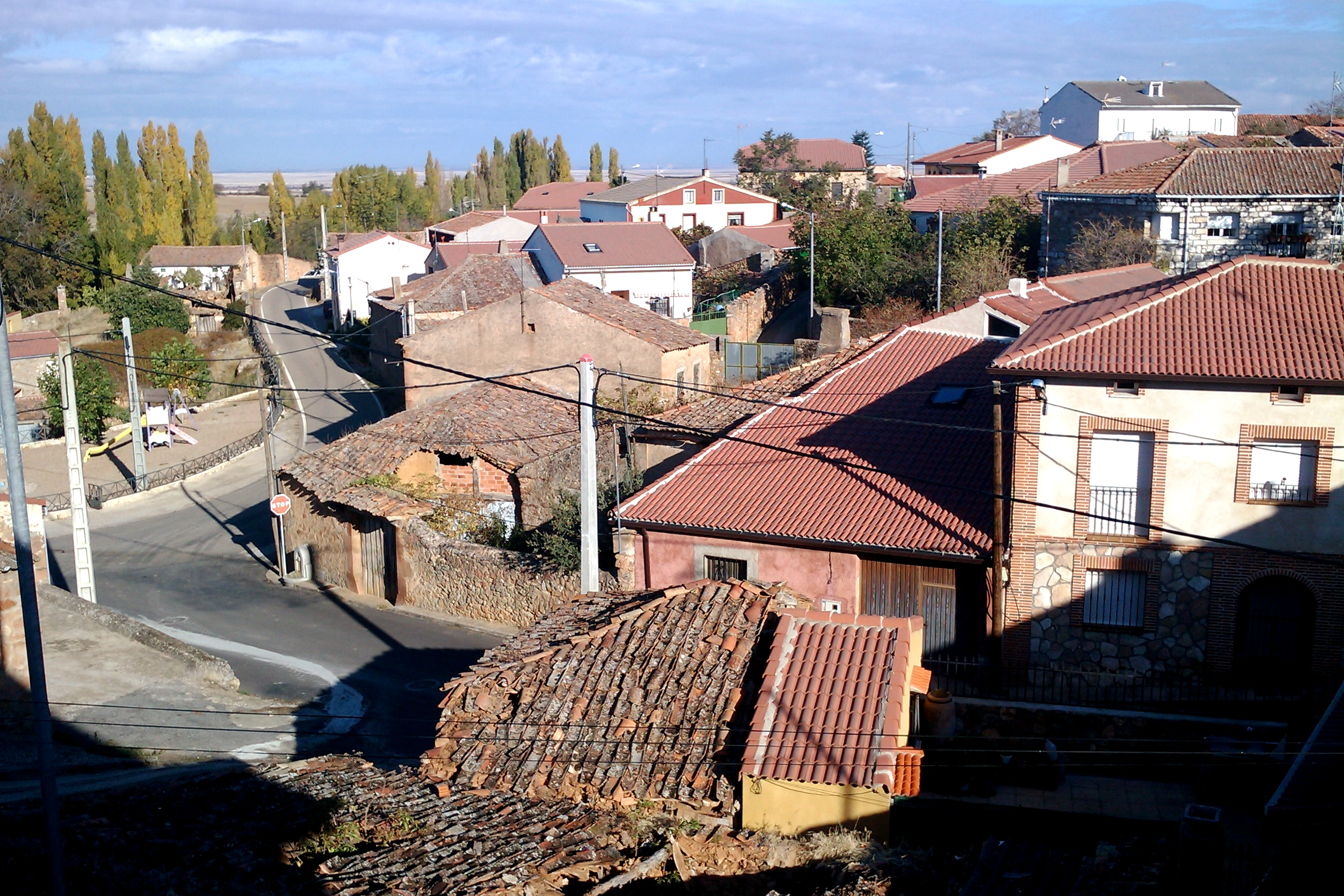

- Location in Spain. Torreadrada (Spain)
- Coordinates: 41°26′39″N 3°50′23″W
- Country: Spain
- Autonomous community: Castile and León
- Province: Segovia
- Municipality: Torreadrada

Area
  - Total: 32.86 km^{2} (12.69 sq mi)
- Elevation: 1,086 m (3,563 ft)

Population (2025-01-01)
  - Total: 53
  - Density: 1.6/km^{2} (4.2/sq mi)
- Time zone: UTC+1 (CET)
  - Summer (DST): UTC+2 (CEST)
- Website: Official website

Torreadrada is a municipality located in the province of Segovia, Castile and León, Spain. The town is located about 83 kilometers northeast of Segovia, between Castro de Fuentidueña and Aldeanueva de la Serrezuela. According to the 2010 census (INE), the municipality had a population of 105 inhabitants.
