= Corral de Ayllón =

- Municipality
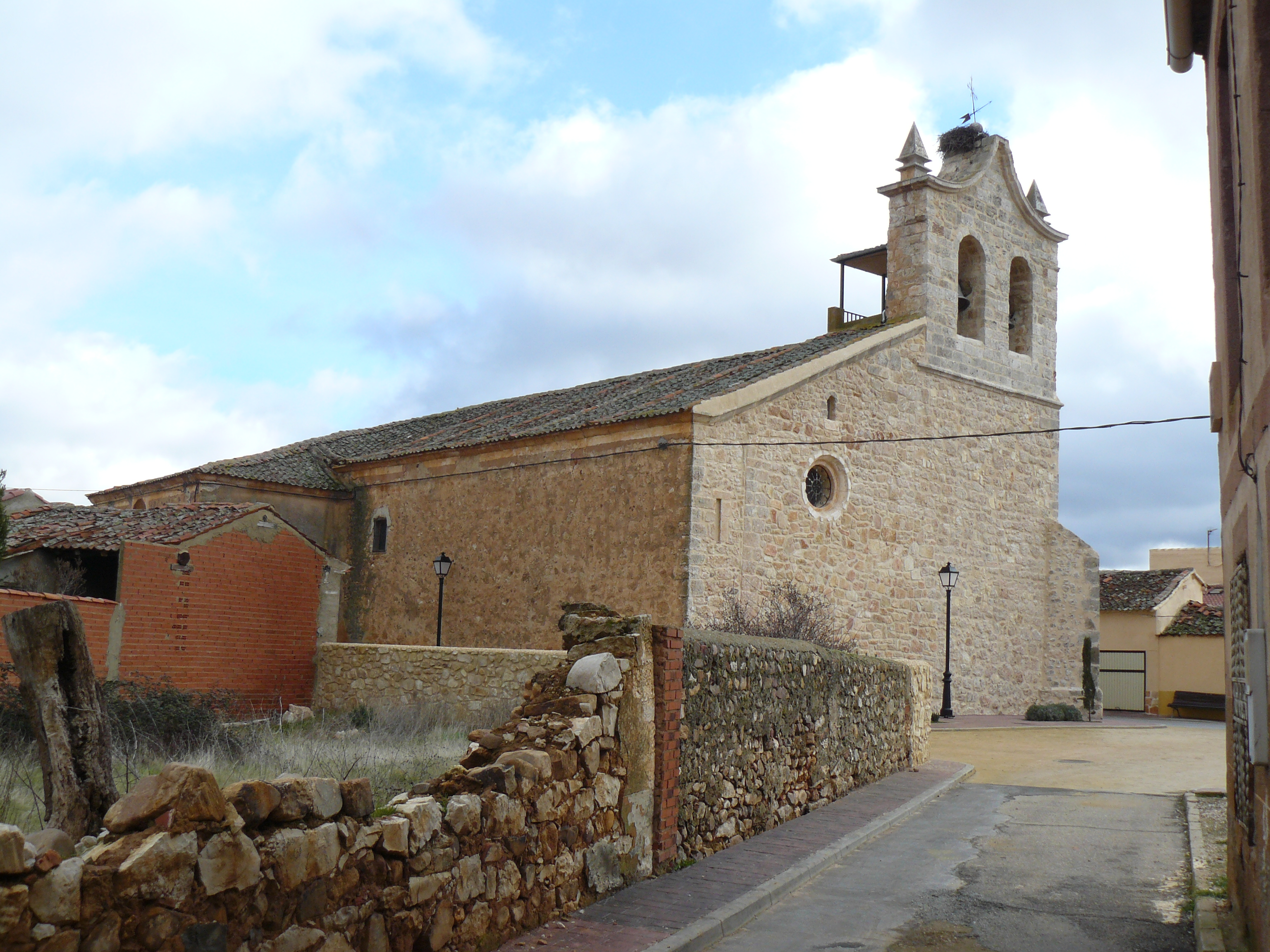

- Location in Spain. Corral de Ayllón (Spain)
- Coordinates: 41°23′29″N 3°27′34″W
- Country: Spain
- Autonomous community: Castile and León
- Province: Segovia
- Municipality: Corral de Ayllón

Area
  - Total: 18 km^{2} (6.9 sq mi)

Population (2025-01-01)
  - Total: 76
  - Density: 4.2/km^{2} (11/sq mi)
- Time zone: UTC+1 (CET)
  - Summer (DST): UTC+2 (CEST)
- Website: Official website

Corral de Ayllón is a municipality located in the province of Segovia, Castile and León, Spain. According to the 2004 census (INE), the municipality has a population of 97 inhabitants.

== Airfield ==
In this small town can find the airfield of La Nava, dedicated to the private flight and especially gliding. It has over two million square meters. It was built during the Spanish Civil War on the side of nationals, supported by the German Air Force, sought an alternative basis for the operation of the Condor Legion.

== History ==
Formerly named as el Corral'. Corral de Ayllón was part of the Comunidad de Villa y Tierra de Ayllon

== Demographics ==
Historical population
Year	2000	2002	2004	2006	2008
Pop.	106	97	89	85	109
±%	—	−8.5%	−8.2%	−4.5%	+28.2%

== See also ==
- Comunidad de Villa y Tierra de Ayllón
- La Nava airfield
