= Province of Segovia =

Province of Spain

Province of Segovia Provincia de Segovia
- Province
- Flag Coat of arms

- Location of the Province of Segovia in Spain
- Coordinates: 41°10′N 4°00′W
- Country: Spain
- Autonomous community: Castile and León
- Capital: Segovia
- Municipalities: 209 (list)

Government
  - Type: Diputación
  - Body: Provincial Deputation of Segovia

Area
  - Total: 6,922.58 km^{2} (2,672.82 sq mi)
  - Rank: 37th in Spain
- 1.4% of Spain
- Highest elevation (Peñalara): 2,428 m (7,966 ft)

Population (2025)
  - Total: 158,251
  - Rank: 48th in Spain
  - Density: 22.8601/km^{2} (59.2074/sq mi)
- 0.3% of Spain
- Demonym: Segoviano/a
- Time zone: UTC+1 (CET)
  - Summer (DST): UTC+2 (CEST)
- Website: Official website

Segovia (Spanish pronunciation: [seˈɣoβja]) is a province of central-northern Spain, in the southern part of the autonomous community of Castile and León. It is bordered by the province of Burgos in the north, Soria in the northeast, Guadalajara in the east, Madrid in the south, Ávila in the west and southwest, and Valladolid in the northwest.

It has a population of 158,251 in an area of 6,922.58 square kilometres (2,672.82 sq mi) across its 209 municipalities.

The average temperature ranges from 10 °C to 20 °C.

== Etymology ==
The name Segovia is thought to be of Celtic origin, derived from the indoeuropean root *seg-, similarly as Segontia, Segisamo, and Segobriga.

== Administration ==
The provincial corporation consists of 25 elected members. After the recent elections there are 10 members of the Spanish Socialist Workers Party and 15 of the People's Party.

=== Municipalities ===
The province has 209 municipalities:

- Abades
- Adrada de Pirón
- Adrados
- Aguilafuente
- Alconada de Maderuelo
- Aldea Real
- Aldealcorvo
- Aldealengua de Pedraza
- Aldealengua de Santa María
- Aldeanueva de la Serrezuela
- Aldeanueva del Codonal
- Aldeasoña
- Aldehorno
- Aldehuela del Codonal
- Aldeonte
- Anaya
- Añe
- Arahuetes
- Arcones
- Arevalillo de Cega
- Armuña
- Ayllón
- Barbolla
- Basardilla
- Bercial
- Bercimuel
- Bernardos
- Bernuy de Porreros
- Boceguillas
- Brieva
- Caballar
- Cabañas de Polendos
- Cabezuela
- Calabazas de Fuentidueña
- Campo de San Pedro
- Cantalejo
- Cantimpalos
- Carabias
- Carbonero el Mayor
- Carrascal del Río
- Casla
- Castillejo de Mesleón
- Castro de Fuentidueña
- Castrojimeno
- Castroserna de Abajo
- Castroserracín
- Cedillo de la Torre
- Cerezo de Abajo
- Cerezo de Arriba
- Cilleruelo de San Mamés
- Cobos de Fuentidueña
- Coca
- Codorniz
- Collado Hermoso
- Condado de Castilnovo
- Corral de Ayllón
- Cozuelos de Fuentidueña
- Cubillo
- Cuéllar
- Cuevas de Provanco
- Chañe
- Domingo García
- Donhierro
- Duruelo
- Encinas
- Encinillas
- Escalona del Prado
- Escarabajosa de Cabezas
- Escobar de Polendos
- El Espinar
- Espirdo
- Fresneda de Cuéllar
- Fresno de Cantespino
- Fresno de la Fuente
- Frumales
- Fuente de Santa Cruz
- Fuente el Olmo de Fuentidueña
- Fuente el Olmo de Íscar
- Fuentepelayo
- Fuentepiñel
- Fuenterrebollo
- Fuentesaúco de Fuentidueña
- Fuentesoto
- Fuentidueña
- Gallegos
- Garcillán
- Gomezserracín
- Grajera
- Honrubia de la Cuesta
- Hontalbilla
- Hontanares de Eresma
- Los Huertos
- Ituero y Lama
- Juarros de Riomoros
- Juarros de Voltoya
- Labajos
- Laguna de Contreras
- Languilla
- Lastras de Cuéllar
- Lastras del Pozo
- La Lastrilla
- La Losa
- Maderuelo
- Marazoleja
- Marazuela
- Martín Miguel
- Martín Muñoz de la Dehesa
- Martín Muñoz de las Posadas
- Marugán
- Mata de Cuéllar
- Matabuena
- La Matilla
- Melque de Cercos
- Membibre de la Hoz
- Migueláñez
- Montejo de Arévalo
- Montejo de la Vega de la Serrezuela
- Monterrubio
- Moral de Hornuez
- Mozoncillo
- Muñopedro
- Muñoveros
- Nava de la Asunción
- Navafría
- Navalilla
- Navalmanzano
- Navares de Ayuso
- Navares de Enmedio
- Navares de las Cuevas
- Navas de Oro
- Navas de Riofrío
- Navas de San Antonio
- Nieva
- Olombrada
- Orejana
- Ortigosa de Pestaño
- Ortigosa del Monte
- Otero de Herreros
- Pajarejos
- Palazuelos de Eresma
- Pedraza
- Pelayos del Arroyo
- Perosillo
- Pinarejos
- Pinarnegrillo
- Prádena
- Puebla de Pedraza
- Rapariegos
- Rebollo
- Remondo
- Riaguas de San Bartolomé
- Riaza
- Ribota
- Riofrío de Riaza
- Roda de Eresma
- Sacramenia
- Samboal
- San Cristóbal de Cuéllar
- San Cristóbal de la Vega
- San Cristóbal de Segovia
- Real Sitio de San Ildefonso
- San Martín y Mudrián
- San Miguel de Bernuy
- San Pedro de Gaíllos
- Sanchonuño
- Sangarcía
- Santa María la Real de Nieva
- Santa Marta del Cerro
- Santiuste de Pedraza
- Santiuste de San Juan Bautista
- Santo Domingo de Pirón
- Santo Tomé del Puerto
- Sauquillo de Cabezas
- Sebúlcor
- Segovia
- Sepúlveda
- Sequera de Fresno
- Sotillo
- Sotosalbos
- Tabanera la Luenga
- Tolocirio
- Torre Val de San Pedro
- Torreadrada
- Torrecaballeros
- Torrecilla del Pinar
- Torreiglesias
- Trescasas
- Turégano
- Urueñas
- Valdeprados
- Valdevacas de Montejo
- Valdevacas y Guijar
- Valseca
- Valtiendas
- Valverde del Majano
- Valle de Tabladillo
- Vallelado
- Valleruela de Pedraza
- Valleruela de Sepúlveda
- Veganzones
- Vegas de Matute
- Ventosilla y Tejadilla
- Villacastín
- Villaverde de Íscar
- Villaverde de Montejo
- Villeguillo
- Yanguas de Eresma
- Zarzuela del Monte
- Zarzuela del Pinar

== Demographics ==
Historical population
Year	Pop.	±%
1842	103,787	—
1857	146,839	+41.5%
1877	151,260	+3.0%
1887	155,941	+3.1%
1900	162,760	+4.4%
1910	173,602	+6.7%
1920	174,205	+0.3%
1930	183,609	+5.4%
1940	194,184	+5.8%
1950	203,488	+4.8%
1960	201,794	−0.8%
1970	162,106	−19.7%
1981	149,361	−7.9%
1991	147,188	−1.5%
2001	147,694	+0.3%
2011	163,171	+10.5%
2021	153,626	−5.8%
Source: INE

As of 2025, the population is 158,251, of which 50.2% are male, and 49.8% are female. Minors make up 15.0% of the population, and seniors make up 23.8%.

=== Immigration ===
As of 2025, immigrants make up 17.3% of the population. The 5 largest foreign countries of birth are Bulgaria, Morocco, Colombia, Romania, and Honduras.

== Economy ==
Tourism is one of the most important industries. In July 2014, the provincial government signed an agreement with Bankia which will contribute 10,000 euros to promote the province's tourism industry.

Agriculture also contributes significantly to the province's gross domestic product. Wheat, barley, rye and rice have been the most important cereals. During the seventeenth century many of the province's towns recorded decline in cereal production.

Cattle rearing is also an important commercial activity.

== Sights ==
The historical heritage of this province is rich and varied. The capital city has the 800-metre-long Roman Aqueduct of Segovia, which is unique to the province. The capital was declared a world heritage site in 1985. The villages of Sepúlveda, Ayllón, Pedraza, Coca and La Granja de San Ildefonso attract a large number of tourists. La Granja de San Ildefonso houses a national monument–The Royal Palace. Antonio Machado's house is located in Ayllón.

== See also ==
- List of municipalities in Segovia
