= Encinillas =

- Municipality
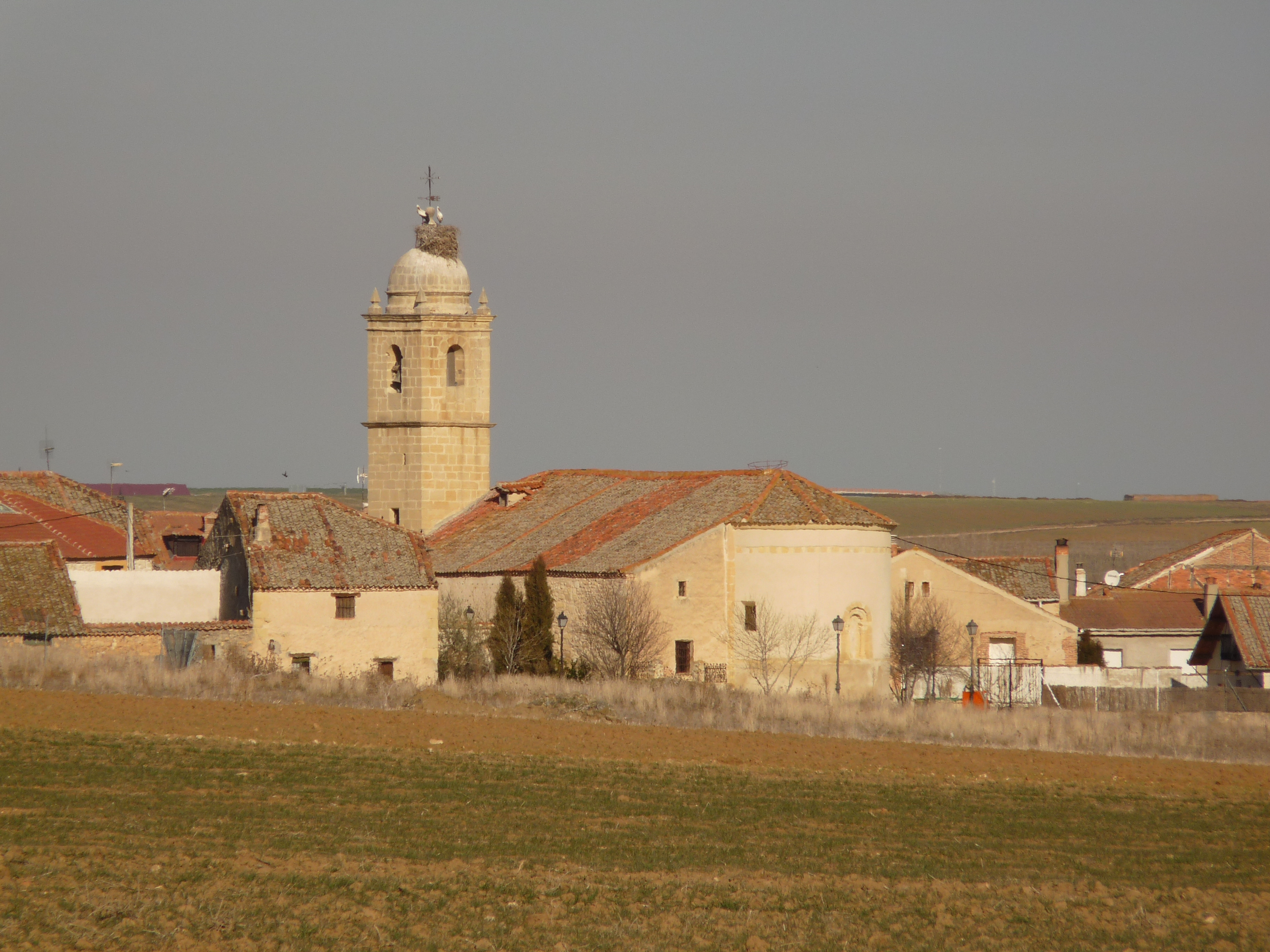
- View of Encinillas

- Location in Spain. Encinillas (Spain)
- Coordinates: 41°01′04″N 4°09′29″W
- Country: Spain
- Autonomous community: Castile and León
- Province: Segovia
- Municipality: Encinillas

Area
  - Total: 8 km^{2} (3.1 sq mi)

Population (2025-01-01)
  - Total: 358
  - Density: 45/km^{2} (120/sq mi)
- Time zone: UTC+1 (CET)
  - Summer (DST): UTC+2 (CEST)
- Website: Official website

Encinillas is a municipality located in the province of Segovia, Castile and León, Spain. According to the 2004 census (INE), the municipality has a population of 83 inhabitants.
