= Aldea Real =

- Municipality
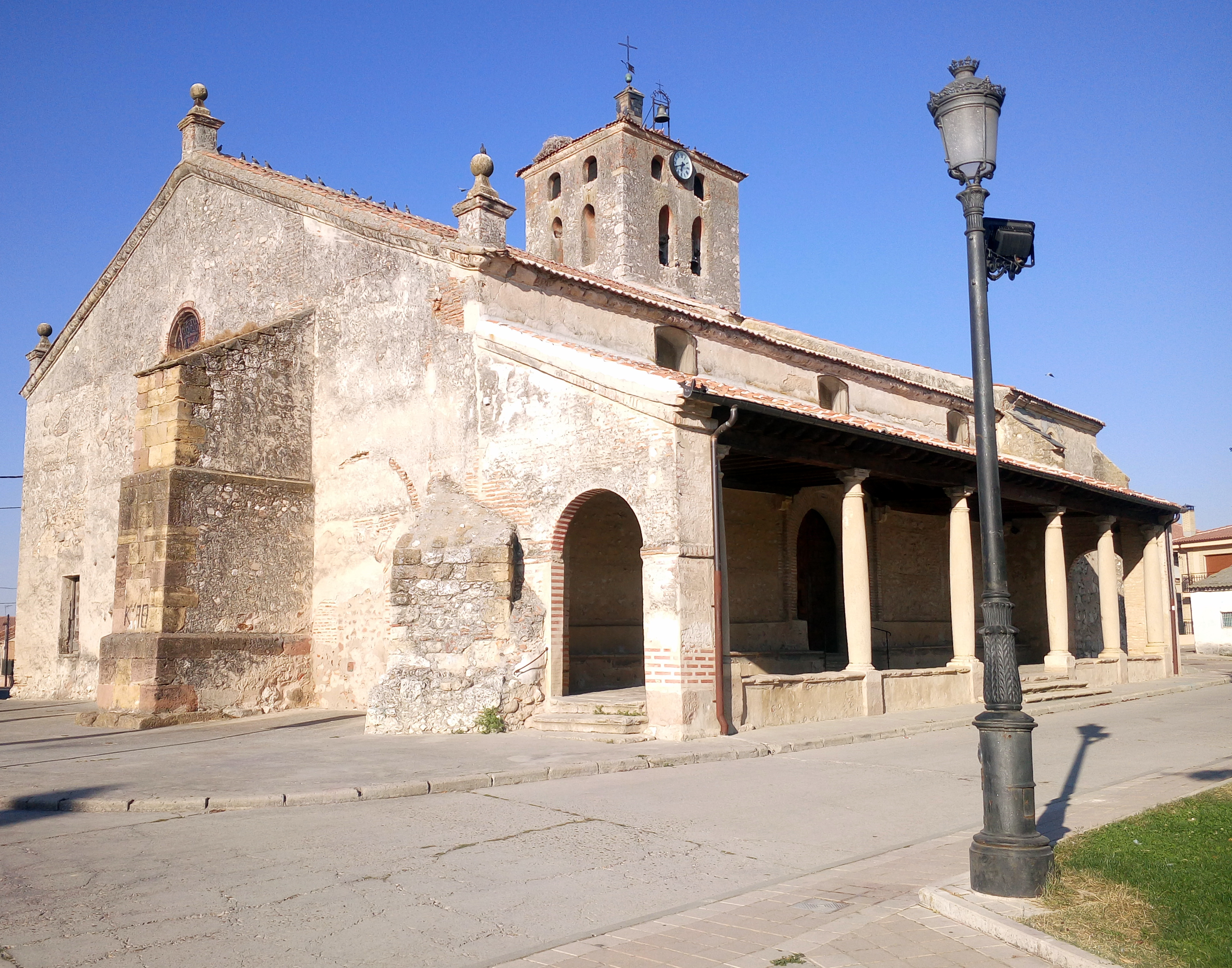

- Flag Coat of arms

- Aldea Real within Segovia

- Location in Spain. Aldea Real (Spain)
- Coordinates: 41°11′06″N 4°09′56″W
- Country: Spain
- Autonomous community: Castile and León
- Province: Segovia
- Municipality: Aldea Real

Area
  - Total: 25.28 km^{2} (9.76 sq mi)
- Elevation: 881 m (2,890 ft)

Population (2025-01-01)
  - Total: 275
  - Density: 10.9/km^{2} (28.2/sq mi)
- Time zone: UTC+1 (CET)
  - Summer (DST): UTC+2 (CEST)
- Website: Official website

Aldea Real is a municipality located in the province of Segovia, Castile and León, Spain. According to the 2004 census (INE), the municipality had a population of 383 inhabitants.
