= Muñopedro =

- Municipality
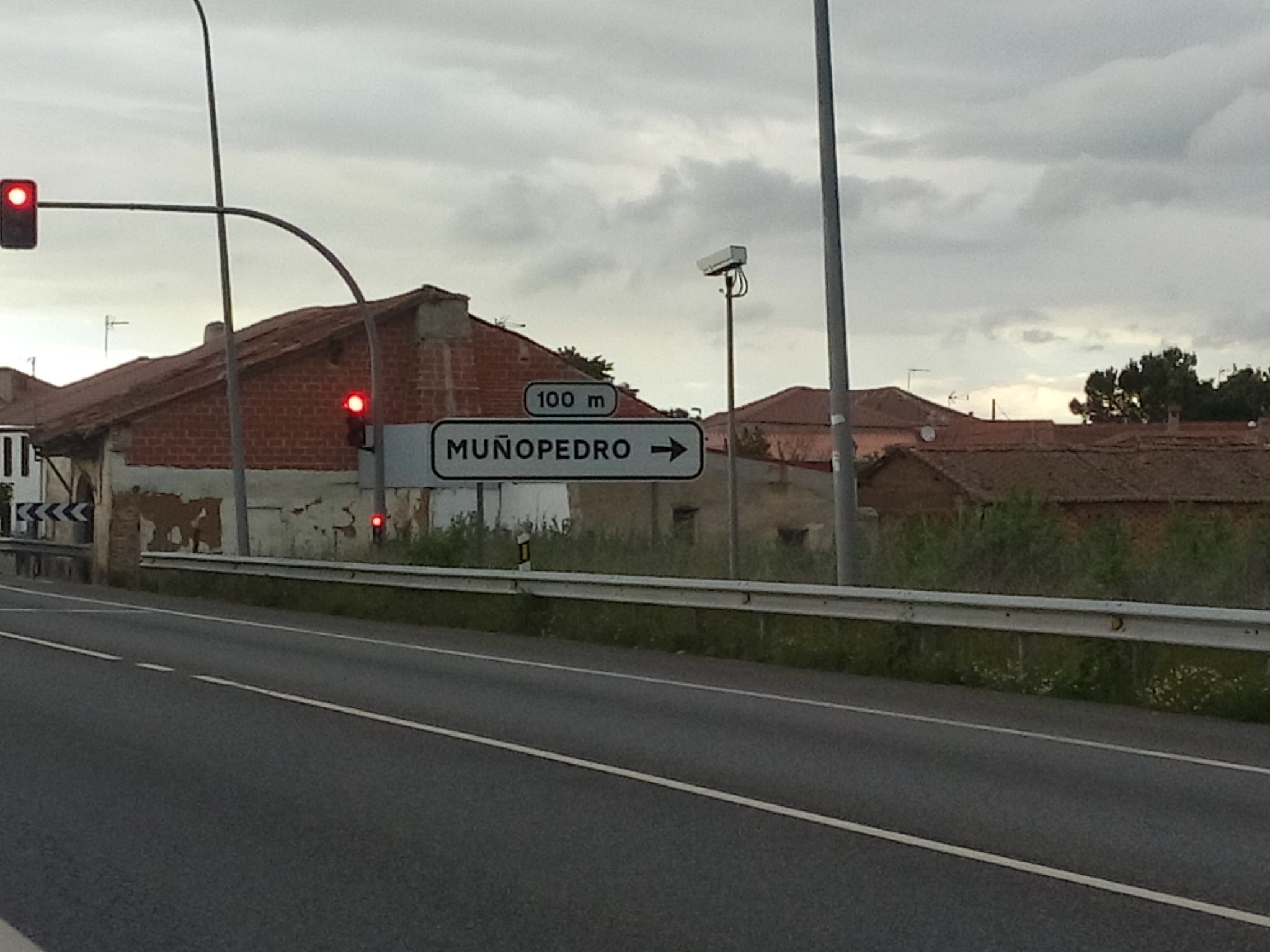
- Muñopedro (Segovia)

- Flag Coat of arms

- Location in Spain. Muñopedro (Spain)
- Coordinates: 40°53′17″N 4°28′18″W
- Country: Spain
- Autonomous community: Castile and León
- Province: Segovia
- Municipality: Muñopedro

Area
  - Total: 87 km^{2} (34 sq mi)

Population (2025-01-01)
  - Total: 298
  - Density: 3.4/km^{2} (8.9/sq mi)
- Time zone: UTC+1 (CET)
  - Summer (DST): UTC+2 (CEST)
- Website: Official website

Muñopedro is a municipality located in the province of Segovia, Castile and León, Spain. As of 2025, the municipality had a population of 298.
