= Roda de Eresma =

- Municipality
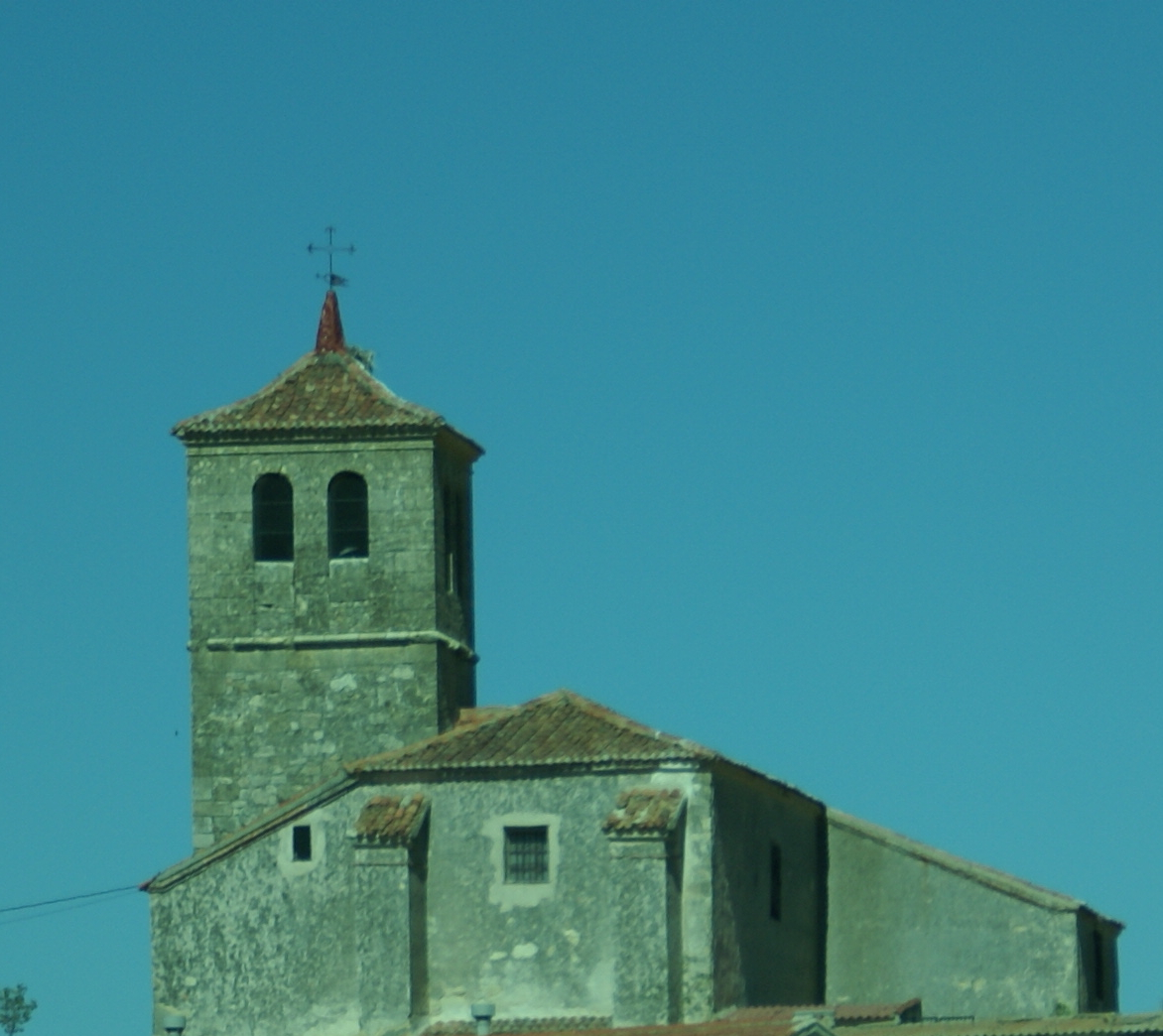
- Church of Nuestra Señora de la Asunción.

- Location in Spain. Roda de Eresma (Spain)
- Coordinates: 41°01′41″N 4°10′54″W
- Country: Spain
- Autonomous community: Castile and León
- Province: Segovia
- Municipality: Roda de Eresma

Area
  - Total: 10 km^{2} (3.9 sq mi)

Population (2025-01-01)
  - Total: 260
  - Density: 26/km^{2} (67/sq mi)
- Time zone: UTC+1 (CET)
  - Summer (DST): UTC+2 (CEST)
- Website: Official website

Roda de Eresma is a municipality located in the province of Segovia, Castile and León, Spain. According to the 2021 census (INE), the municipality has a population of 201 inhabitants.
