= Campo de San Pedro =

- Municipality
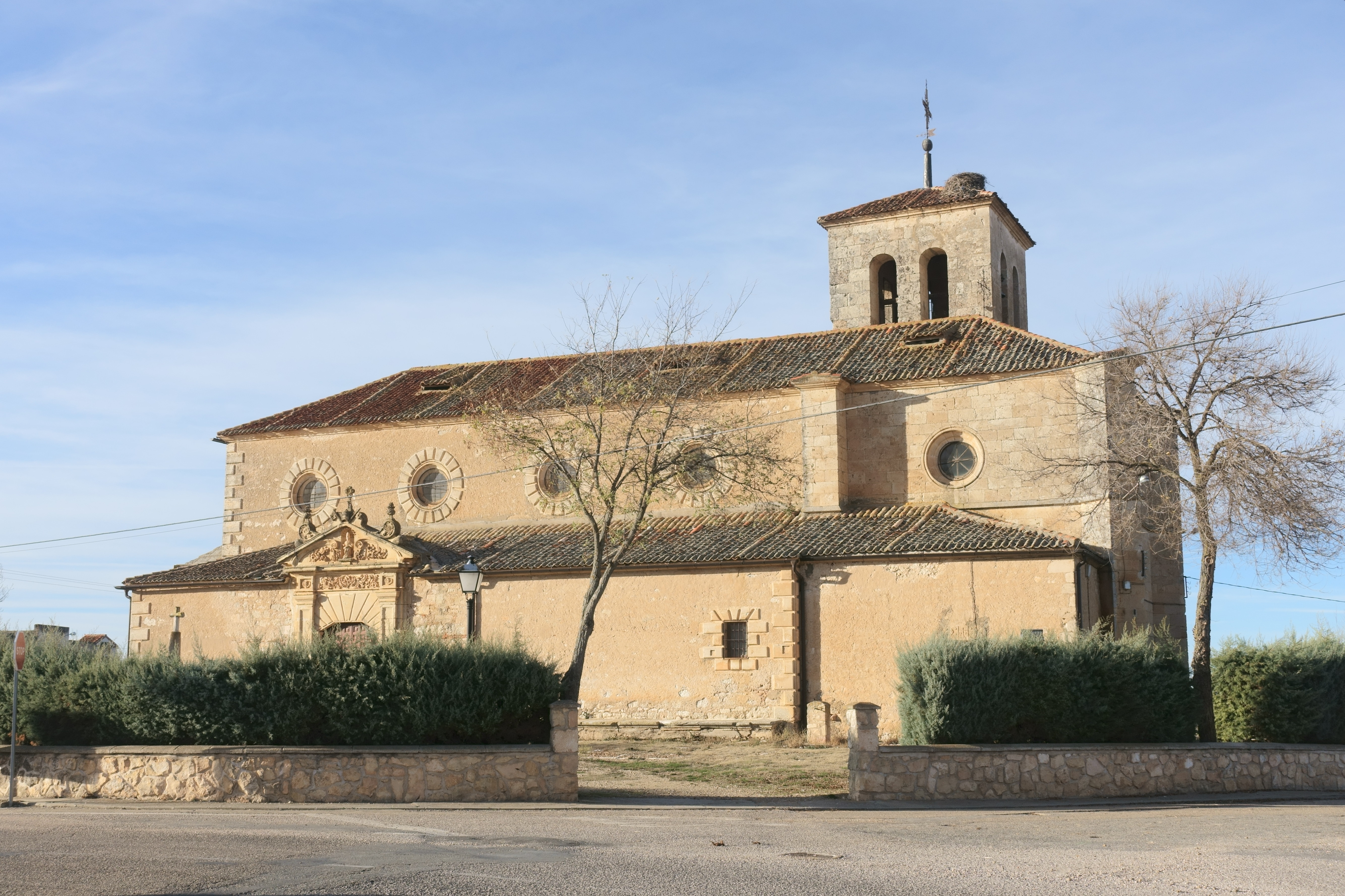
- Church of Campo de San Pedro Town

- Location in Spain. Campo de San Pedro (Spain)
- Coordinates: 41°25′46″N 3°32′44″W
- Country: Spain
- Autonomous community: Castile and León
- Province: Segovia
- Municipality: Campo de San Pedro

Area
  - Total: 37 km^{2} (14 sq mi)

Population (2025-01-01)
  - Total: 257
  - Density: 6.9/km^{2} (18/sq mi)
- Time zone: UTC+1 (CET)
  - Summer (DST): UTC+2 (CEST)
- Website: Official website

Campo de San Pedro is a municipality located in the province of Segovia, Castile and León, Spain. According to the 2004 census (INE), the municipality has a population of 354 inhabitants.
