= Santiuste de Pedraza =

- Municipality
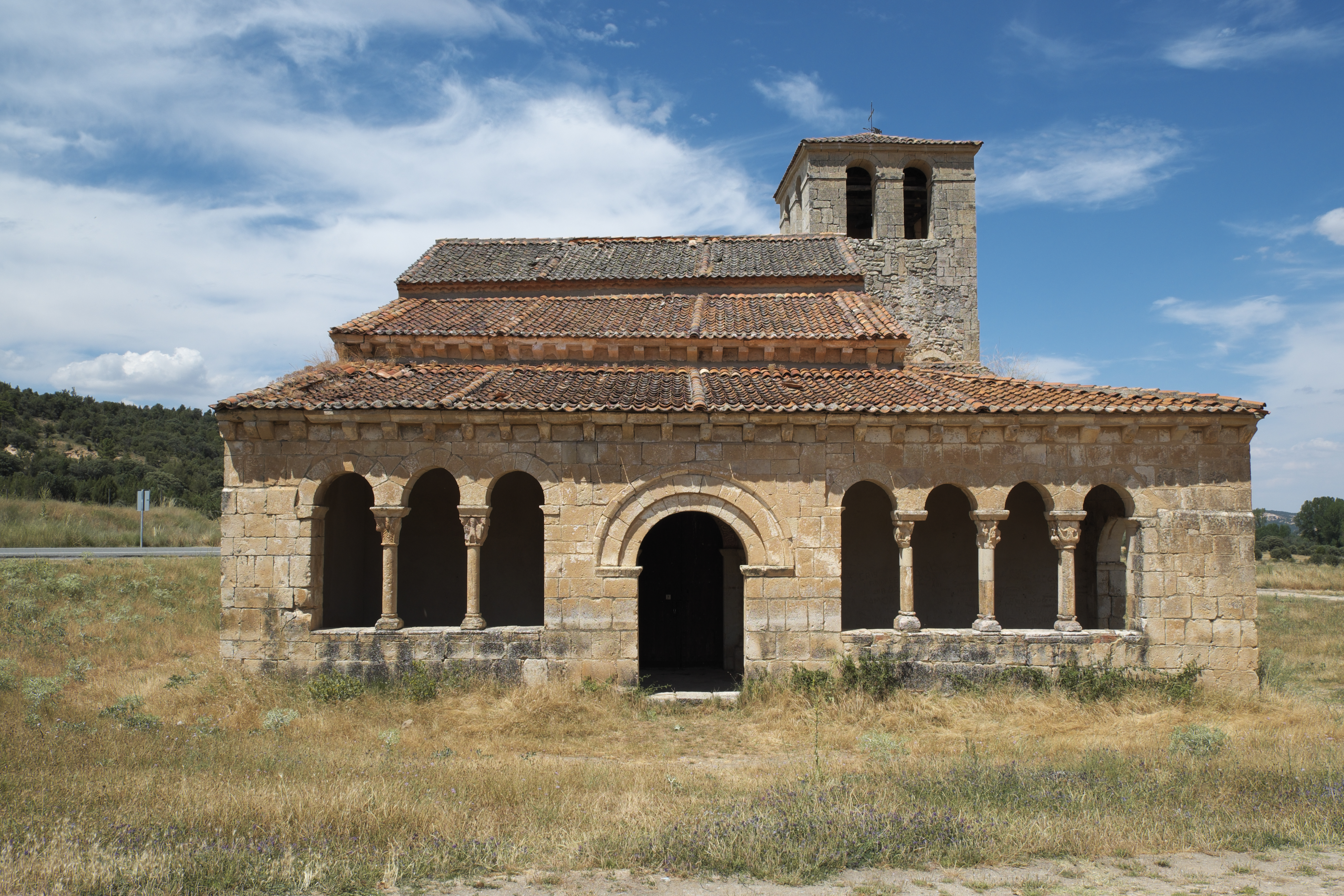

- Location in Spain. Santiuste de Pedraza (Spain)
- Coordinates: 41°05′26″N 3°53′11″W
- Country: Spain
- Autonomous community: Castile and León
- Province: Segovia
- Municipality: Santiuste de Pedraza

Area
  - Total: 29.14 km^{2} (11.25 sq mi)
- Elevation: 1,108 m (3,635 ft)

Population (2025-01-01)
  - Total: 81
  - Density: 2.8/km^{2} (7.2/sq mi)
- Time zone: UTC+1 (CET)
  - Summer (DST): UTC+2 (CEST)
- Website: Official website

Santiuste de Pedraza is a municipality located in the province of Segovia, Castile and León, Spain. According to the 2004 census (INE), the municipality had a population of 119 inhabitants.
