= Riofrío de Riaza =

- Municipality
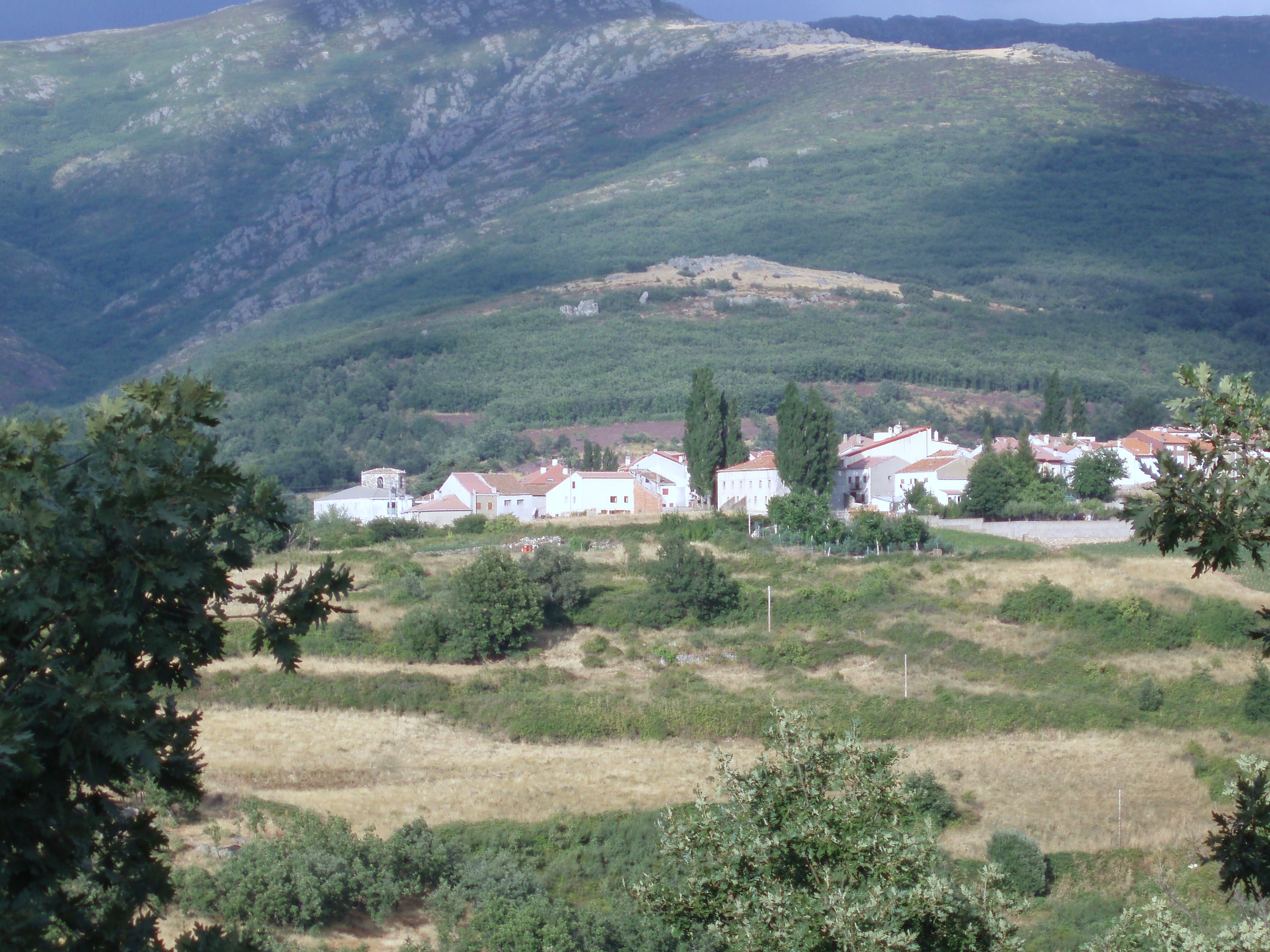
- View of Ríofrío de Riaza

- Location in Spain. Riofrío de Riaza (Spain)
- Coordinates: 41°14′50″N 3°27′01″W
- Country: Spain
- Autonomous community: Castile and León
- Province: Segovia
- Municipality: Riofrío de Riaza

Area
  - Total: 27 km^{2} (10 sq mi)

Population (2025-01-01)
  - Total: 29
  - Density: 1.1/km^{2} (2.8/sq mi)
- Time zone: UTC+1 (CET)
  - Summer (DST): UTC+2 (CEST)
- Website: Official website

Riofrío de Riaza is a municipality located in the province of Segovia, Castile and León, Spain. According to the 2004 census (INE), the municipality has a population of 55 inhabitants. Riofrío de Riazahas has oak and beech forests, high mountain vegetation, and places with views of the central system and the province of Segovia. Although there are no officially marked or marked routes, there are numerous routes that are popular with hikers and visitors.
