= Sequera de Fresno =

- Municipality
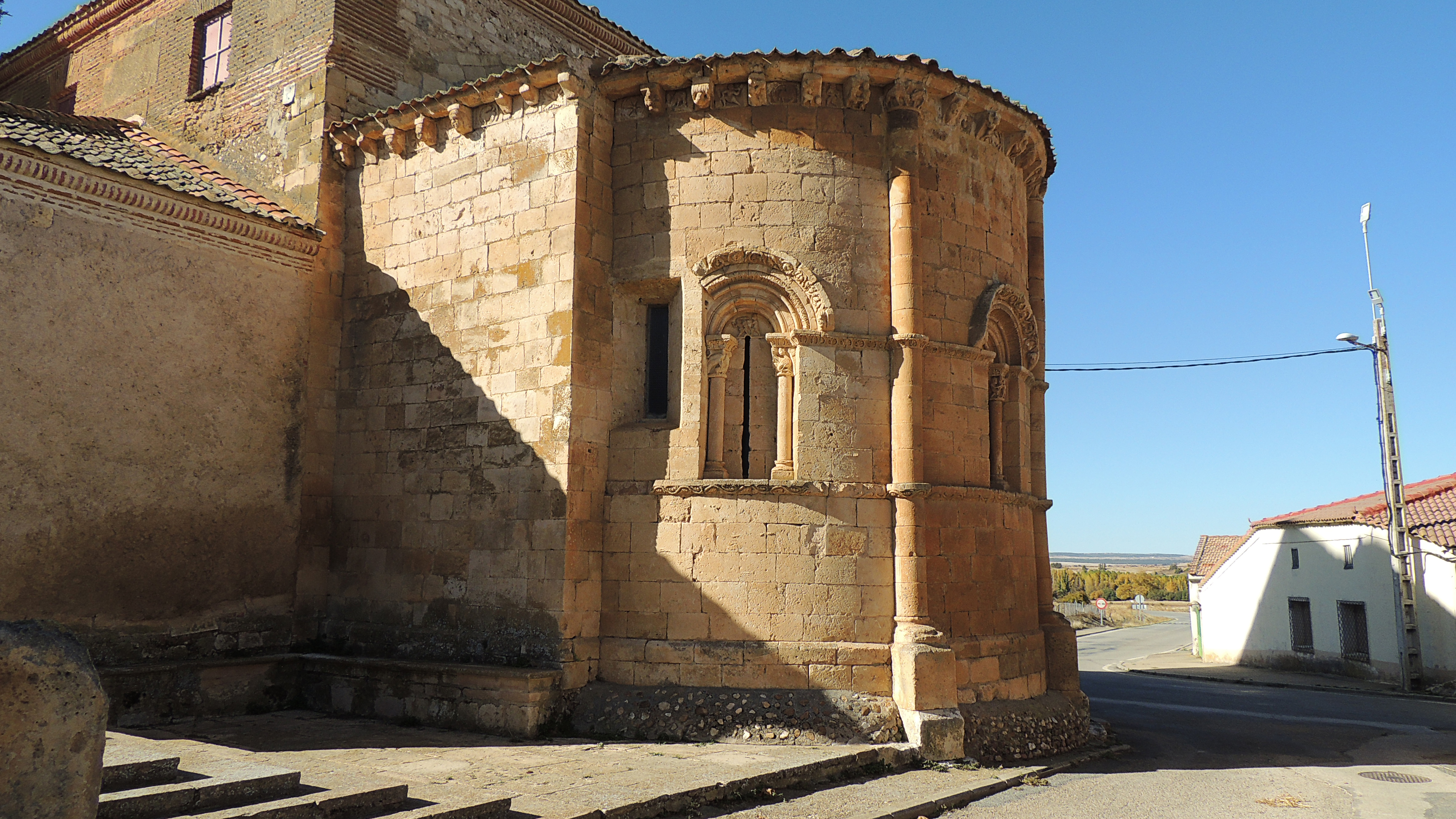
- Church of Our Lady of the Assumption in Sequera del Fresno

- Location in Spain. Sequera de Fresno (Spain)
- Coordinates: 41°22′00″N 3°32′46″W
- Country: Spain
- Autonomous community: Castile and León
- Province: Segovia
- Municipality: Sequera de Fresno

Area
  - Total: 13 km^{2} (5.0 sq mi)

Population (2025-01-01)
  - Total: 42
  - Density: 3.2/km^{2} (8.4/sq mi)
- Time zone: UTC+1 (CET)
  - Summer (DST): UTC+2 (CEST)
- Website: Official website

Sequera de Fresno is a municipality located in the province of Segovia, Castile and León, Spain. According to the 2004 census (INE), the municipality has a population of 43 inhabitants.
