= San Cristóbal de la Vega =

- Municipality
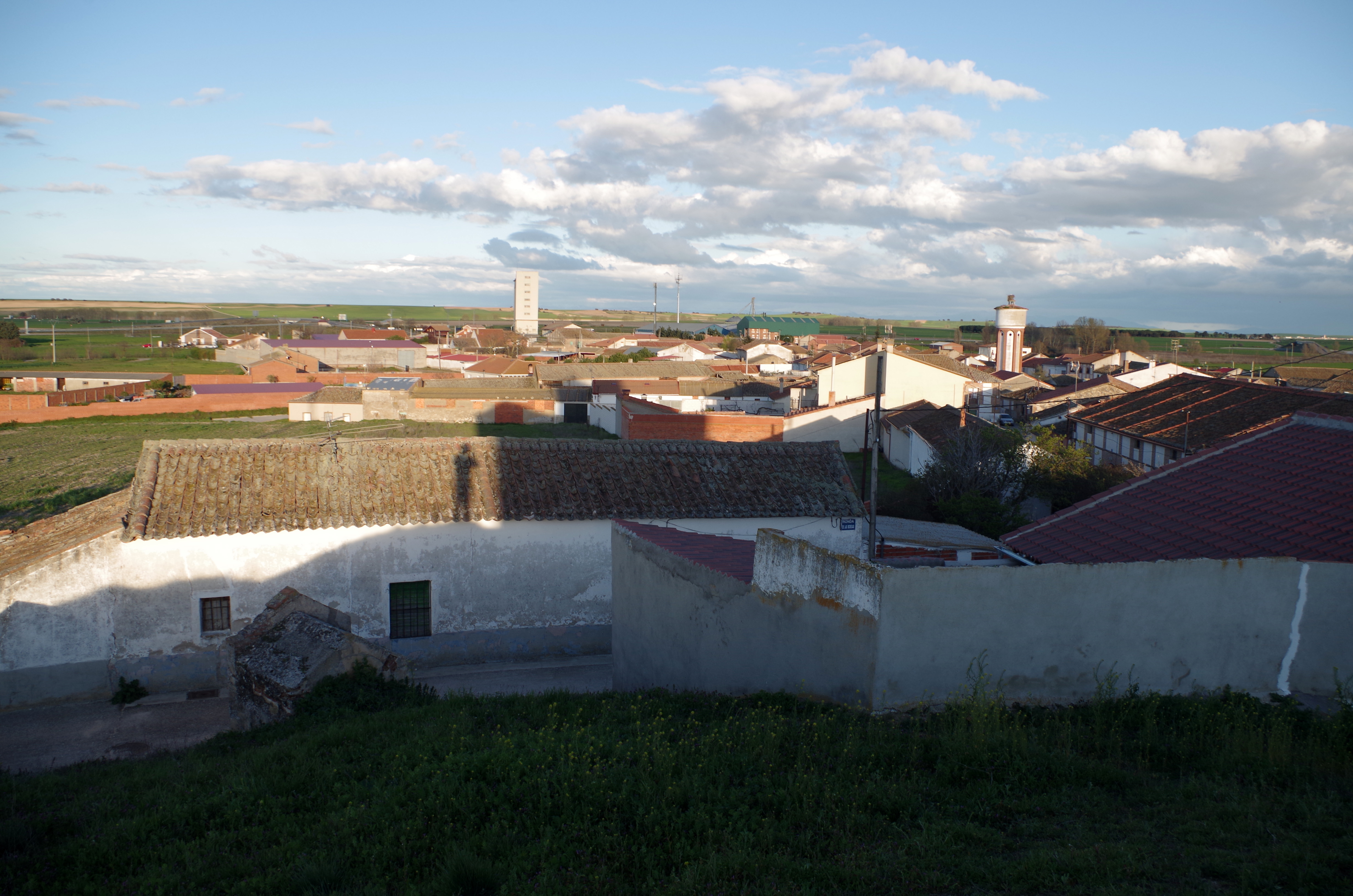

- Location in Spain. San Cristóbal de la Vega (Spain)
- Coordinates: 41°06′46″N 4°38′48″W
- Country: Spain
- Autonomous community: Castile and León
- Province: Segovia
- Municipality: San Cristóbal de la Vega

Area
  - Total: 15 km^{2} (5.8 sq mi)

Population (2025-01-01)
  - Total: 81
  - Density: 5.4/km^{2} (14/sq mi)
- Time zone: UTC+1 (CET)
  - Summer (DST): UTC+2 (CEST)
- Website: Official website

San Cristóbal de la Vega is a municipality located in the province of Segovia, Castile and León, Spain. According to the 2022 census (INE), the municipality has a population of 88 inhabitants.
