= Aguilafuente =

- Municipality
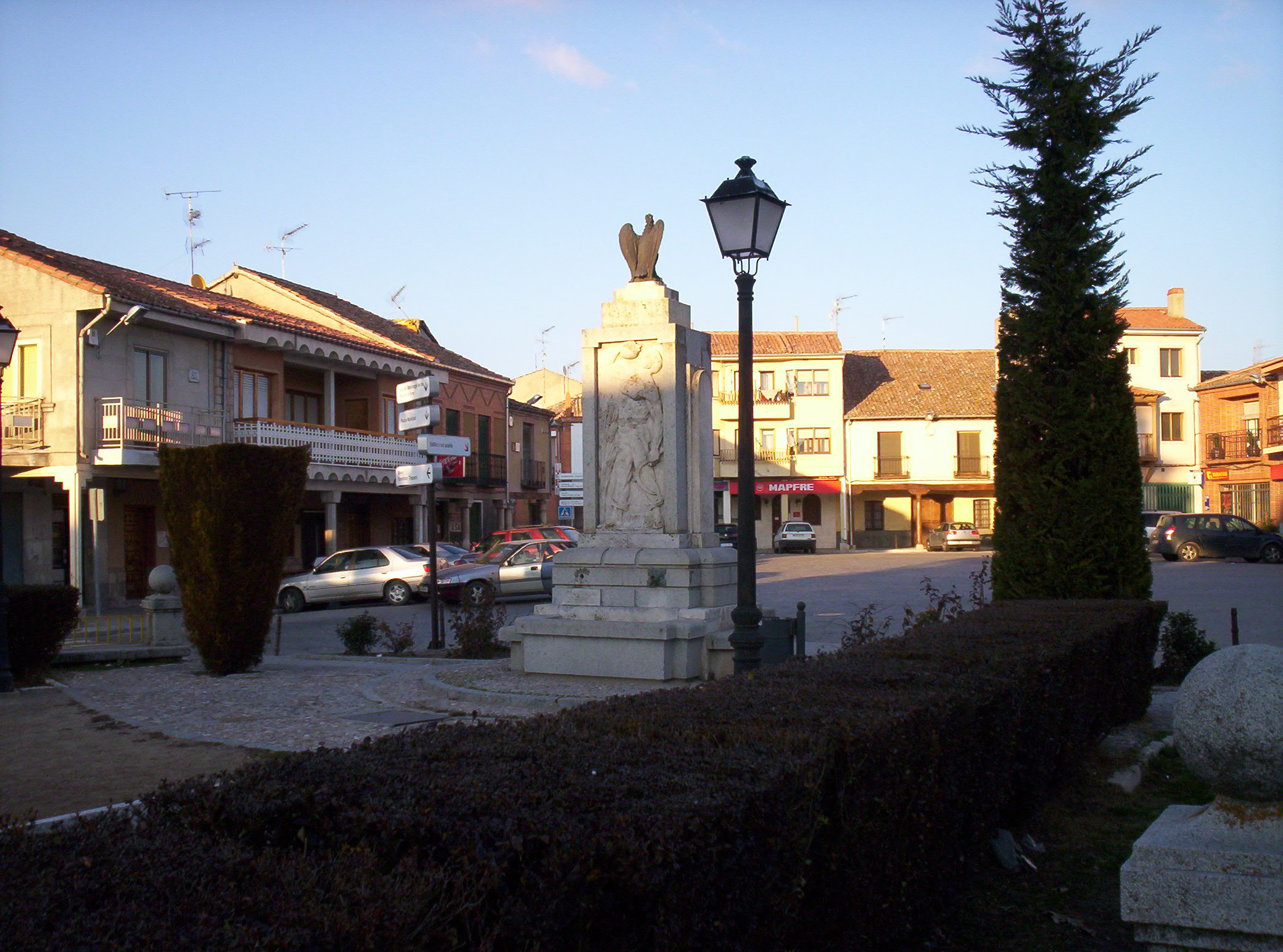

- Flag Coat of arms

- Location in Spain. Aguilafuente (Spain)
- Coordinates: 41°13′35″N 4°06′46″W
- Country: Spain
- Autonomous community: Castile and León
- Province: Segovia

Area
  - Total: 60.57 km^{2} (23.39 sq mi)
- Elevation: 879 m (2,884 ft)

Population (2025-01-01)
  - Total: 564
  - Density: 9.31/km^{2} (24.1/sq mi)
- Time zone: UTC+1 (CET)
  - Summer (DST): UTC+2 (CEST)

Aguilafuente is a municipality located in the province of Segovia, Castile and León, Spain. According to the 2004 census (INE), the municipality had a population of 773 inhabitants.

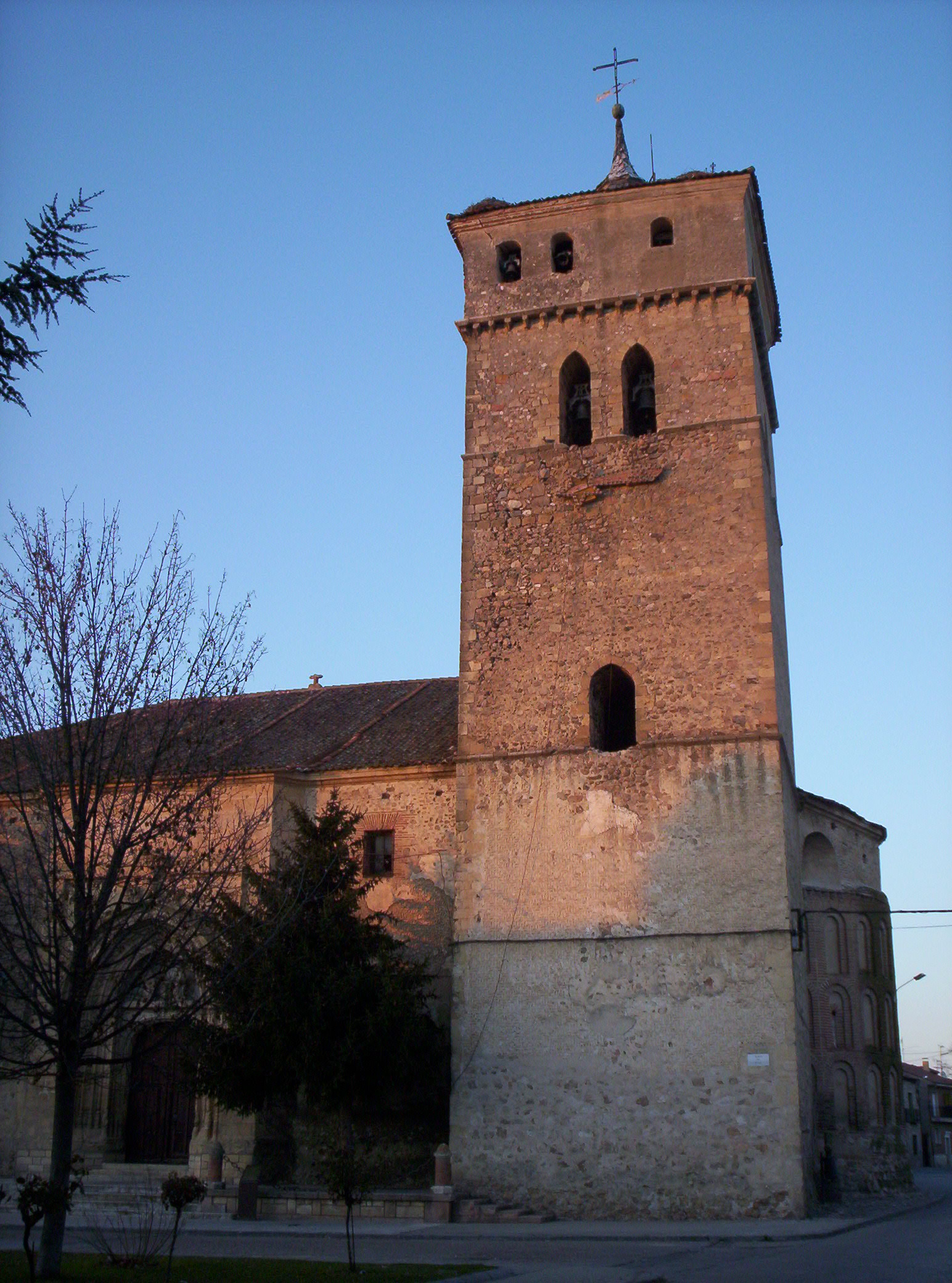
Church of Santa María, of mudéjar and romanic style.

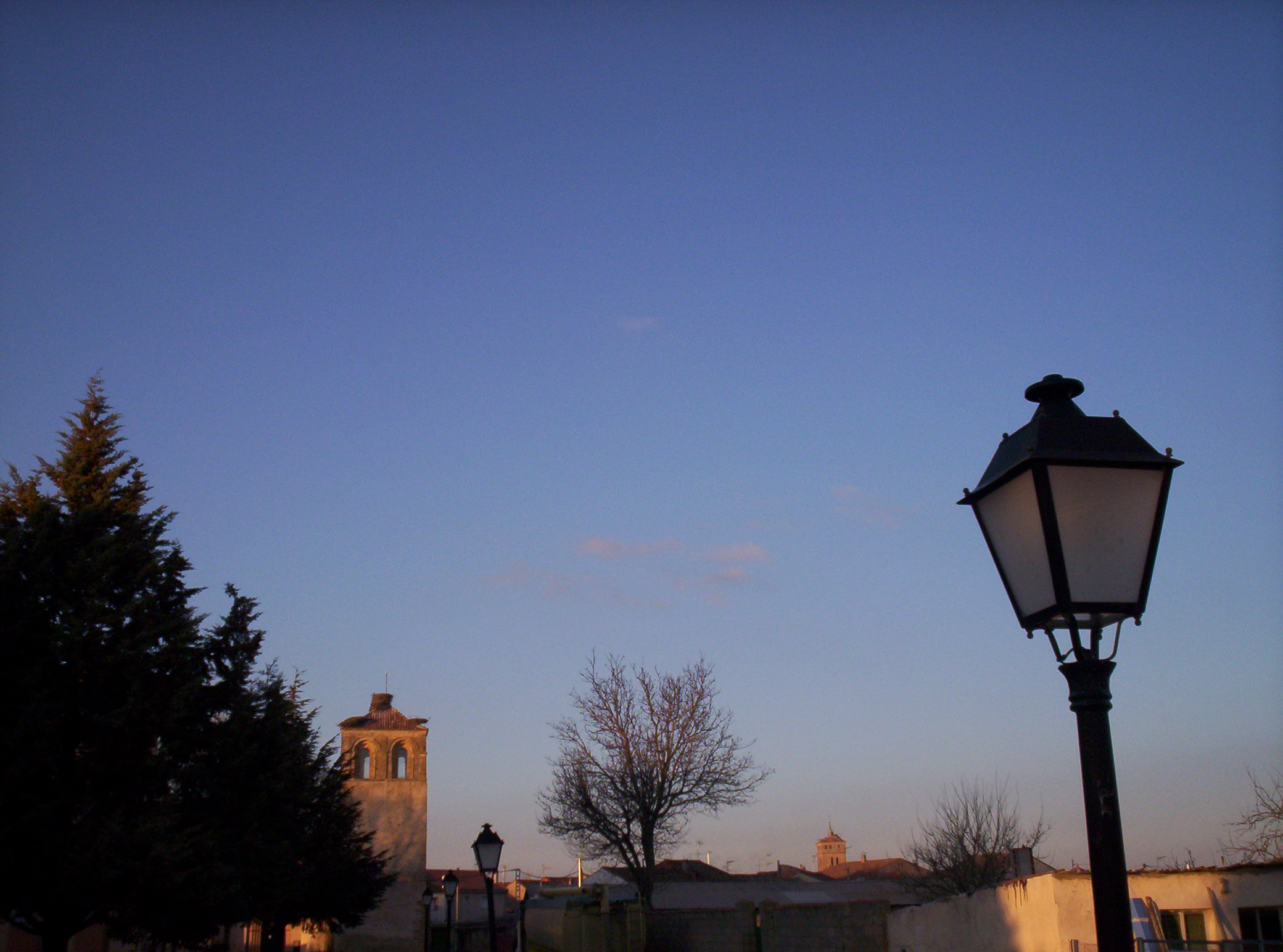
As seen from southwest, with the San Juan towers, at left; and Santa María, at back.

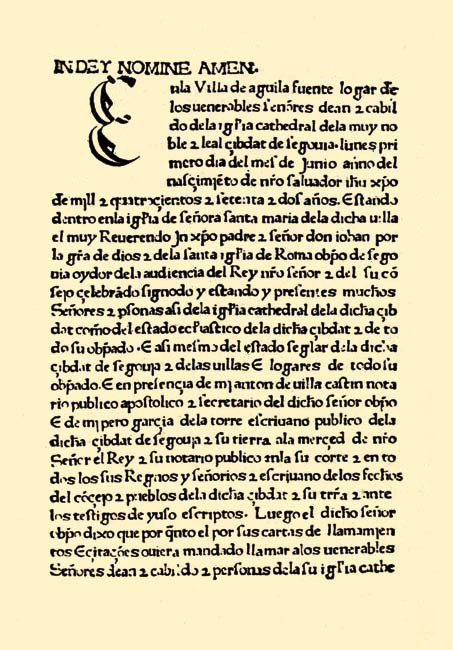
Sinodal de Aguilafuente (Juan Párix, 1472).

== See also ==
- List of municipalities in Segovia
