= Santiuste de San Juan Bautista =

- Municipality
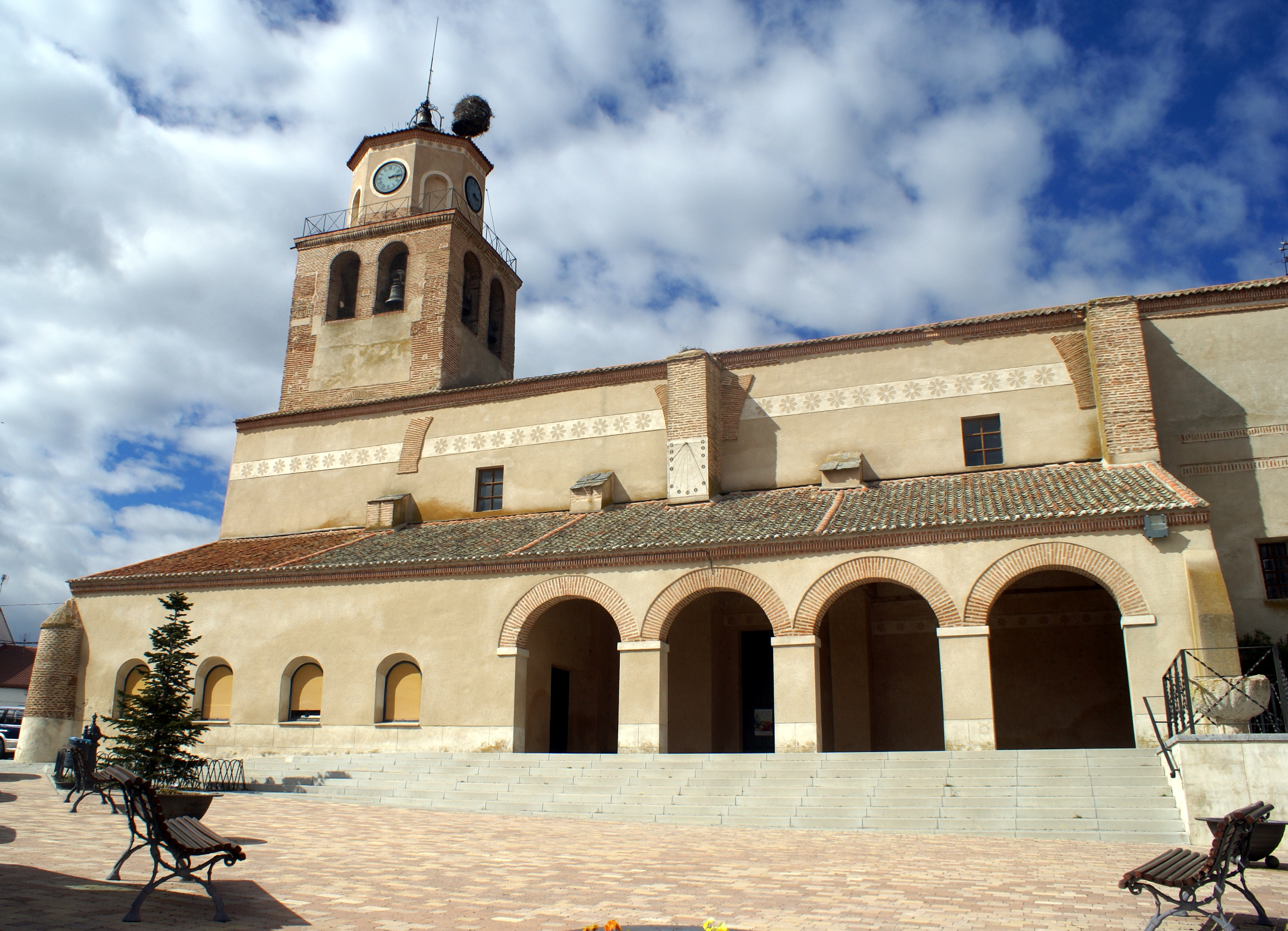
- The Church of Santiuste de San Juan Bautista

- Flag Coat of arms

- Location in Spain. Santiuste de San Juan Bautista (Spain)
- Coordinates: 41°09′25″N 4°34′19″W
- Country: Spain
- Autonomous community: Castile and León
- Province: Segovia
- Municipality: Santiuste de San Juan Bautista

Area
  - Total: 45 km^{2} (17 sq mi)

Population (2025-01-01)
  - Total: 534
  - Density: 12/km^{2} (31/sq mi)
- Time zone: UTC+1 (CET)
  - Summer (DST): UTC+2 (CEST)
- Website: Official website

Santiuste de San Juan Bautista is a municipality located in the province of Segovia, Castile and León, Spain. According to the 2004 census (INE), the municipality has a population of 742 inhabitants.
