= Ventosilla y Tejadilla =

- Municipality
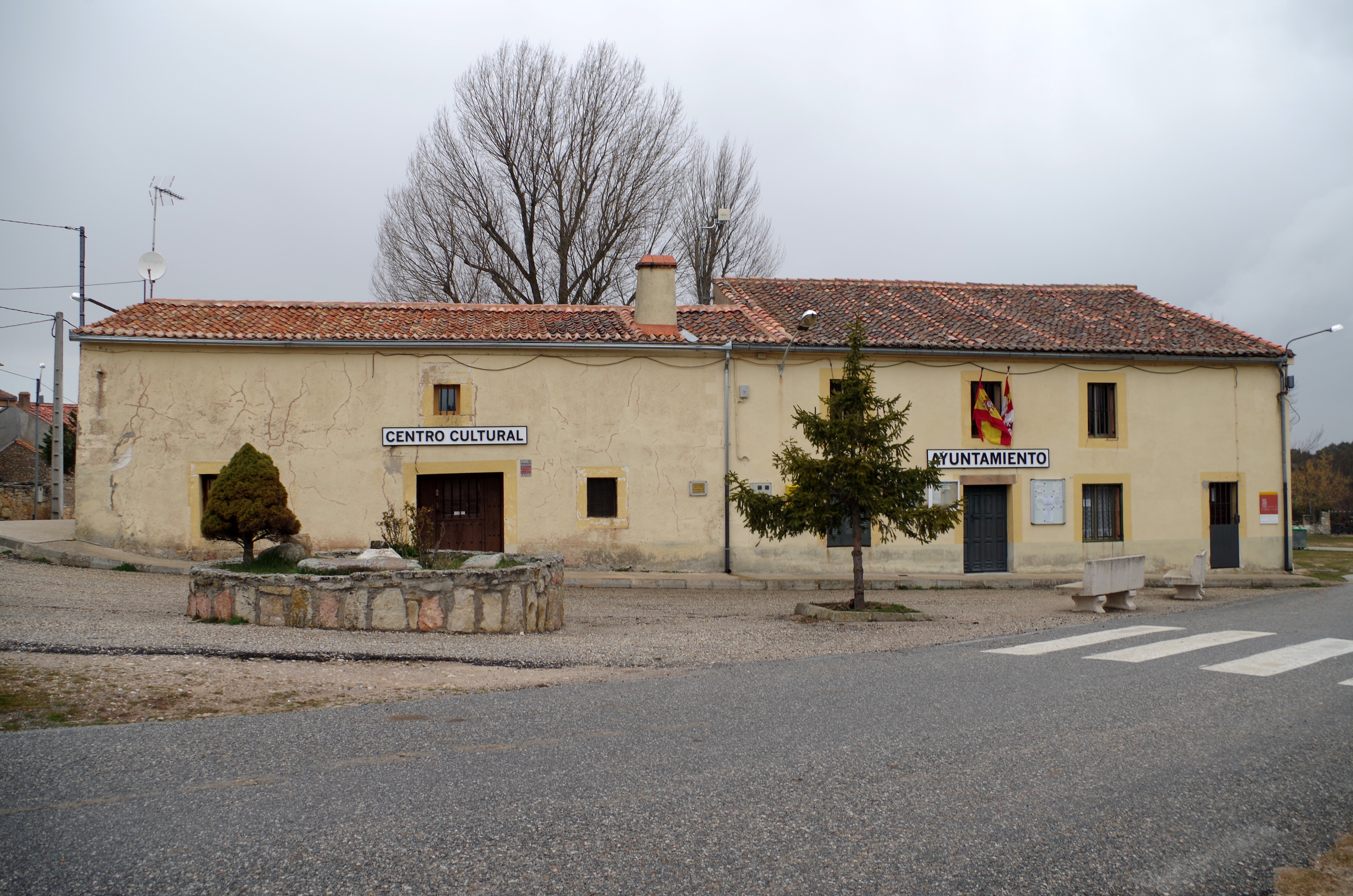

- Flag Coat of arms

- Location in Spain. Ventosilla y Tejadilla (Spain)
- Coordinates: 41°10′55″N 3°41′39″W
- Country: Spain
- Autonomous community: Castile and León
- Province: Segovia
- Municipality: Ventosilla y Tejadilla

Area
  - Total: 5.98 km^{2} (2.31 sq mi)

Population (2025-01-01)
  - Total: 17
  - Density: 2.8/km^{2} (7.4/sq mi)
- Time zone: UTC+1 (CET)
  - Summer (DST): UTC+2 (CEST)
- Website: Official website

Ventosilla y Tejadilla is a municipality located in the province of Segovia, Castile and León, Spain. According to the 2004 census (INE), the municipality had a population of 51 inhabitants.
