= Tolocirio =

- Municipality
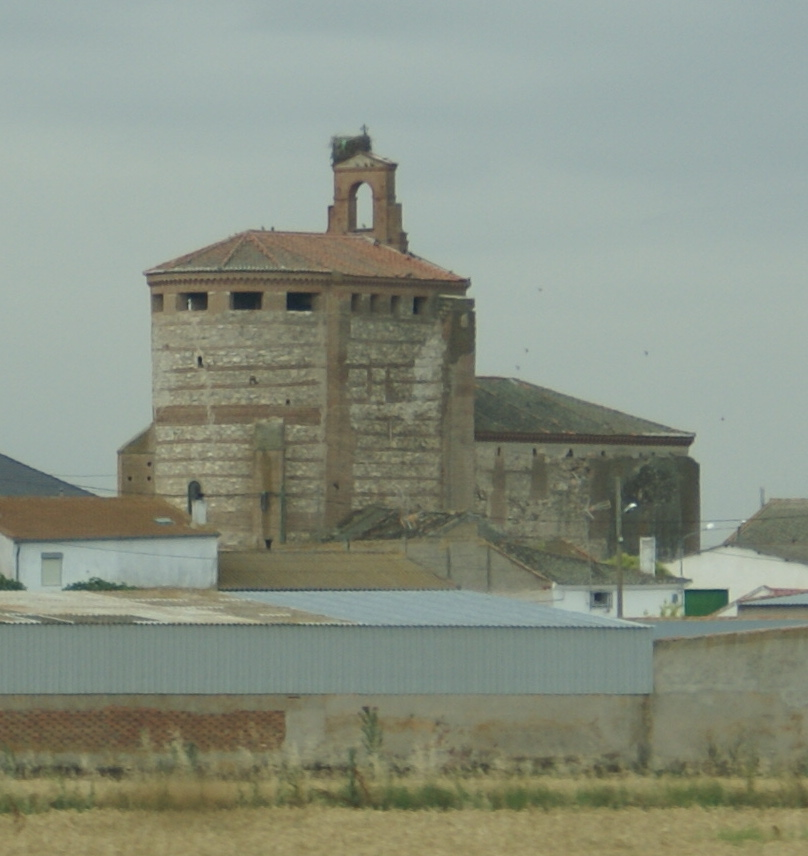
- Iglesia de San Pedro Apóstol, in Tolocirio.

- Location in Spain. Tolocirio (Spain)
- Coordinates: 41°08′02″N 4°39′00″W
- Country: Spain
- Autonomous community: Castile and León
- Province: Segovia
- Municipality: Tolocirio

Area
  - Total: 9 km^{2} (3.5 sq mi)

Population (2025-01-01)
  - Total: 38
  - Density: 4.2/km^{2} (11/sq mi)
- Time zone: UTC+1 (CET)
  - Summer (DST): UTC+2 (CEST)
- Website: Official website

Tolocirio is a municipality located in the province of Segovia, Castile and León, Spain. According to the 2004 census (INE), the municipality has a population of 58 inhabitants.
