= Aldeanueva del Codonal =

- Municipality
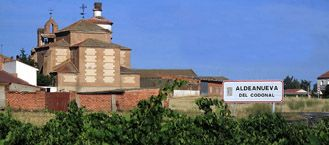

- Location in Spain. Aldeanueva del Codonal (Spain)
- Coordinates: 41°05′00″N 4°32′36″W
- Country: Spain
- Autonomous community: Castile and León
- Municipality: Aldeanueva del Codonal

Area
  - Total: 22.09 km^{2} (8.53 sq mi)
- Elevation: 858 m (2,815 ft)

Population (2025-01-01)
  - Total: 105
  - Density: 4.75/km^{2} (12.3/sq mi)
- Time zone: UTC+1 (CET)
  - Summer (DST): UTC+2 (CEST)
- Website: Official website

Aldeanueva del Codonal is a municipality located in the province of Segovia, Castile and León, Spain. According to the 2004 census (INE), the municipality had a population of 194 inhabitants.

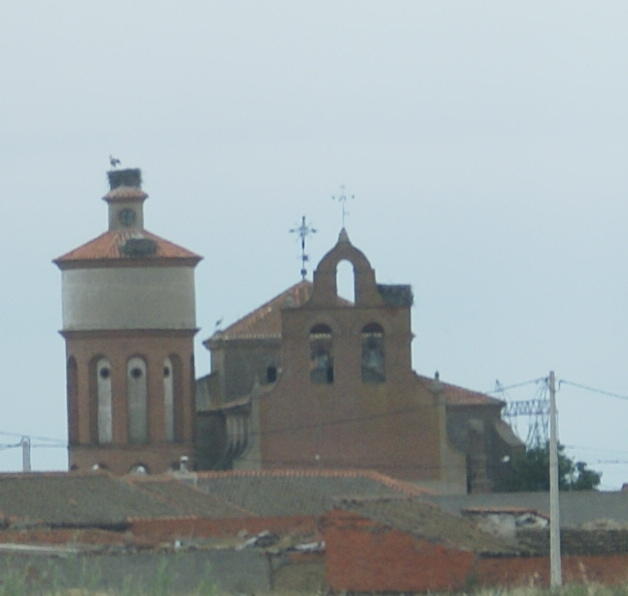
View of the Church of Aldeanueva del Codonal.
