= Zarzuela del Monte =

- Municipality
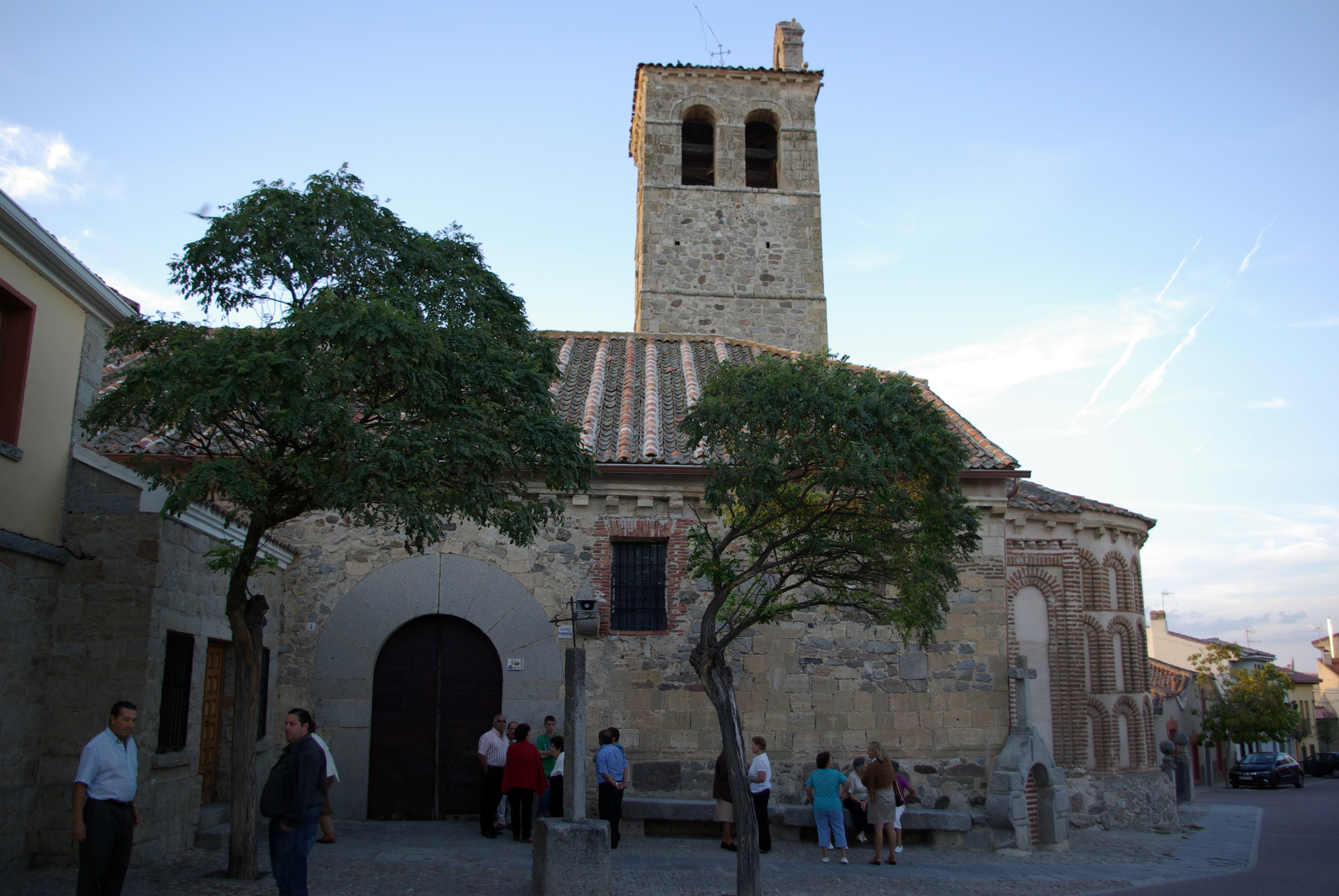
- Church of San Vicente in Zarzuela del Monte (Segovia, Spain).

- Flag Coat of arms

- Location in Spain. Zarzuela del Monte (Spain)
- Coordinates: 40°48′31″N 4°20′11″W
- Country: Spain
- Autonomous community: Castile and León
- Province: Segovia
- Municipality: Zarzuela del Monte

Area
  - Total: 28.38 km^{2} (10.96 sq mi)
- Elevation: 1,005 m (3,297 ft)

Population (2025-01-01)
  - Total: 507
  - Density: 17.9/km^{2} (46.3/sq mi)
- Time zone: UTC+1 (CET)
  - Summer (DST): UTC+2 (CEST)
- Website: Official website

Zarzuela del Monte is a municipality located in the province of Segovia, Castile and León, Spain. According to the 2004 census (INE), the municipality had a population of 524 inhabitants.
