= Urueñas =

- Municipality
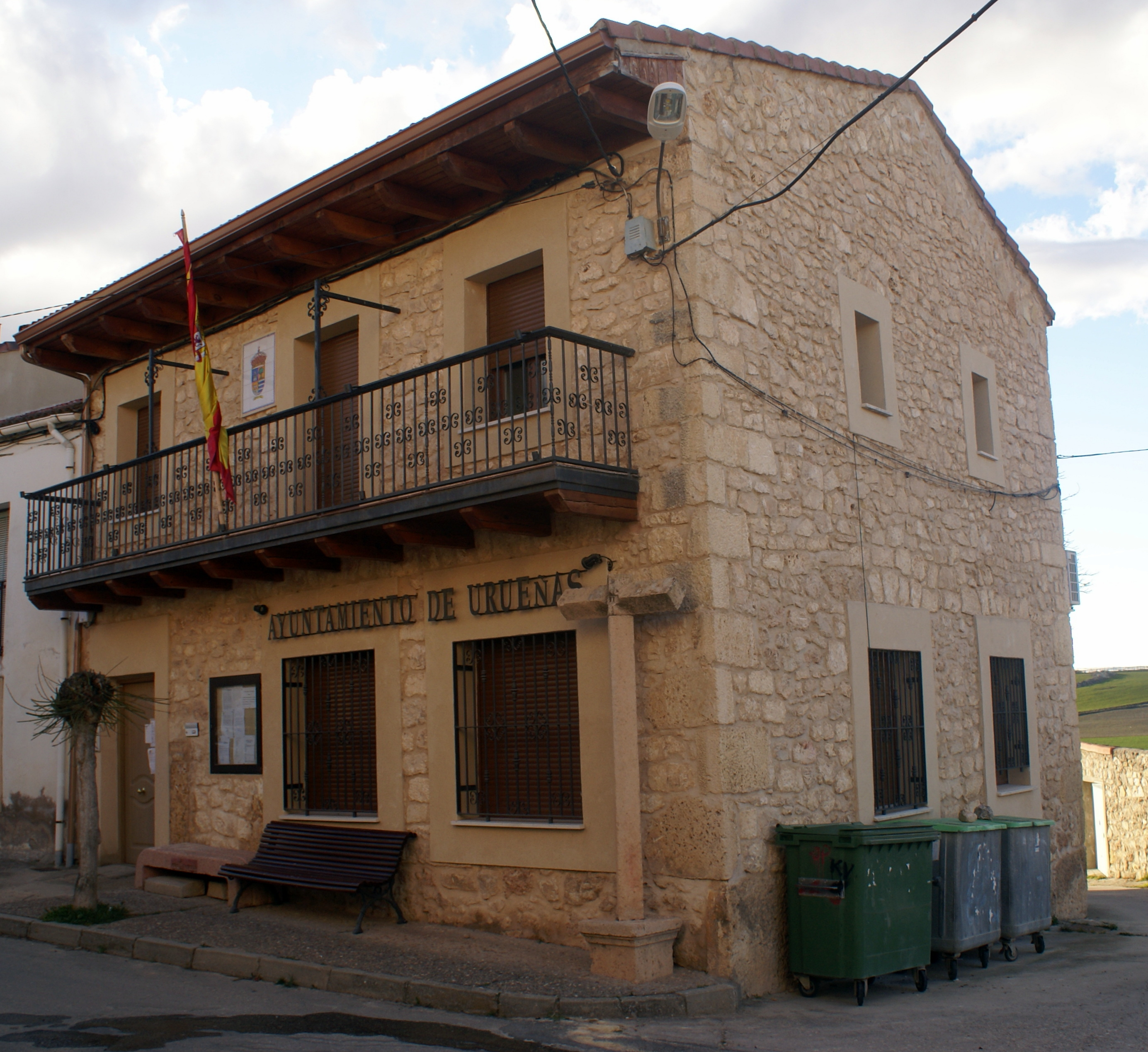
- Town hall of Urueñas

- Flag Coat of arms

- Location in Spain. Urueñas (Spain)
- Coordinates: 41°21′21″N 3°46′30″W
- Country: Spain
- Autonomous community: Castile and León
- Province: Segovia
- Municipality: Urueñas

Area
  - Total: 33 km^{2} (13 sq mi)

Population (2025-01-01)
  - Total: 105
  - Density: 3.2/km^{2} (8.2/sq mi)
- Time zone: UTC+1 (CET)
  - Summer (DST): UTC+2 (CEST)
- Website: Official website

Urueñas is a municipality located in the province of Segovia, Castile and León, Spain. According to the 2004 census (INE), the municipality has a population of 118 inhabitants.
