= Donhierro =

- Municipality
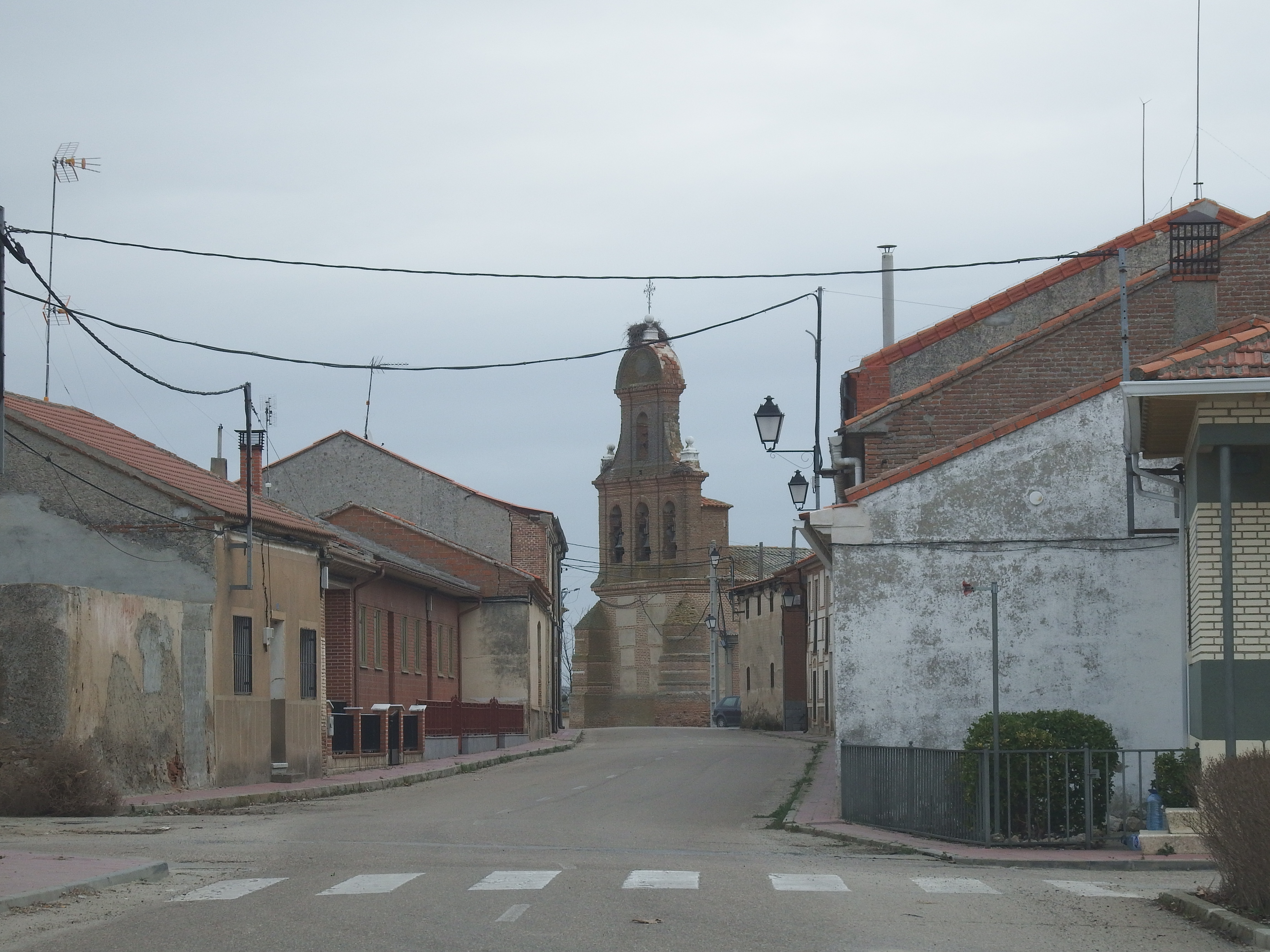

- Location in Spain. Donhierro (Spain)
- Coordinates: 41°06′58″N 4°41′46″W
- Country: Spain
- Autonomous community: Castile and León
- Province: Segovia
- Municipality: Donhierro

Area
  - Total: 17 km^{2} (6.6 sq mi)

Population (2025-01-01)
  - Total: 73
  - Density: 4.3/km^{2} (11/sq mi)
- Time zone: UTC+1 (CET)
  - Summer (DST): UTC+2 (CEST)
- Website: Official website

Donhierro is a municipality located in the province of Segovia, Castile and León, Spain. According to the 2004 census (INE), the municipality has a population of 96 inhabitants.
