= Santa Marta del Cerro =

- Municipality
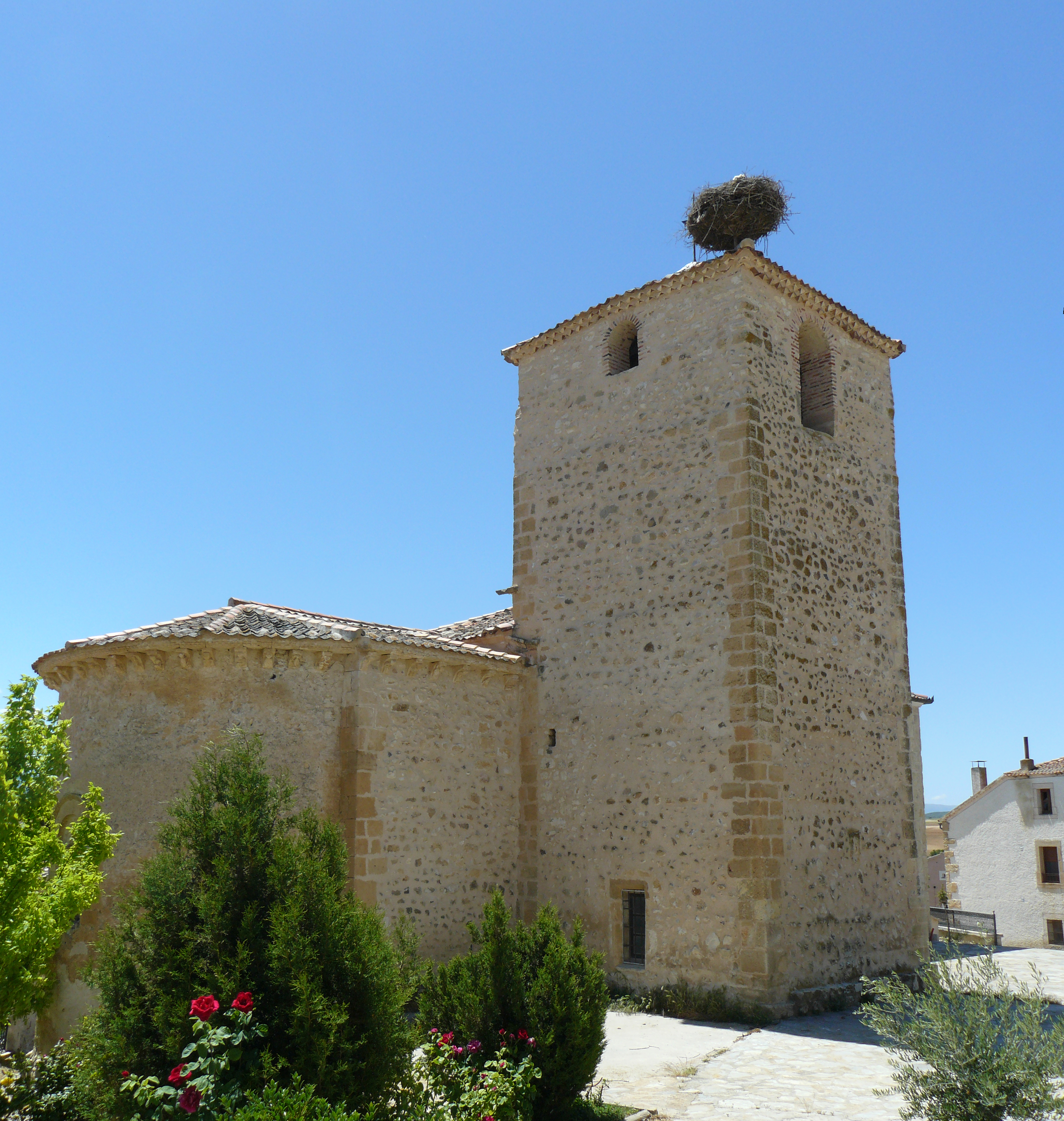
- Romanesque church of Santa Marta del Cerro, Segovia.

- Location in Spain. Santa Marta del Cerro (Spain)
- Coordinates: 41°13′06″N 3°41′06″W
- Country: Spain
- Autonomous community: Castile and León
- Province: Segovia
- Municipality: Santa Marta del Cerro

Area
  - Total: 14 km^{2} (5.4 sq mi)

Population (2025-01-01)
  - Total: 45
  - Density: 3.2/km^{2} (8.3/sq mi)
- Time zone: UTC+1 (CET)
  - Summer (DST): UTC+2 (CEST)
- Website: Official website

Santa Marta del Cerro is a municipality located in the province of Segovia, Castile and León, Spain. According to the 2004 census (INE), the municipality has a population of 53 inhabitants.
