= Languilla =

- Municipality
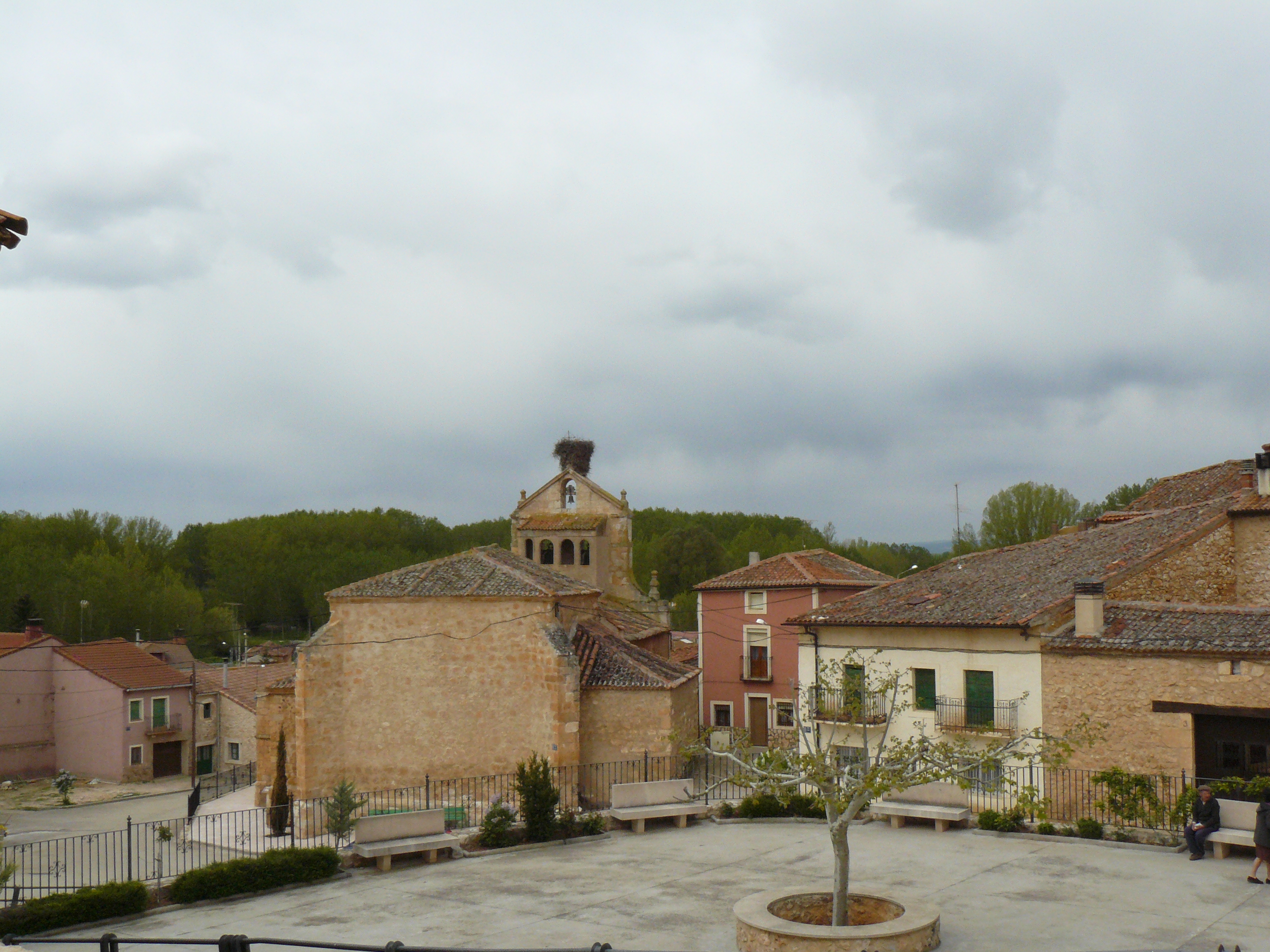
- A picture of Plaza de Languilla, Segovia.

- Location in Spain. Languilla (Spain)
- Coordinates: 41°27′00″N 3°25′30″W
- Country: Spain
- Autonomous community: Castile and León
- Province: Segovia
- Municipality: Languilla

Area
  - Total: 26 km^{2} (10 sq mi)

Population (2025-01-01)
  - Total: 79
  - Density: 3.0/km^{2} (7.9/sq mi)
- Time zone: UTC+1 (CET)
  - Summer (DST): UTC+2 (CEST)
- Website: Official website

Languilla is a municipality located in the province of Segovia, Castile and León, Spain. According to the 2004 census (INE), the municipality has a population of 119 inhabitants.
