= Aldehorno =

- Municipality
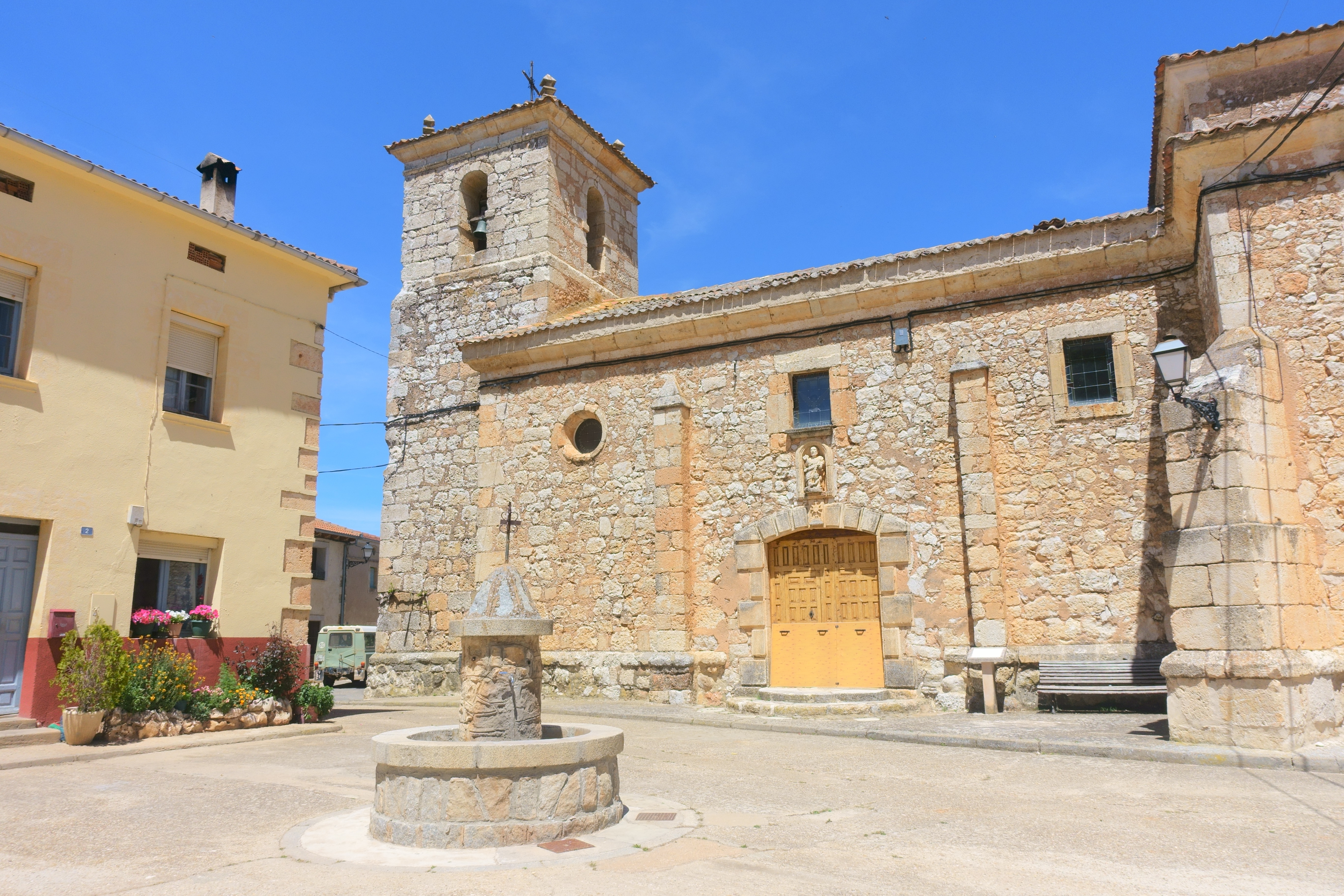
- Church of San Pedro, Aldehorno

- Location in Spain. Aldehorno (Spain)
- Coordinates: 41°30′46″N 3°46′41″W
- Country: Spain
- Autonomous community: Castile and León
- Province: Segovia
- Municipality: Aldehorno

Area
  - Total: 13.51 km^{2} (5.22 sq mi)
- Elevation: 956 m (3,136 ft)

Population (2025-01-01)
  - Total: 64
  - Density: 4.7/km^{2} (12/sq mi)
- Time zone: UTC+1 (CET)
  - Summer (DST): UTC+2 (CEST)
- Website: Official website

Aldehorno is a municipality located in the province of Segovia, Castile and León, Spain. According to the 2004 census (INE), the municipality had a population of 62 inhabitants.
