= Arevalillo de Cega =

- Municipality
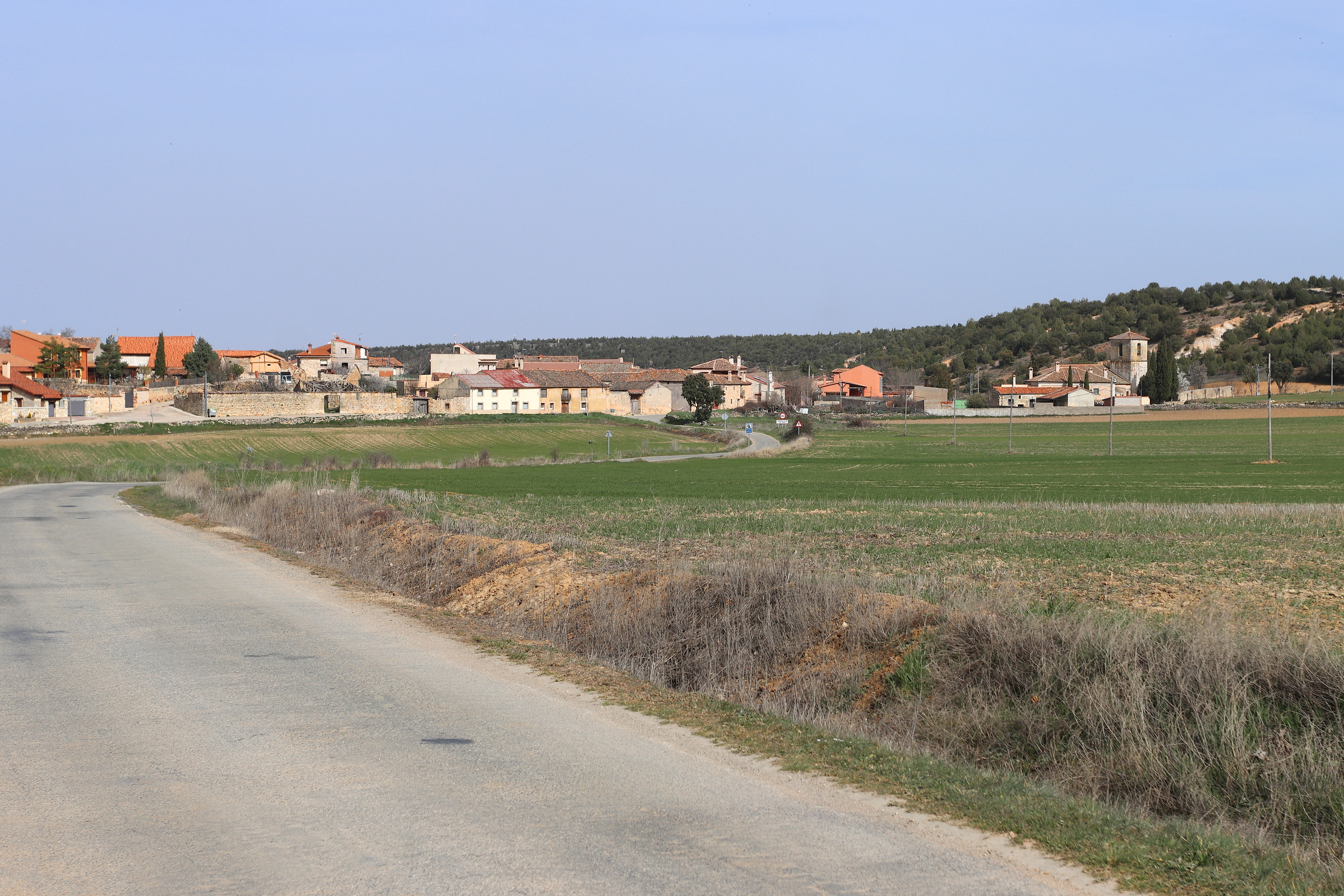
- Arevalillo de Cega - View of the town

- Location in Spain. Arevalillo de Cega (Spain)
- Coordinates: 41°09′41″N 3°53′19″W
- Country: Spain
- Autonomous community: Castile and León
- Province: Segovia
- Municipality: Arevalillo de Cega

Area
  - Total: 11.59 km^{2} (4.47 sq mi)
- Elevation: 1,047 m (3,435 ft)

Population (2025-01-01)
  - Total: 18
  - Density: 1.6/km^{2} (4.0/sq mi)
- Time zone: UTC+1 (CET)
  - Summer (DST): UTC+2 (CEST)
- Website: Official website

Arevalillo de Cega is a municipality located in the province of Segovia, Castile and León, Spain. According to the 2004 census (INE), the municipality had a population of 42 inhabitants.
