= Membibre de la Hoz =

- Municipality
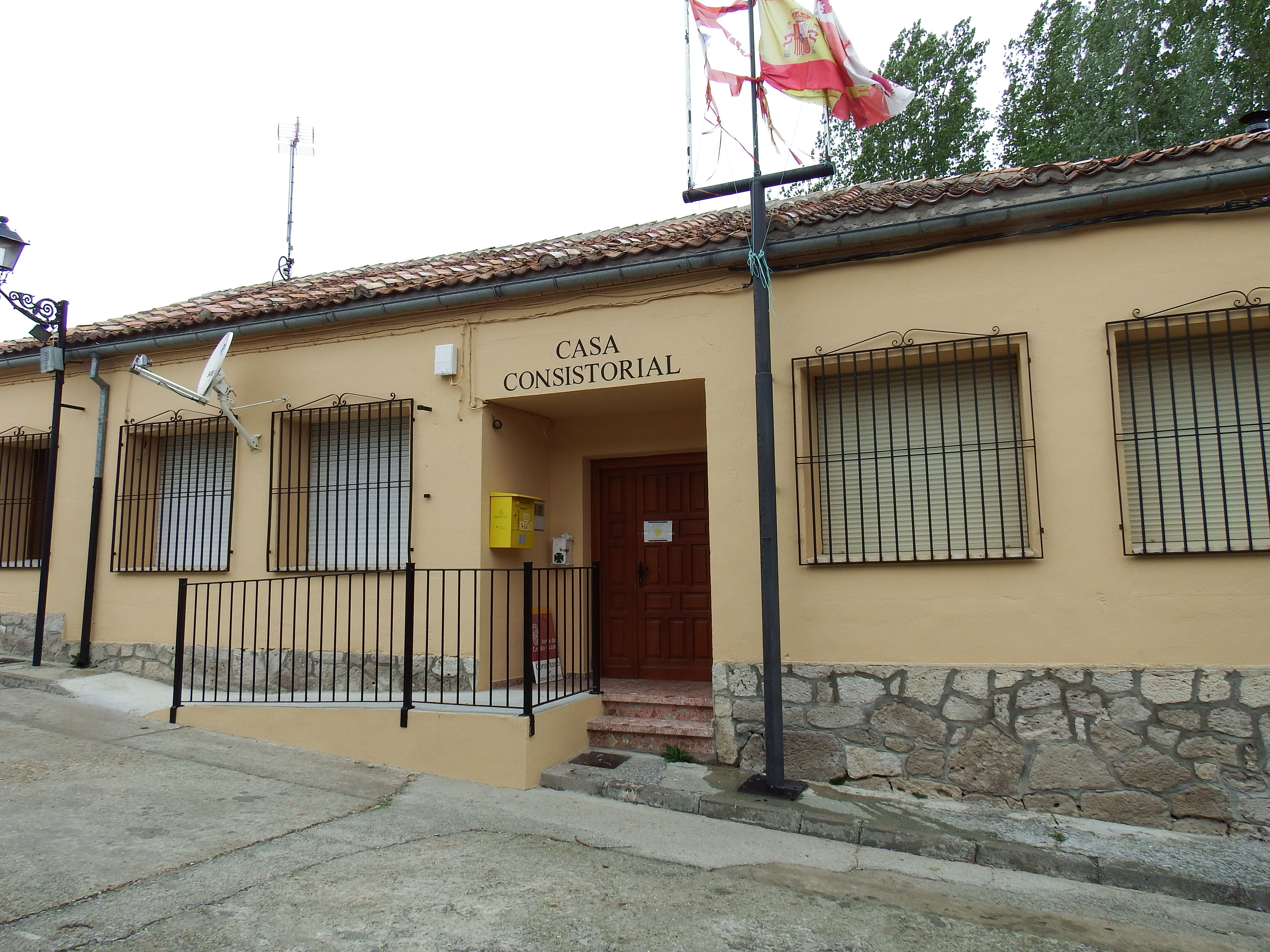
- Town hall

- Location in Spain. Membibre de la Hoz (Spain)
- Coordinates: 41°26′59″N 4°05′42″W
- Country: Spain
- Autonomous community: Castile and León
- Province: Segovia
- Municipality: Membibre de la Hoz

Area
  - Total: 15 km^{2} (5.8 sq mi)

Population (2025-01-01)
  - Total: 42
  - Density: 2.8/km^{2} (7.3/sq mi)
- Time zone: UTC+1 (CET)
  - Summer (DST): UTC+2 (CEST)
- Website: Official website

Membibre de la Hoz is a municipality located in the province of Segovia, Castile and León, Spain. According to the 2004 census (INE), the municipality has a population of 60 inhabitants.
