= Marazoleja =

- Municipality
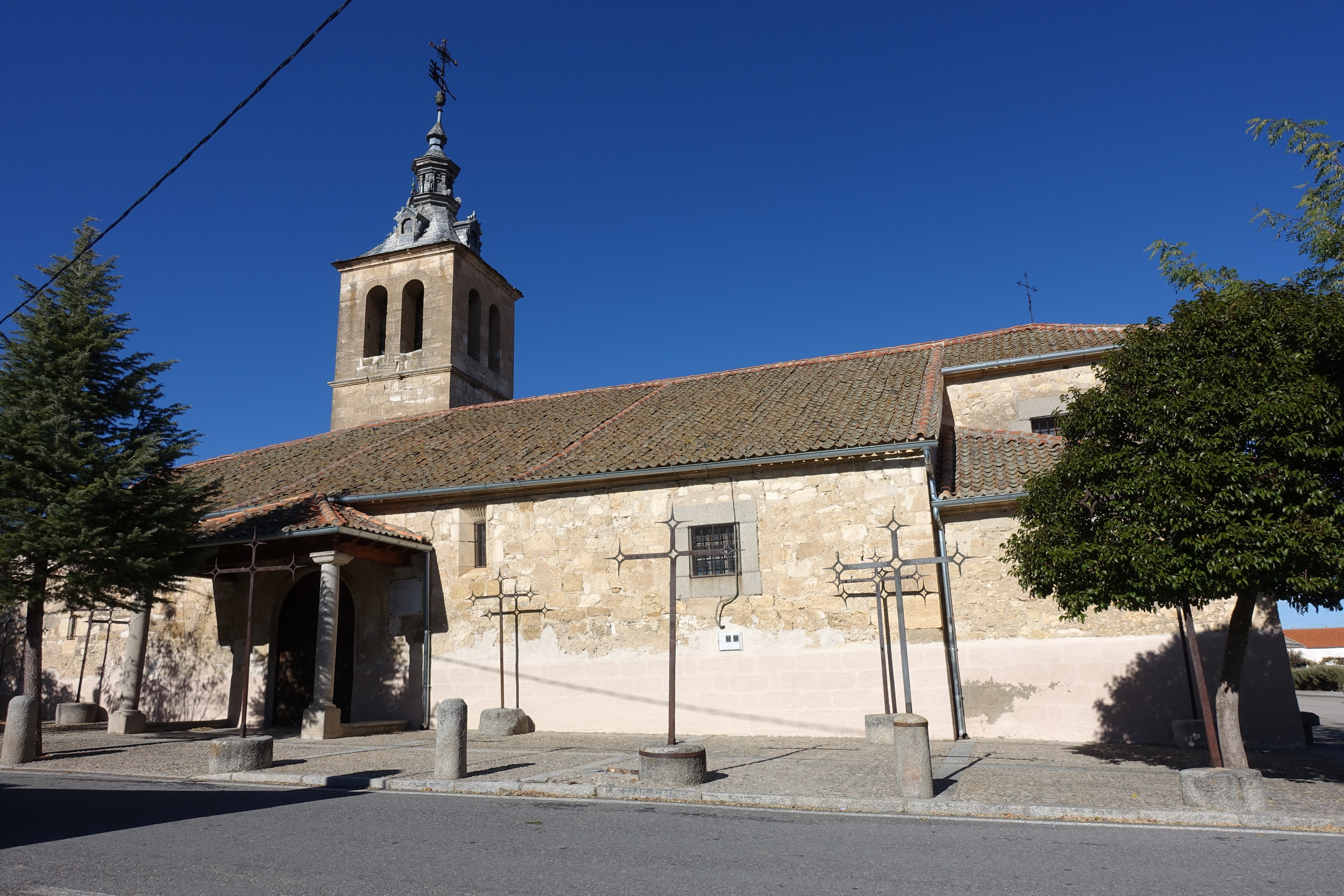
- Church of San Juan Evangelista, Marazoleja

- Flag Coat of arms

- Location in Spain. Marazoleja (Spain)
- Coordinates: 40°57′39″N 4°20′19″W
- Country: Spain
- Autonomous community: Castile and León
- Province: Segovia
- Municipality: Marazoleja

Area
  - Total: 26 km^{2} (10 sq mi)

Population (2025-01-01)
  - Total: 98
  - Density: 3.8/km^{2} (9.8/sq mi)
- Time zone: UTC+1 (CET)
  - Summer (DST): UTC+2 (CEST)
- Website: Official website

Marazoleja is a municipality located in the province of Segovia, Castile and León, Spain. According to the 2004 census (INE), the municipality has a population of 132 inhabitants.

== Climate ==
The climate is temperate . The average temperature is 13 °C . The hottest month is July, at 26 °C, and the coldest is December, at 2 °C. The average rainfall is 767 millimetres per year. The wettest month is November, with 104 millimetres of rainfall, and the driest is August, with 8 millimetres.
