= Martín Miguel =

- Municipality
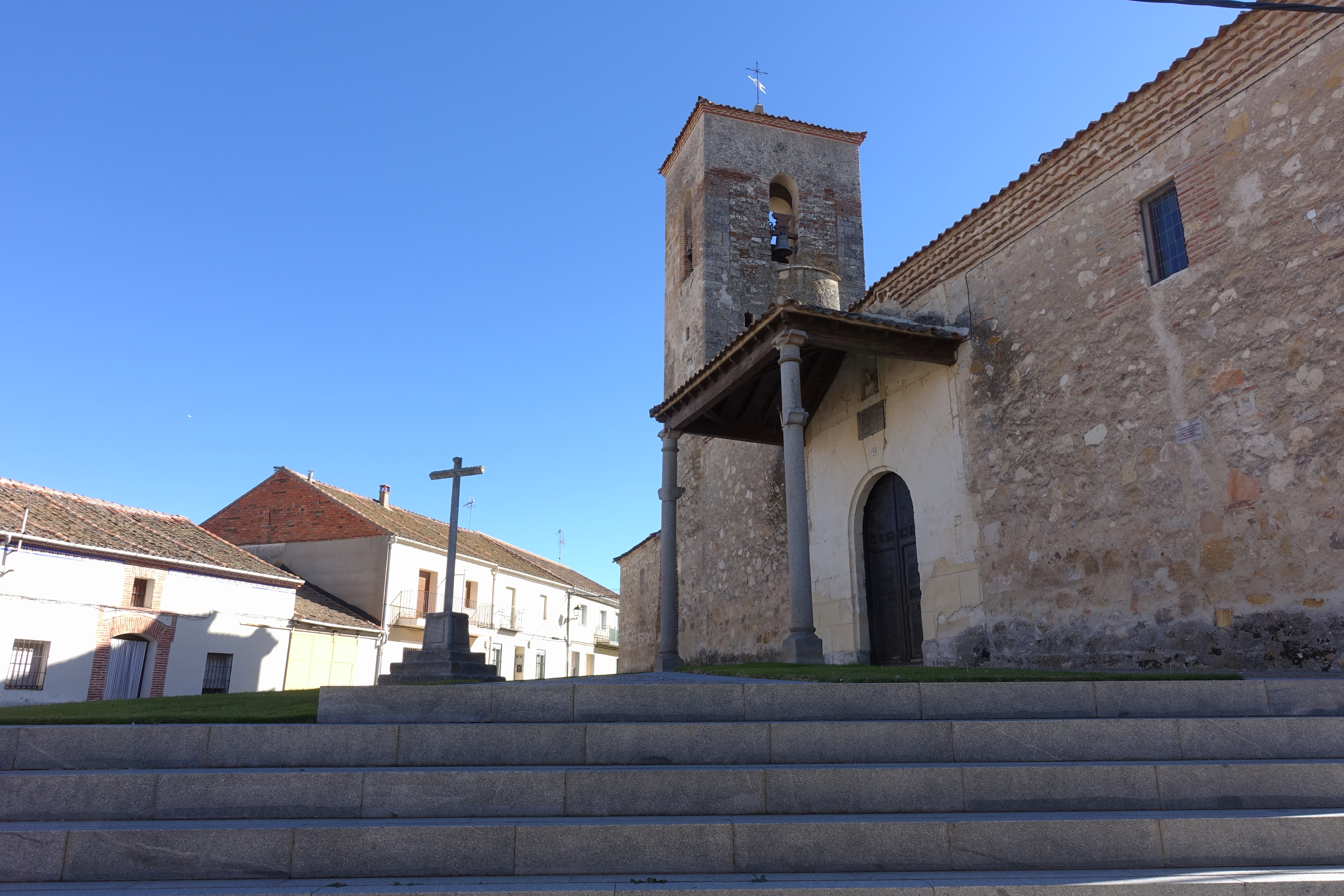
- Church of San Bartolomé, in Martín Miguel (Segovia, Spain).

- Location in Spain. Martín Miguel (Spain)
- Coordinates: 40°57′04″N 4°16′23″W
- Country: Spain
- Autonomous community: Castile and León
- Province: Segovia
- Municipality: Martín Miguel

Area
  - Total: 15 km^{2} (5.8 sq mi)

Population (2025-01-01)
  - Total: 276
  - Density: 18/km^{2} (48/sq mi)
- Time zone: UTC+1 (CET)
  - Summer (DST): UTC+2 (CEST)
- Website: Official website

Martín Miguel is a municipality located in the province of Segovia, Castile and León, Spain. According to the 2004 census (INE), the municipality has a population of 183 inhabitants.
