= Torre Val de San Pedro =

- Municipality
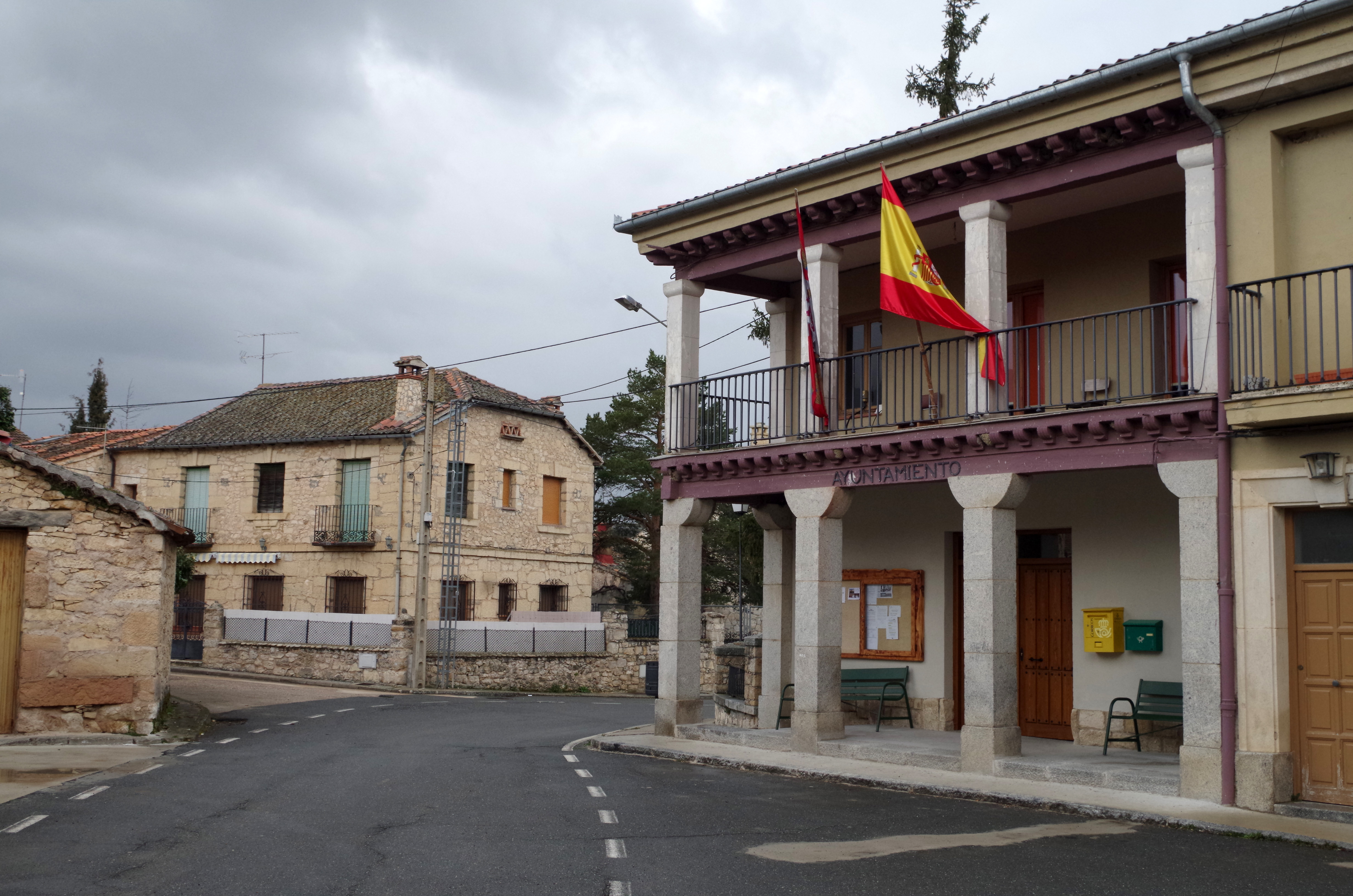
- Torre Val de San Pedro Town Hall

- Flag Coat of arms

- Location in Spain. Torre Val de San Pedro (Spain)
- Coordinates: 41°04′26″N 3°52′16″W
- Country: Spain
- Autonomous community: Castile and León
- Province: Segovia
- Municipality: Torre Val de San Pedro

Area
  - Total: 44.22 km^{2} (17.07 sq mi)
- Elevation: 1,119 m (3,671 ft)

Population (2025-01-01)
  - Total: 165
  - Density: 3.73/km^{2} (9.66/sq mi)
- Time zone: UTC+1 (CET)
  - Summer (DST): UTC+2 (CEST)
- Website: Official website

Torre Val de San Pedro is a municipality located in the province of Segovia, Castile and León, Spain. According to the 2004 census (INE), the municipality had a population of 191 inhabitants.
