= Pinarnegrillo =

- Municipality
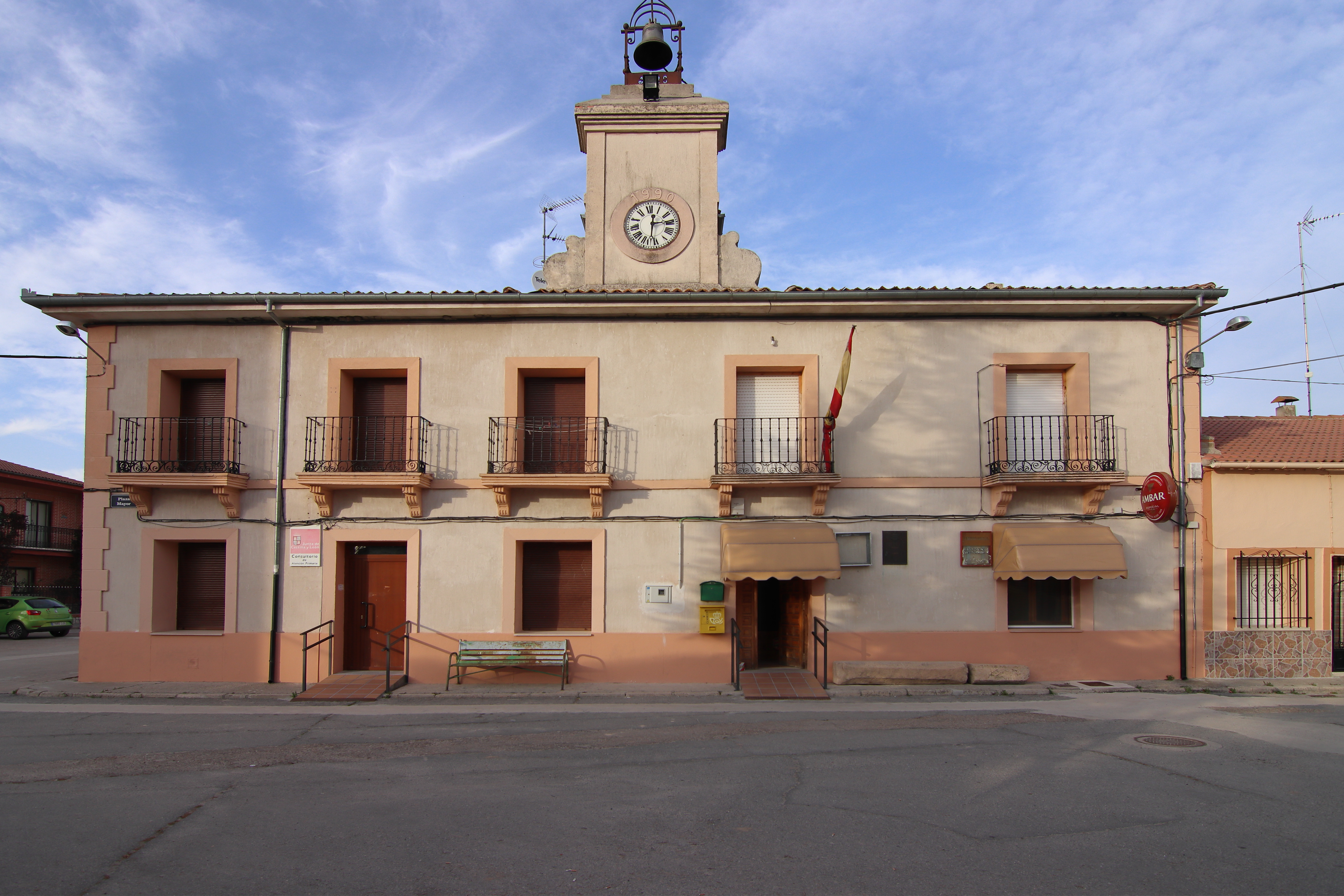
- Pinarnegrillo City Council

- Location in Spain. Pinarnegrillo (Spain)
- Coordinates: 41°11′25″N 4°12′25″W
- Country: Spain
- Autonomous community: Castile and León
- Province: Segovia
- Municipality: Pinarnegrillo

Area
  - Total: 19 km^{2} (7.3 sq mi)
- Elevation: 856 m (2,808 ft)

Population (2025-01-01)
  - Total: 98
  - Density: 5.2/km^{2} (13/sq mi)
- Time zone: UTC+1 (CET)
  - Summer (DST): UTC+2 (CEST)
- Website: Official website

Pinarnegrillo is a municipality located in the province of Segovia, Castile and León, Spain. According to the 2004 census (INE), the municipality had a population of 162 inhabitants. In 2018 it had fallen to 100.

The village is famous for its tomato plantation.
