= Torrecilla del Pinar =

- Municipality
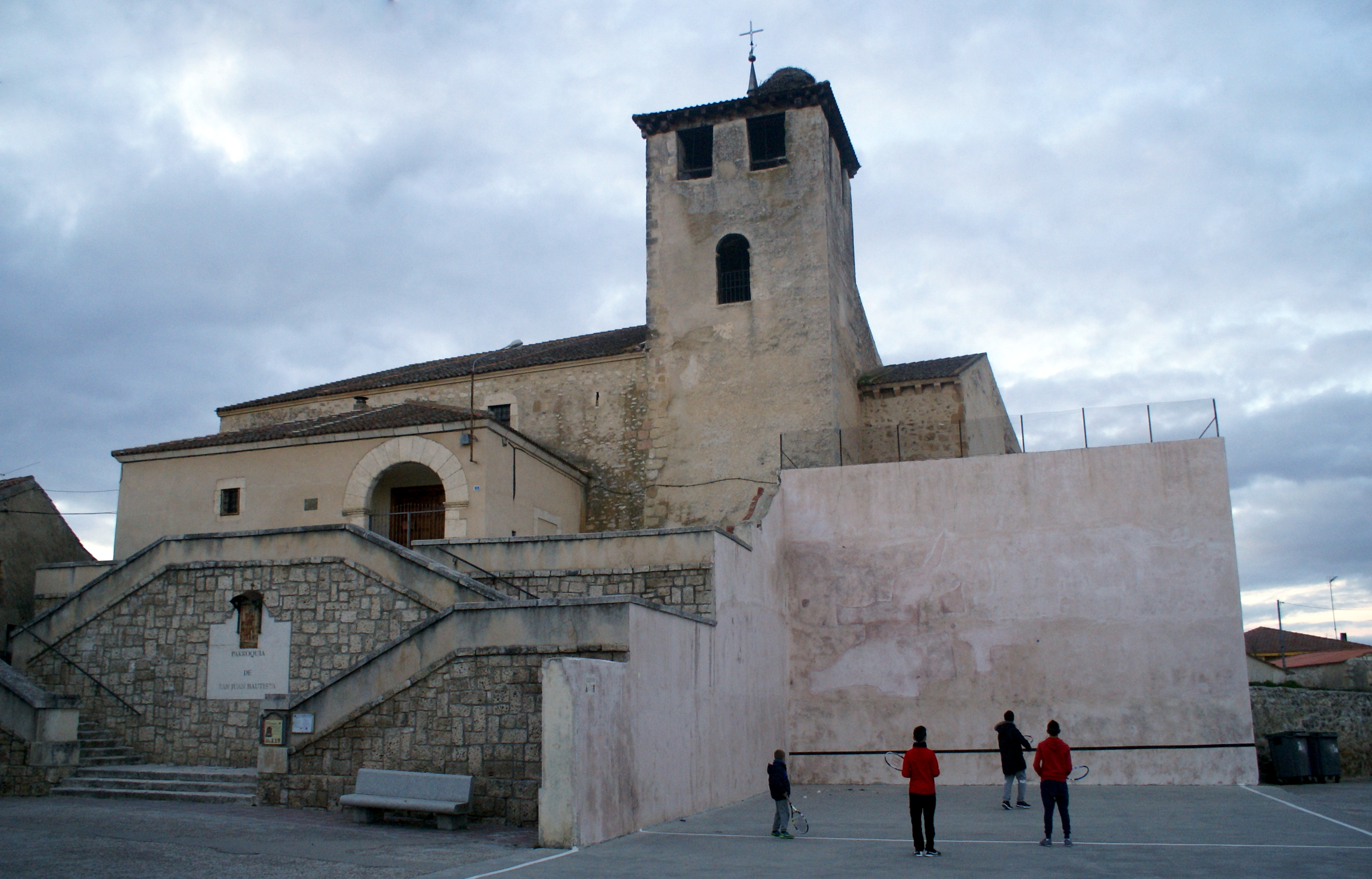

- Location in Spain. Torrecilla del Pinar (Spain)
- Coordinates: 41°22′27″N 4°02′16″W
- Country: Spain
- Autonomous community: Castile and León
- Province: Segovia
- Municipality: Torrecilla del Pinar

Area
  - Total: 19 km^{2} (7.3 sq mi)

Population (2025-01-01)
  - Total: 188
  - Density: 9.9/km^{2} (26/sq mi)
- Time zone: UTC+1 (CET)
  - Summer (DST): UTC+2 (CEST)
- Website: Official website

Torrecilla del Pinar is a municipality located in the province of Segovia, Castile and León, Spain. According to the 2004 census (INE), the municipality has a population of 284 inhabitants.
