= Aldeanueva de la Serrezuela =

- Municipality
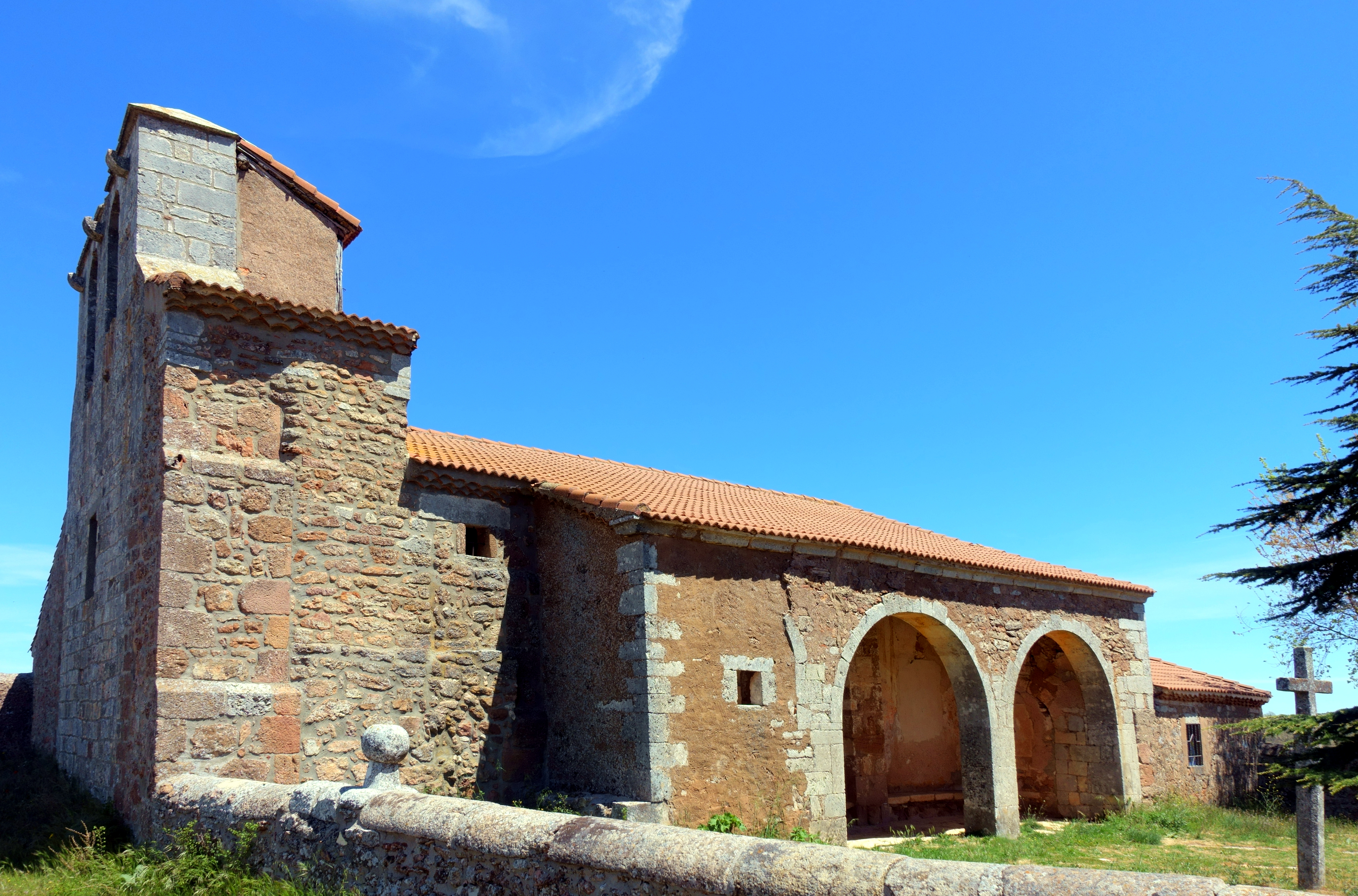

- Flag Coat of arms

- Aldeanueva de la Serrezuela within Segovia

- Location in Spain. Aldeanueva de la Serrezuela (Spain)
- Coordinates: 41°27′37″N 3°46′52″W
- Country: Spain
- Autonomous community: Castile and León
- Province: Segovia
- Municipality: Aldeanueva de la Serrezuela

Area
  - Total: 20.39 km^{2} (7.87 sq mi)
- Elevation: 1,131 m (3,711 ft)

Population (2025-01-01)
  - Total: 42
  - Density: 2.1/km^{2} (5.3/sq mi)
- Time zone: UTC+1 (CET)
  - Summer (DST): UTC+2 (CEST)
- Website: Official website

Aldeanueva de la Serrezuela is a municipality located in the province of Segovia in Castile and León, Spain. According to the 2004 census (INE), the municipality had a population of 54 inhabitants.
