= Castro de Fuentidueña =

- Municipality
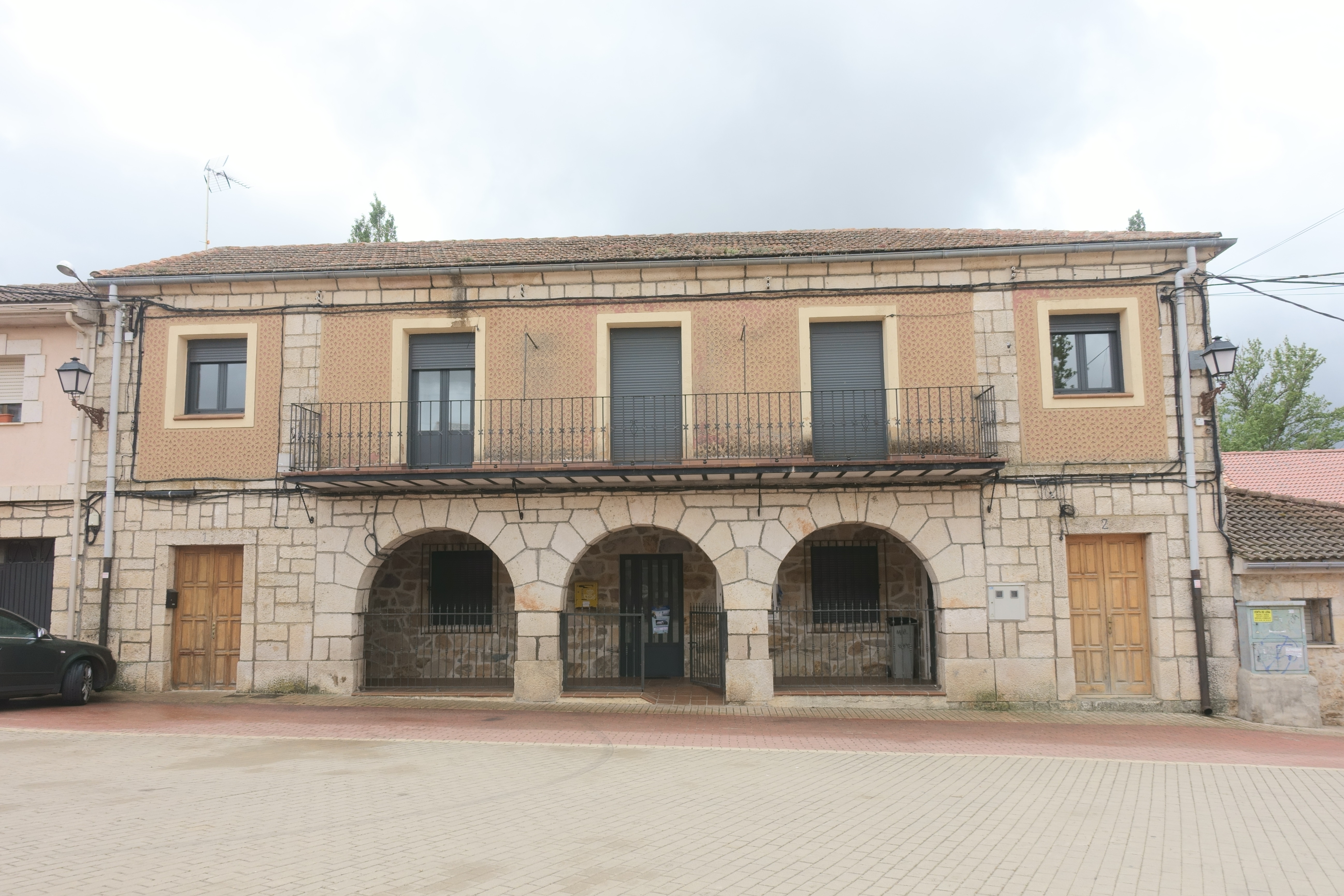
- Town Hall of Castro de Fuentidueña (Segovia, Spain).

- Location in Spain. Castro de Fuentidueña (Spain)
- Coordinates: 41°25′13″N 3°51′16″W
- Country: Spain
- Autonomous community: Castile and León
- Province: Segovia
- Municipality: Castro de Fuentidueña

Area
  - Total: 19 km^{2} (7.3 sq mi)

Population (2025-01-01)
  - Total: 41
  - Density: 2.2/km^{2} (5.6/sq mi)
- Time zone: UTC+1 (CET)
  - Summer (DST): UTC+2 (CEST)
- Website: Official website

Castro de Fuentidueña is a municipality located in the province of Segovia, Castile and León, Spain. According to the 2004 census (INE), the municipality has a population of 73 inhabitants.
