= List of municipalities in Segovia =

Map of Spain with the province of Segovia highlighted

This is a list of the municipalities in the province of Segovia in the autonomous community of Castile-Leon, Spain.

Name	Population (2024)
Abades	859
Adrada de Pirón	40
Adrados	123
Aguilafuente	564
Alconada de Maderuelo	26
Aldea Real	287
Aldealcorvo	18
Aldealengua de Pedraza	79
Aldealengua de Santa María	59
Aldeanueva de la Serrezuela	42
Aldeanueva del Codonal	108
Aldeasoña	67
Aldehorno	59
Aldehuela del Codonal	24
Aldeonte	55
Anaya	119
Añe	66
Arahuetes	31
Arcones	180
Arevalillo de Cega	18
Armuña	241
Ayllón	1,105
Barbolla	150
Basardilla	136
Bercial	105
Bercimuel	36
Bernardos	463
Bernuy de Porreros	1,247
Boceguillas	721
Brieva	86
Caballar	75
Cabañas de Polendos	199
Cabezuela	656
Calabazas de Fuentidueña	25
Campo de San Pedro	259
Cantalejo	3,558
Cantimpalos	1,427
Carabias	54
Carbonero el Mayor	2,502
Carrascal del Río	136
Casla	155
Castillejo de Mesleón	110
Castro de Fuentidueña	48
Castrojimeno	31
Castroserna de Abajo	32
Castroserracín	24
Cedillo de la Torre	81
Cerezo de Abajo	145
Cerezo de Arriba	134
Cilleruelo de San Mamés	35
Cobos de Fuentidueña	28
Coca	1,703
Codorniz	307
Collado Hermoso	118
Condado de Castilnovo	79
Corral de Ayllón	77
Cozuelos de Fuentidueña	105
Cubillo	73
Cuéllar	9,530
Cuevas de Provanco	132
Chañe	741
Domingo García	32
Donhierro	75
Duruelo	171
Encinas	40
Encinillas	352
Escalona del Prado	468
Escarabajosa de Cabezas	276
Escobar de Polendos	166
El Espinar	10,145
Espirdo	1,607
Fresneda de Cuéllar	170
Fresno de Cantespino	288
Fresno de la Fuente	77
Frumales	120
Fuente de Santa Cruz	99
Fuente el Olmo de Fuentidueña	395
Fuente el Olmo de Íscar	45
Fuentepelayo	772
Fuentepiñel	68
Fuenterrebollo	339
Fuentesaúco de Fuentidueña	223
Fuentesoto	100
Fuentidueña	133
Gallegos	93
Garcillán	515
Gomezserracín	625
Grajera	256
Honrubia de la Cuesta	49
Hontalbilla	299
Hontanares de Eresma	1,662
Los Huertos	170
Ituero y Lama	488
Juarros de Riomoros	45
Juarros de Voltoya	184
Labajos	106
Laguna de Contreras	115
Languilla	84
Lastras de Cuéllar	307
Lastras del Pozo	64
La Lastrilla	4,697
La Losa	531
Maderuelo	101
Marazoleja	96
Marazuela	53
Martín Miguel	224
Martín Muñoz de la Dehesa	307
Martín Muñoz de las Posadas	249
Marugán	763
Mata de Cuéllar	263
Matabuena	207
La Matilla	71
Melque de Cercos	65
Membibre de la Hoz	43
Migueláñez	138
Montejo de Arévalo	161
Montejo de la Vega de la Serrezuela	124
Monterrubio	56
Moral de Hornuez	40
Mozoncillo	907
Muñopedro	309
Muñoveros	145
Nava de la Asunción	2,787
Navafría	279
Navalilla	97
Navalmanzano	1,044
Navares de Ayuso	53
Navares de Enmedio	92
Navares de las Cuevas	25
Navas de Oro	1,274
Navas de Riofrío	439
Navas de San Antonio	366
Nieva	256
Olombrada	503
Orejana	62
Ortigosa de Pestaño	53
Ortigosa del Monte	587
Otero de Herreros	966
Pajarejos	24
Palazuelos de Eresma	5,968
Pedraza	349
Pelayos del Arroyo	48
Perosillo	20
Pinarejos	194
Pinarnegrillo	96
Prádena	468
Puebla de Pedraza	51
Rapariegos	194
Rebollo	74
Remondo	316
Riaguas de San Bartolomé	27
Riaza	2,144
Ribota	43
Riofrío de Riaza	27
Roda de Eresma	253
Sacramenia	330
Samboal	461
San Cristóbal de Cuéllar	154
San Cristóbal de la Vega	83
San Cristóbal de Segovia	3,153
Real Sitio de San Ildefonso	5,205
San Martín y Mudrián	251
San Miguel de Bernuy	134
San Pedro de Gaíllos	311
Sanchonuño	1,027
Sangarcía	279
Santa María la Real de Nieva	885
Santa Marta del Cerro	49
Santiuste de Pedraza	122
Santiuste de San Juan Bautista	535
Santo Domingo de Pirón	51
Santo Tomé del Puerto	234
Sauquillo de Cabezas	137
Sebúlcor	241
Segovia	51,525
Sepúlveda	988
Sequera de Fresno	47
Sotillo	30
Sotosalbos	135
Tabanera la Luenga	53
Tolocirio	36
Torre Val de San Pedro	180
Torreadrada	50
Torrecaballeros	1,496
Torrecilla del Pinar	179
Torreiglesias	256
Trescasas	1,105
Turégano	1,017
Urueñas	98
Valdeprados	60
Valdevacas de Montejo	29
Valdevacas y Guijar	80
Valseca	218
Valtiendas	77
Valverde del Majano	1,126
Valle de Tabladillo	74
Vallelado	728
Valleruela de Pedraza	65
Valleruela de Sepúlveda	52
Veganzones	197
Vegas de Matute	339
Ventosilla y Tejadilla	17
Villacastín	1,525
Villaverde de Íscar	593
Villaverde de Montejo	21
Villeguillo	120
Yanguas de Eresma	117
Zarzuela del Monte	498
Zarzuela del Pinar	408

== See also ==
- Geography of Spain
- List of cities in Spain
