= Laguna de Contreras =

- Municipality
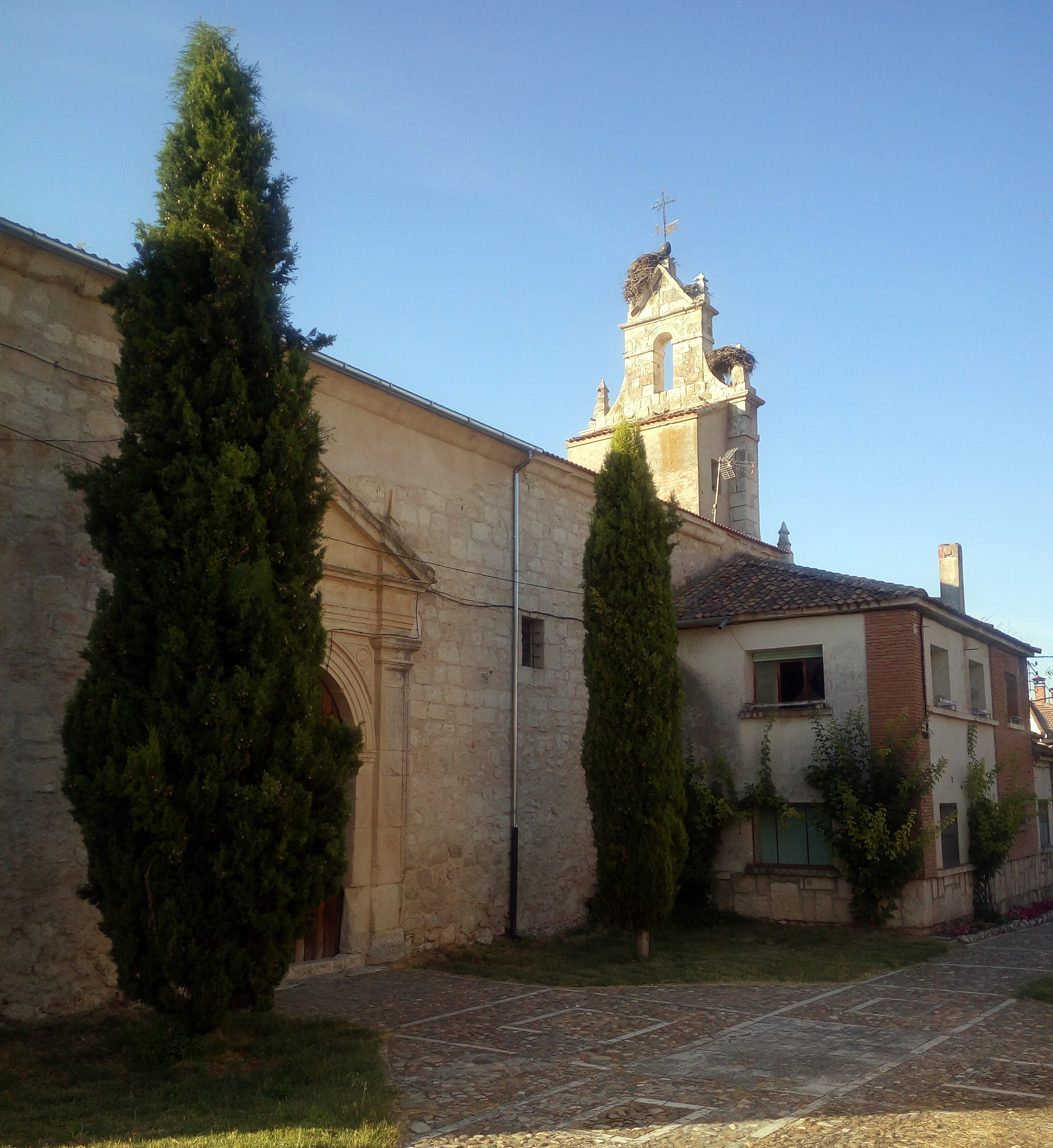
- Church of Our Lady of the Assumption in Laguna de Contreras, Segovia, Spain.

- Location in Spain. Laguna de Contreras (Spain)
- Coordinates: 41°29′40″N 4°01′44″W
- Country: Spain
- Autonomous community: Castile and León
- Province: Segovia
- Municipality: Laguna de Contreras

Area
  - Total: 19 km^{2} (7.3 sq mi)

Population (2025-01-01)
  - Total: 111
  - Density: 5.8/km^{2} (15/sq mi)
- Time zone: UTC+1 (CET)
  - Summer (DST): UTC+2 (CEST)
- Website: Official website

Laguna de Contreras is a municipality located in the province of Segovia, Castile and León, Spain. According to the 2004 census (INE), the municipality has a population of 152 inhabitants.
