= Ribota =

- Municipality
- Location in Spain. Ribota (Spain)
- Coordinates: 41°21′55″N 3°25′44″W
- Country: Spain
- Autonomous community: Castile and León
- Province: Segovia
- Municipality: Ribota

Area
  - Total: 21 km^{2} (8.1 sq mi)

Population (2025-01-01)
  - Total: 40
  - Density: 1.9/km^{2} (4.9/sq mi)
- Time zone: UTC+1 (CET)
  - Summer (DST): UTC+2 (CEST)
- Website: Official website

Ribota is a municipality located in the province of Segovia, Castile and León, Spain. According to the 2022 census (INE), the municipality has a population of 48 inhabitants.
