= Marazuela =

- Municipality
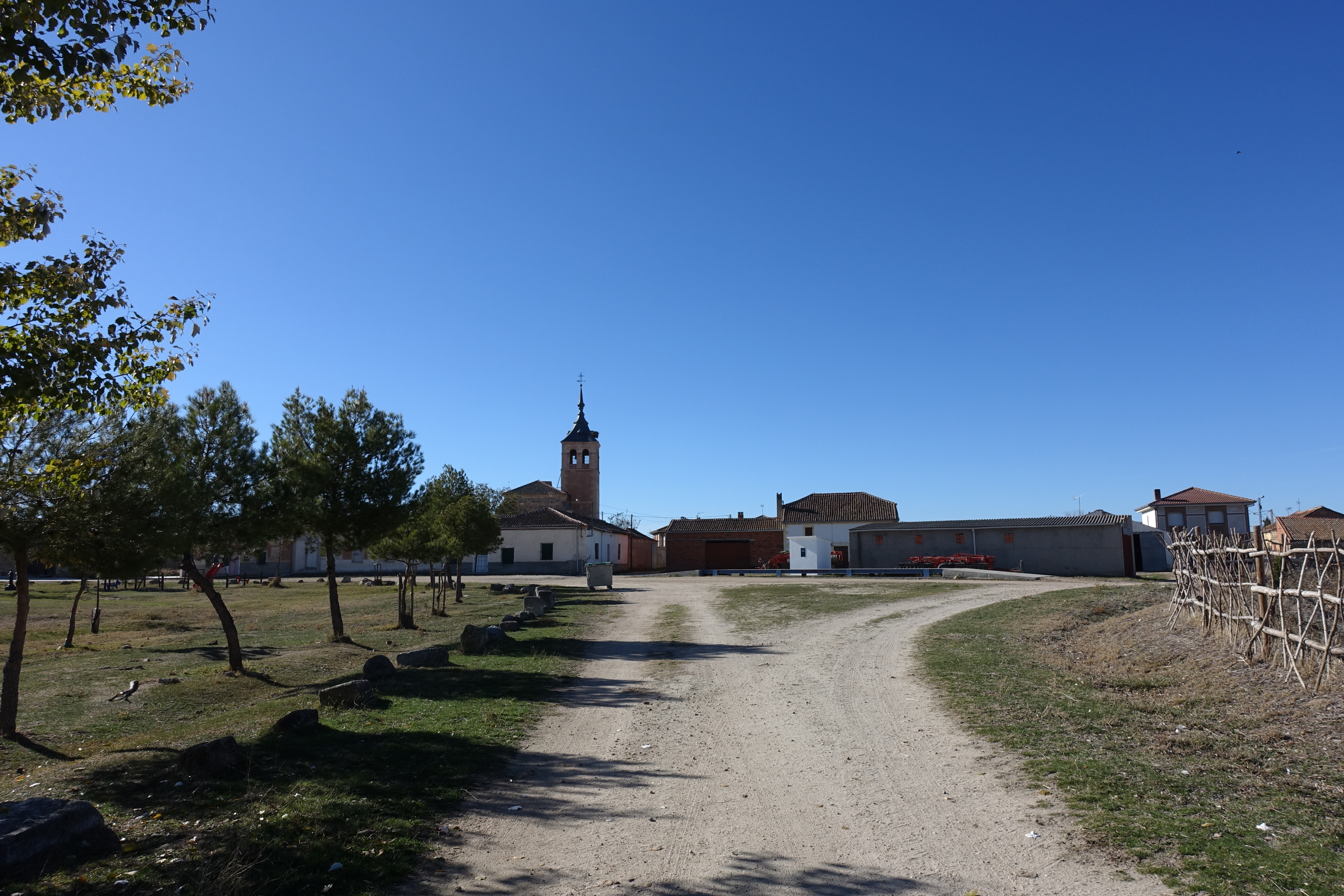

- Location in Spain. Marazuela (Spain)
- Coordinates: 40°58′40″N 4°21′55″W
- Country: Spain
- Autonomous community: Castile and León
- Province: Segovia
- Municipality: Marazuela

Area
  - Total: 15 km^{2} (5.8 sq mi)

Population (2025-01-01)
  - Total: 58
  - Density: 3.9/km^{2} (10/sq mi)
- Time zone: UTC+1 (CET)
  - Summer (DST): UTC+2 (CEST)
- Website: Official website

Marazuela is a municipality located in the province of Segovia, Castile and León, Spain. According to the 2004 census (INE), the municipality has a population of 61 inhabitants. Total area is 15 km^{2} (6 sq mi).
