= Pelayos del Arroyo =

- Municipality
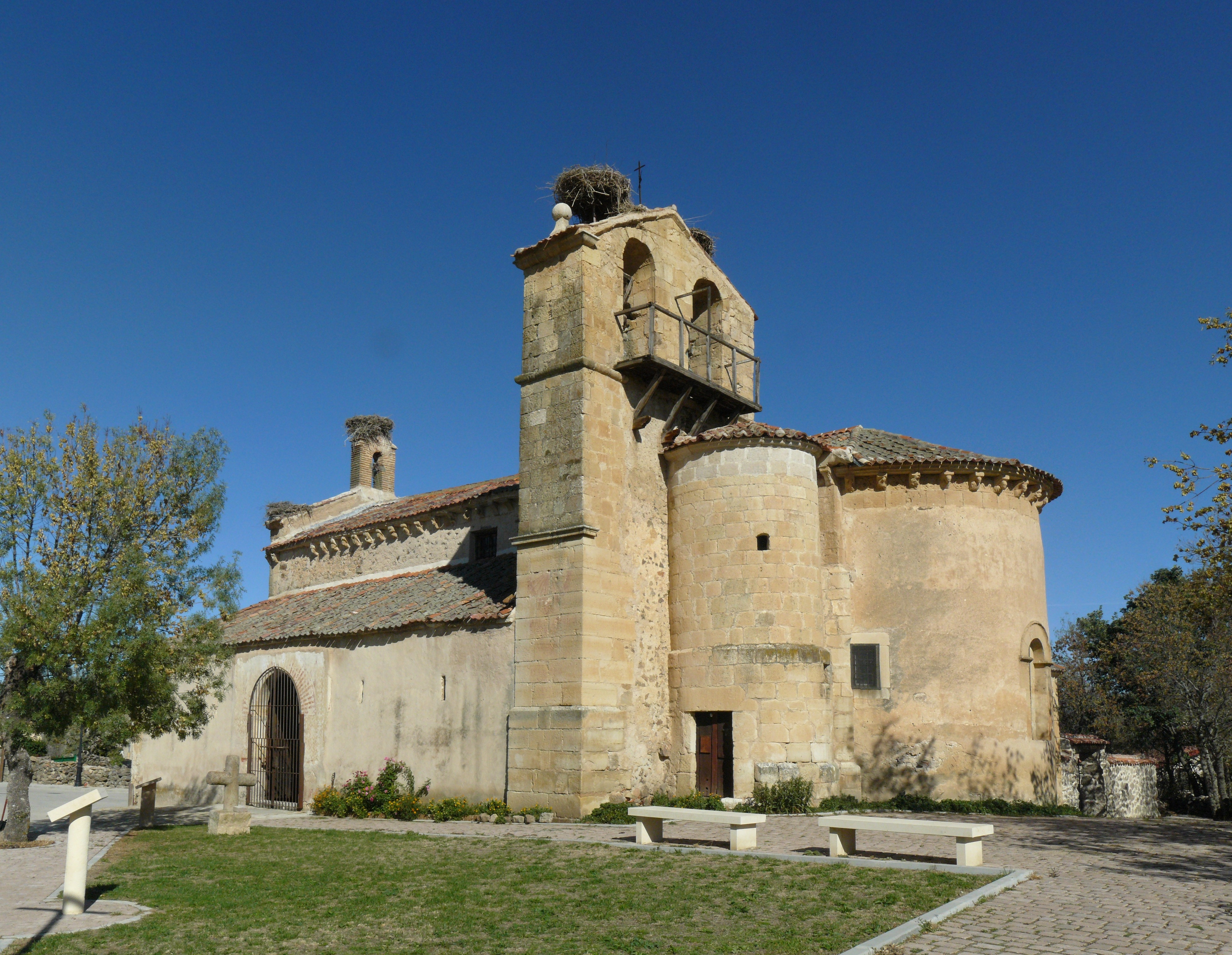
- View of the romanesque church of San Vicente Mártir, Pelayos del Arroyo (Segovia, Spain).

- Location in Spain. Pelayos del Arroyo (Spain)
- Coordinates: 41°03′04″N 3°56′22″W
- Country: Spain
- Autonomous community: Castile and León
- Province: Segovia
- Municipality: Pelayos del Arroyo

Area
  - Total: 12 km^{2} (4.6 sq mi)

Population (2025-01-01)
  - Total: 45
  - Density: 3.8/km^{2} (9.7/sq mi)
- Time zone: UTC+1 (CET)
  - Summer (DST): UTC+2 (CEST)
- Website: Official website

Pelayos del Arroyo is a municipality located in the province of Segovia, Castile and León, Spain. According to the 2004 census (INE), the municipality has a population of 60 inhabitants.
