= Orejana =

- Municipality
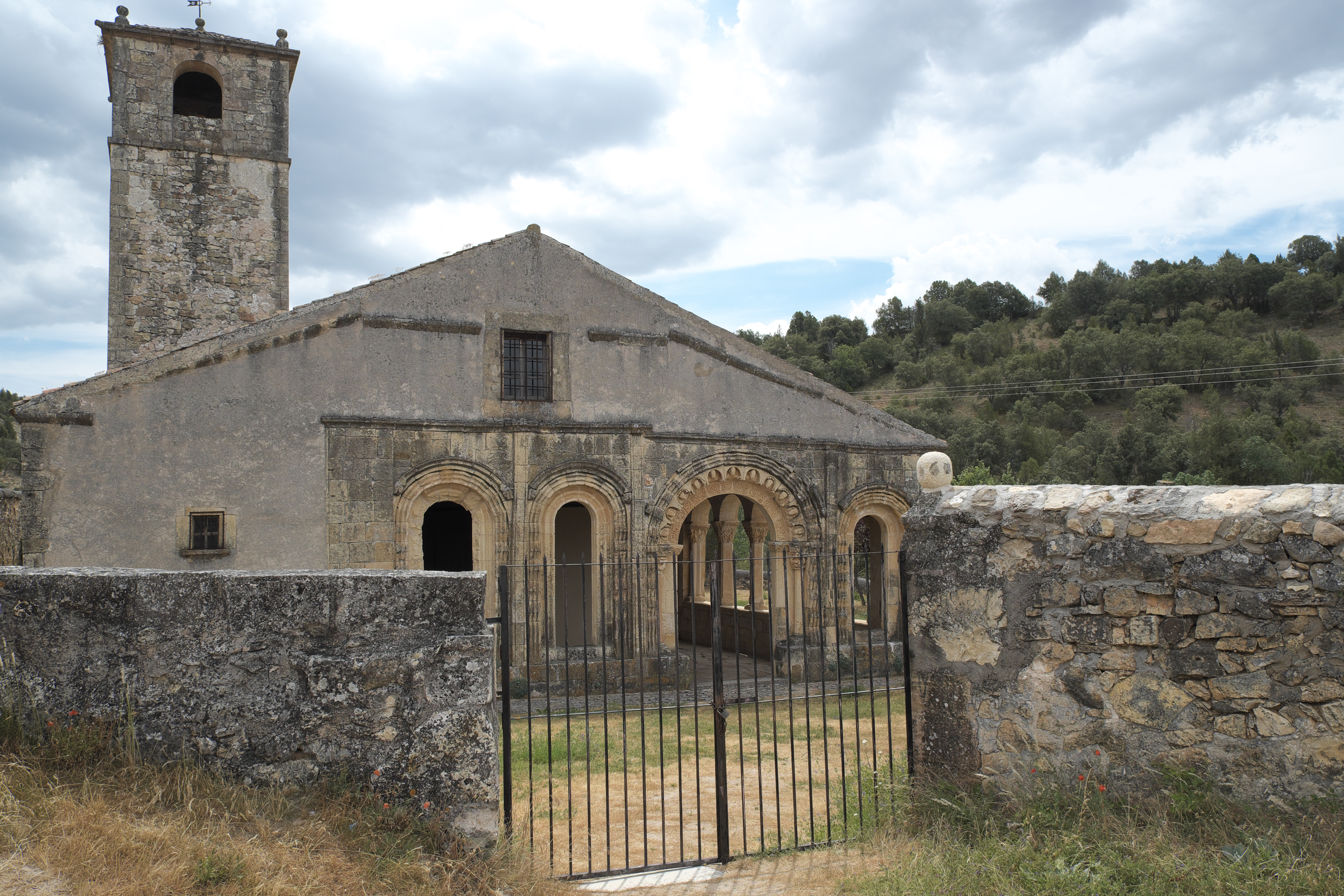
- Catholic Church of San Juan Bautista in Revilla de Orejana (Orejana) in the province of Segovia (Castile and León / Spain)

- Location in Spain. Orejana (Spain)
- Coordinates: 41°09′48″N 3°46′42″W
- Country: Spain
- Autonomous community: Castile and León
- Province: Segovia
- Municipality: Orejana

Area
  - Total: 21 km^{2} (8.1 sq mi)

Population (2025-01-01)
  - Total: 61
  - Density: 2.9/km^{2} (7.5/sq mi)
- Time zone: UTC+1 (CET)
  - Summer (DST): UTC+2 (CEST)
- Website: Official website

Orejana is a municipality located in the province of Segovia, Castile and León, Spain. According to the 2004 census (INE), the municipality has a population of 96 inhabitants.
