= Valdevacas y Guijar =

- Municipality
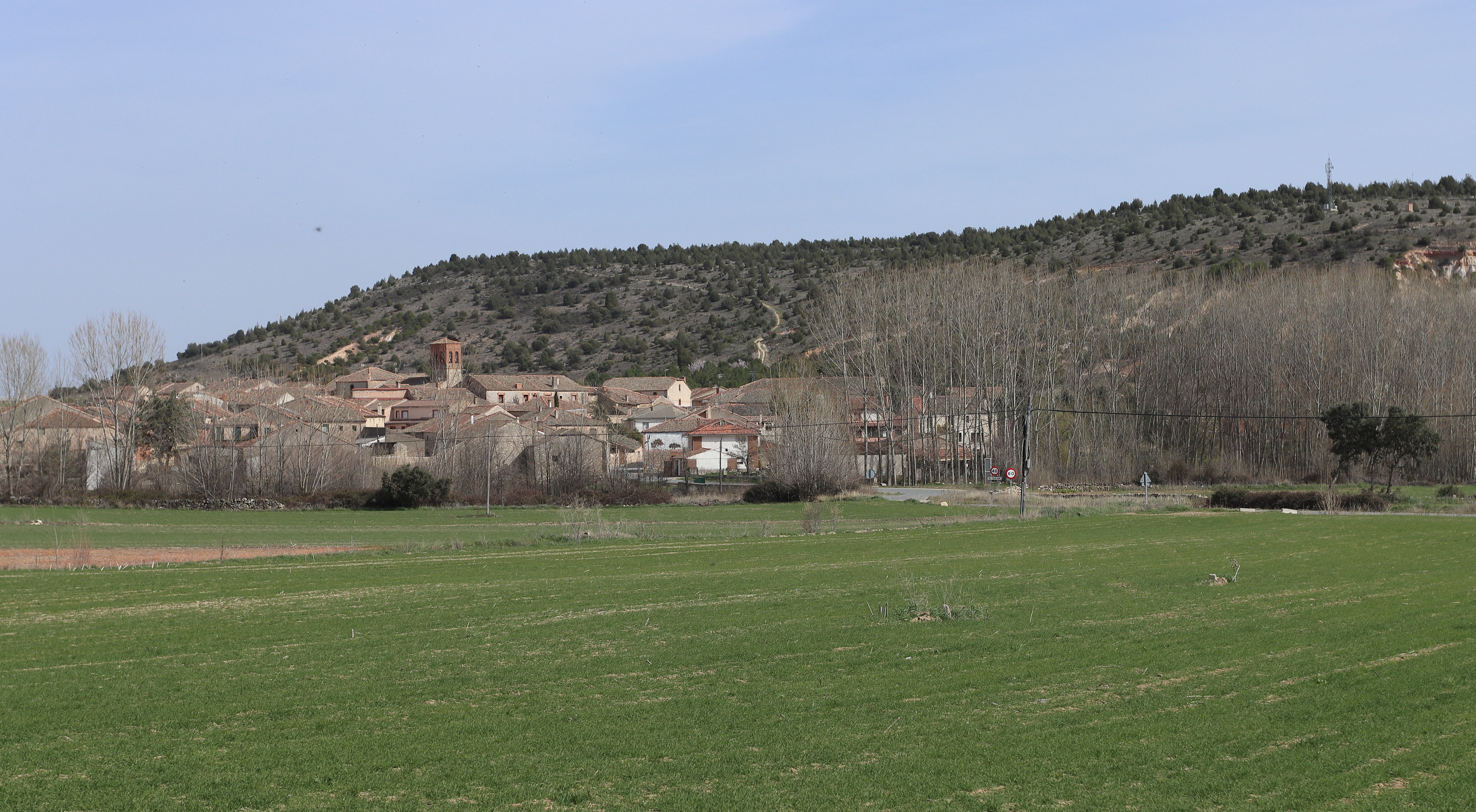

- Location in Spain. Valdevacas y Guijar (Spain)
- Coordinates: 41°08′12″N 3°54′46″W
- Country: Spain
- Autonomous community: Castile and León
- Province: Segovia
- Municipality: Valdevacas y Guijar

Area
  - Total: 18 km^{2} (6.9 sq mi)

Population (2025-01-01)
  - Total: 83
  - Density: 4.6/km^{2} (12/sq mi)
- Time zone: UTC+1 (CET)
  - Summer (DST): UTC+2 (CEST)
- Website: Official website

Valdevacas y Guijar is a municipality located in the province of Segovia, Castile and León, Spain. According to the 2004 census (INE), the municipality has a population of 139 inhabitants.

== Background ==
This little village in the Sierra Nevada foothills is actually two towns: El Guijar, where the municipality's Town Hall is located, and Valdevacas. They constitute what was once known as Guijar de Valdevacas, but is now officially known as Valdevacas and Guijar.
