= Aldeasoña =

- Municipality
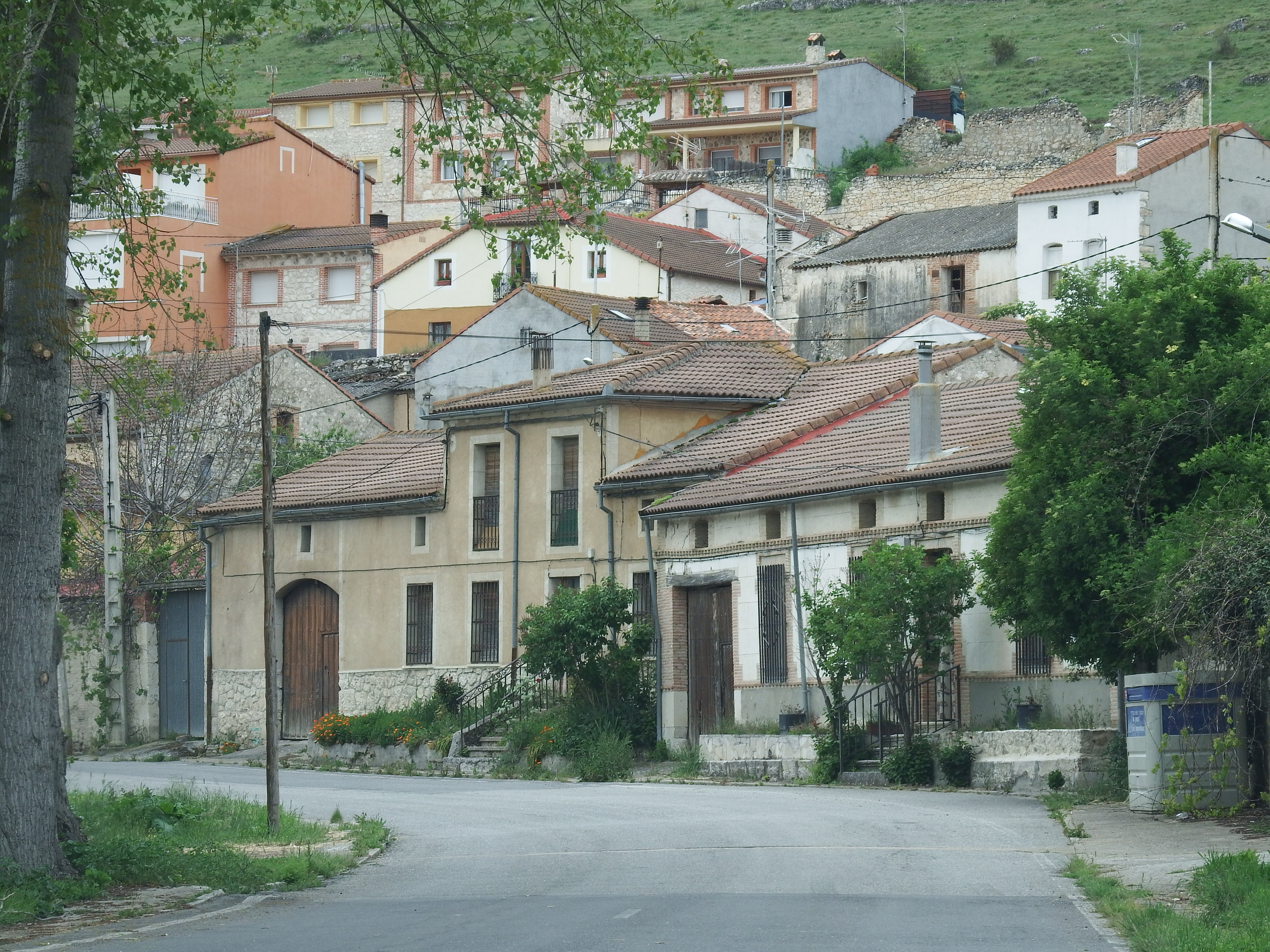

- Flag Coat of arms

- Location in Spain. Aldeasoña (Spain)
- Coordinates: 41°28′21″N 4°03′22″W
- Country: Spain
- Autonomous community: Castile and León
- Province: Segovia
- Municipality: Aldeasoña

Area
  - Total: 18.62 km^{2} (7.19 sq mi)
- Elevation: 833 m (2,733 ft)

Population (2025-01-01)
  - Total: 61
  - Density: 3.3/km^{2} (8.5/sq mi)
- Time zone: UTC+1 (CET)
  - Summer (DST): UTC+2 (CEST)
- Website: Official website

Aldeasoña is a municipality located in the province of Segovia, Castile and León, Spain. According to the 2004 census (INE), the municipality had a population of 82 inhabitants.
