= Marugán =

- Municipality
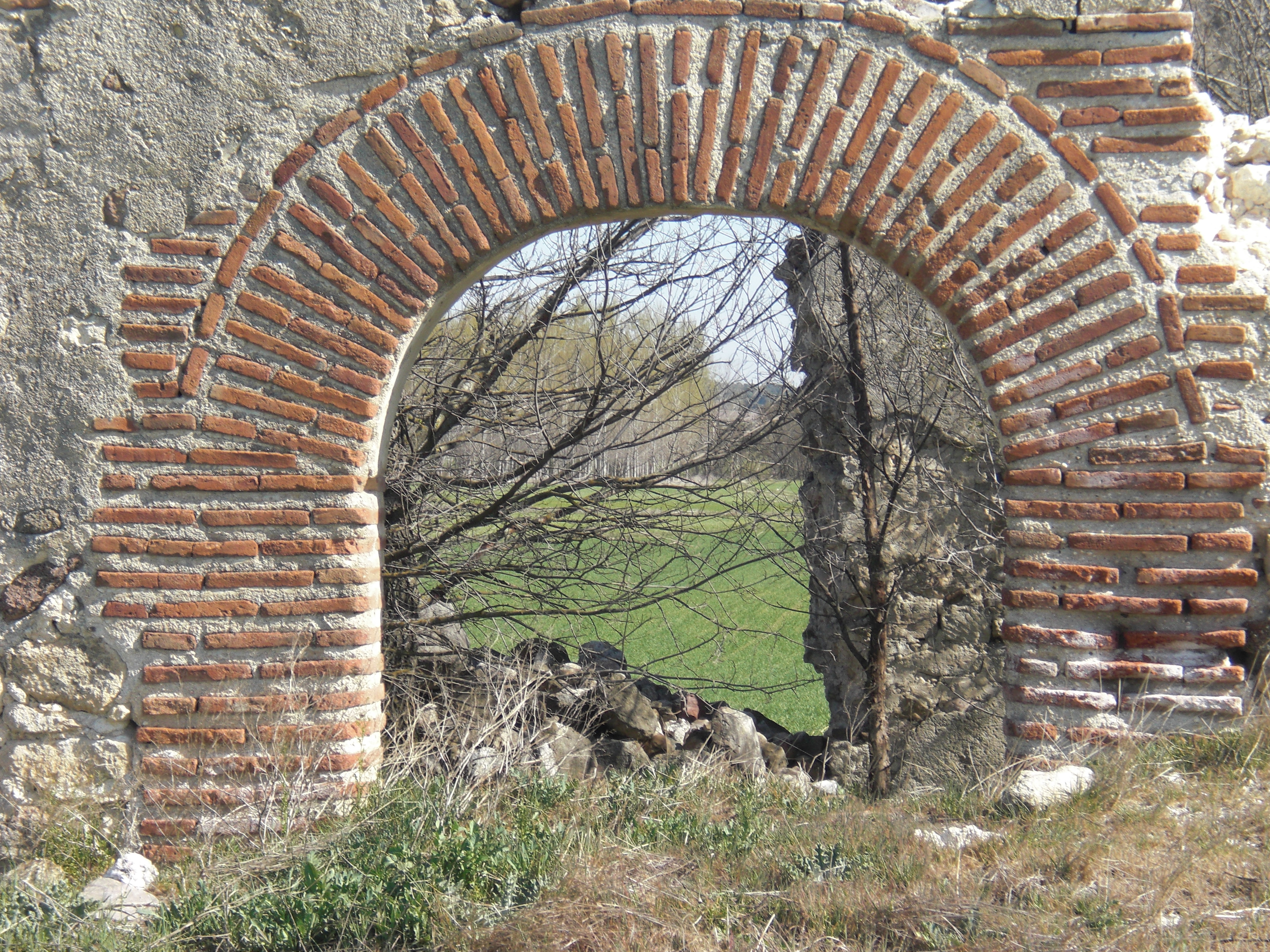
- Entrance of the Hermitage de Bernuy.

- Flag Coat of arms

- Location in Spain. Marugán (Spain)
- Coordinates: 40°53′46″N 4°23′03″W
- Country: Spain
- Autonomous community: Castile and León
- Province: Segovia
- Municipality: Marugán

Area
  - Total: 28 km^{2} (11 sq mi)

Population (2025-01-01)
  - Total: 775
  - Density: 28/km^{2} (72/sq mi)
- Time zone: UTC+1 (CET)
  - Summer (DST): UTC+2 (CEST)
- Website: Official website

Marugán is a municipality located in the province of Segovia, Castile and León, Spain. According to the 2009 census (INE), the municipality has a population of 634 inhabitants.

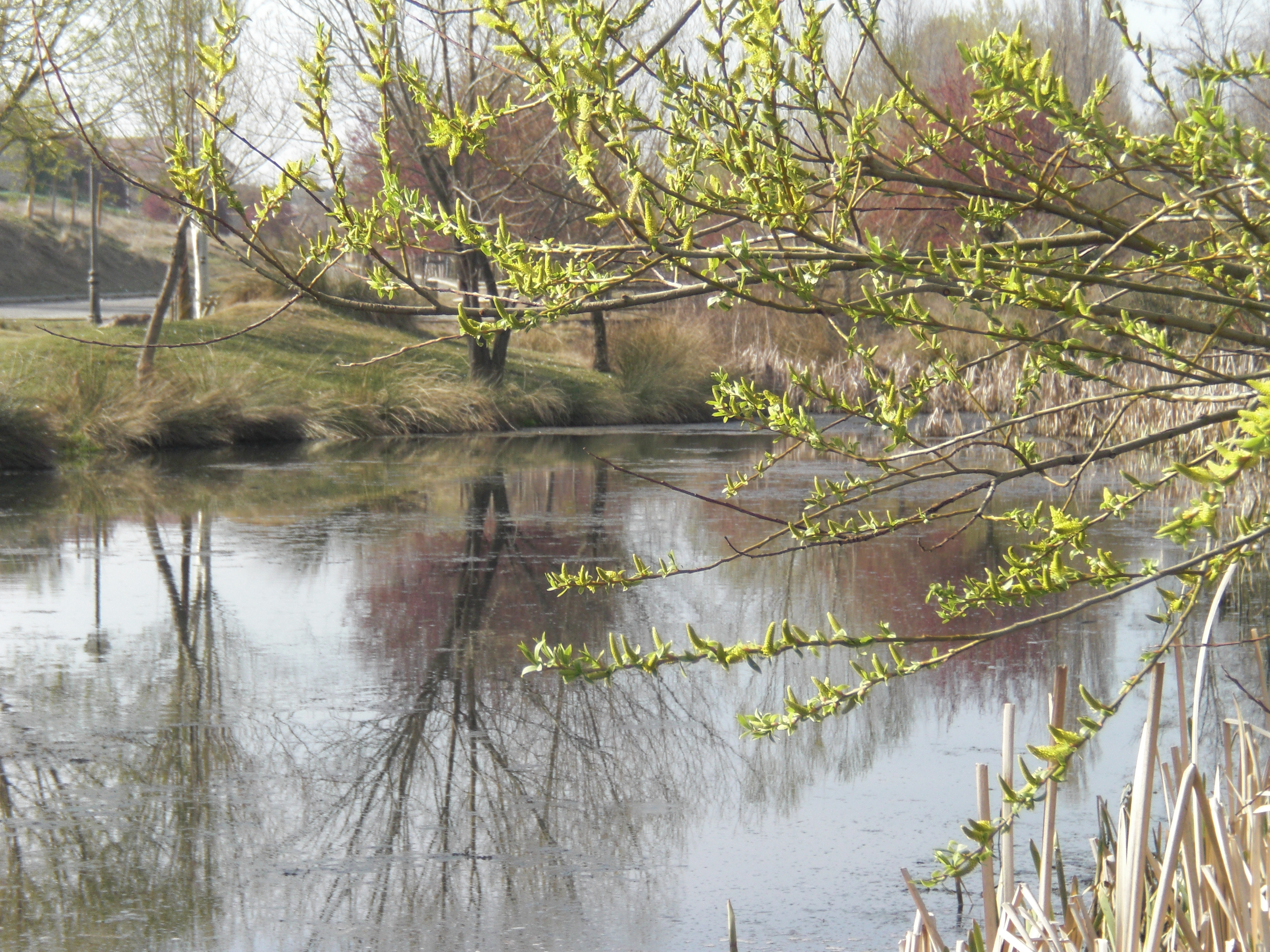
Park of Virgen de la Salud de Marugán.

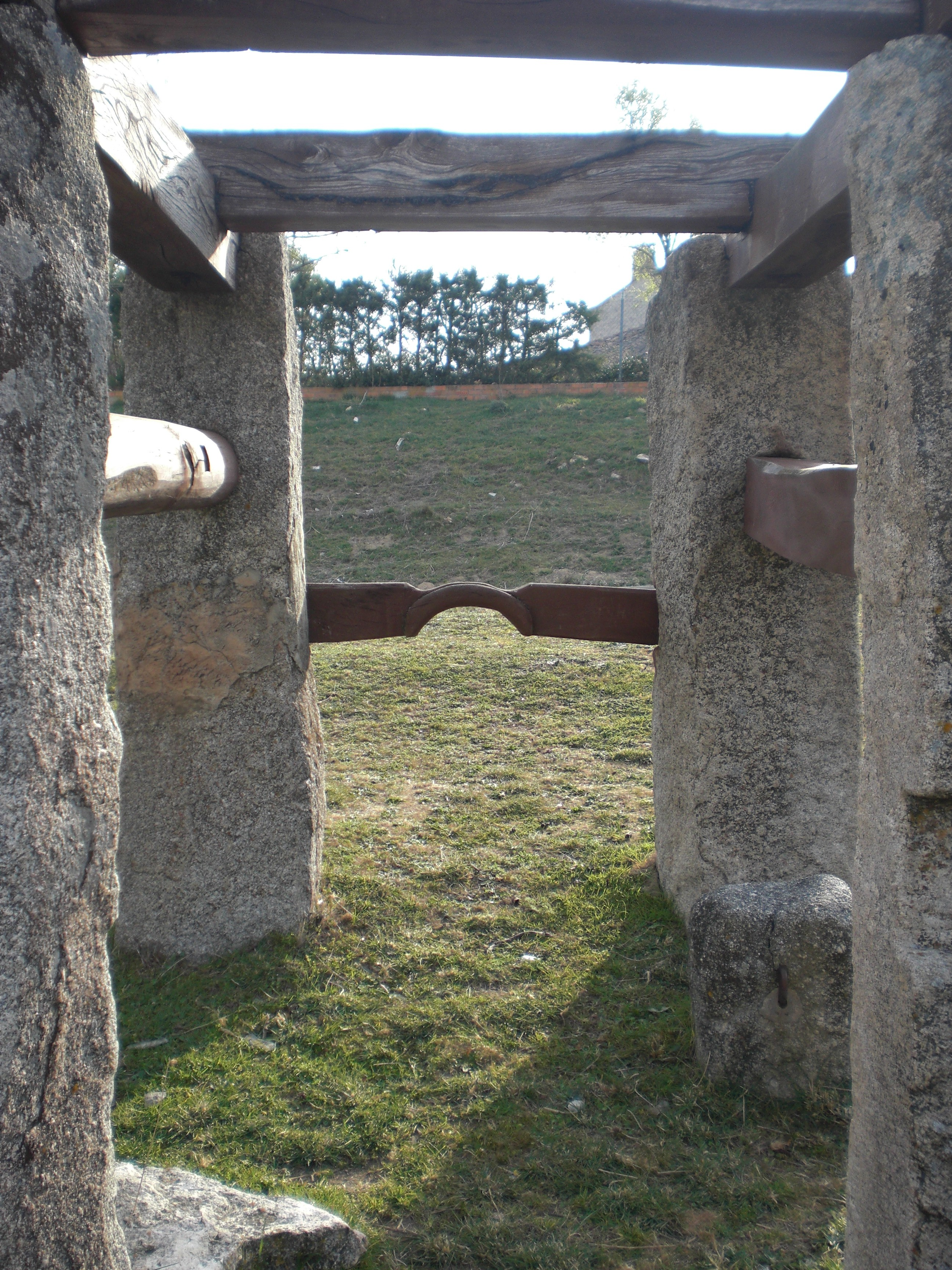
Ancient potro de herrar (Marugán).

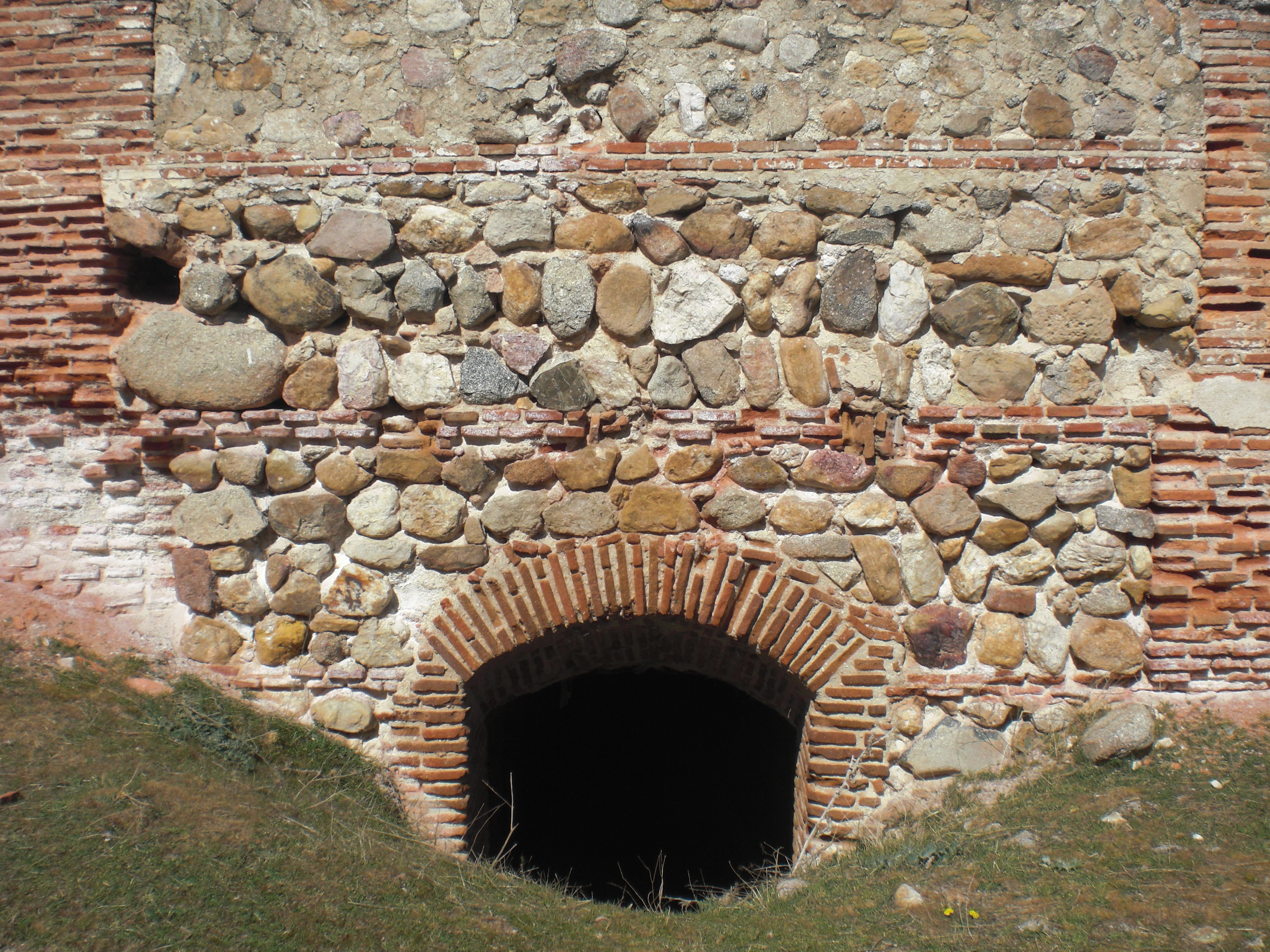
Ruins of Bernuy.

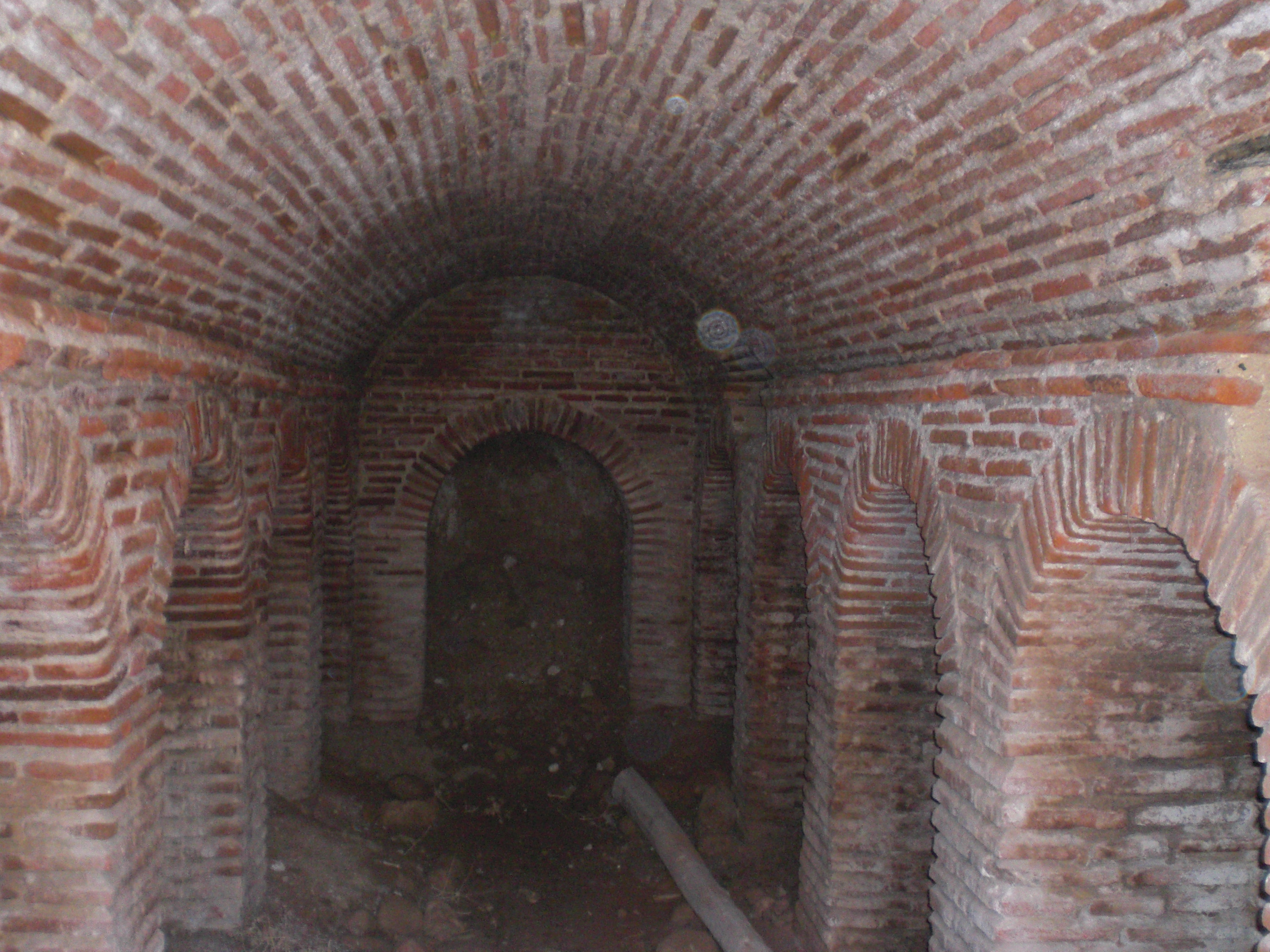
Subterranean entrance of the ruins of la granja de Bernuy de Párraces (Marugán).

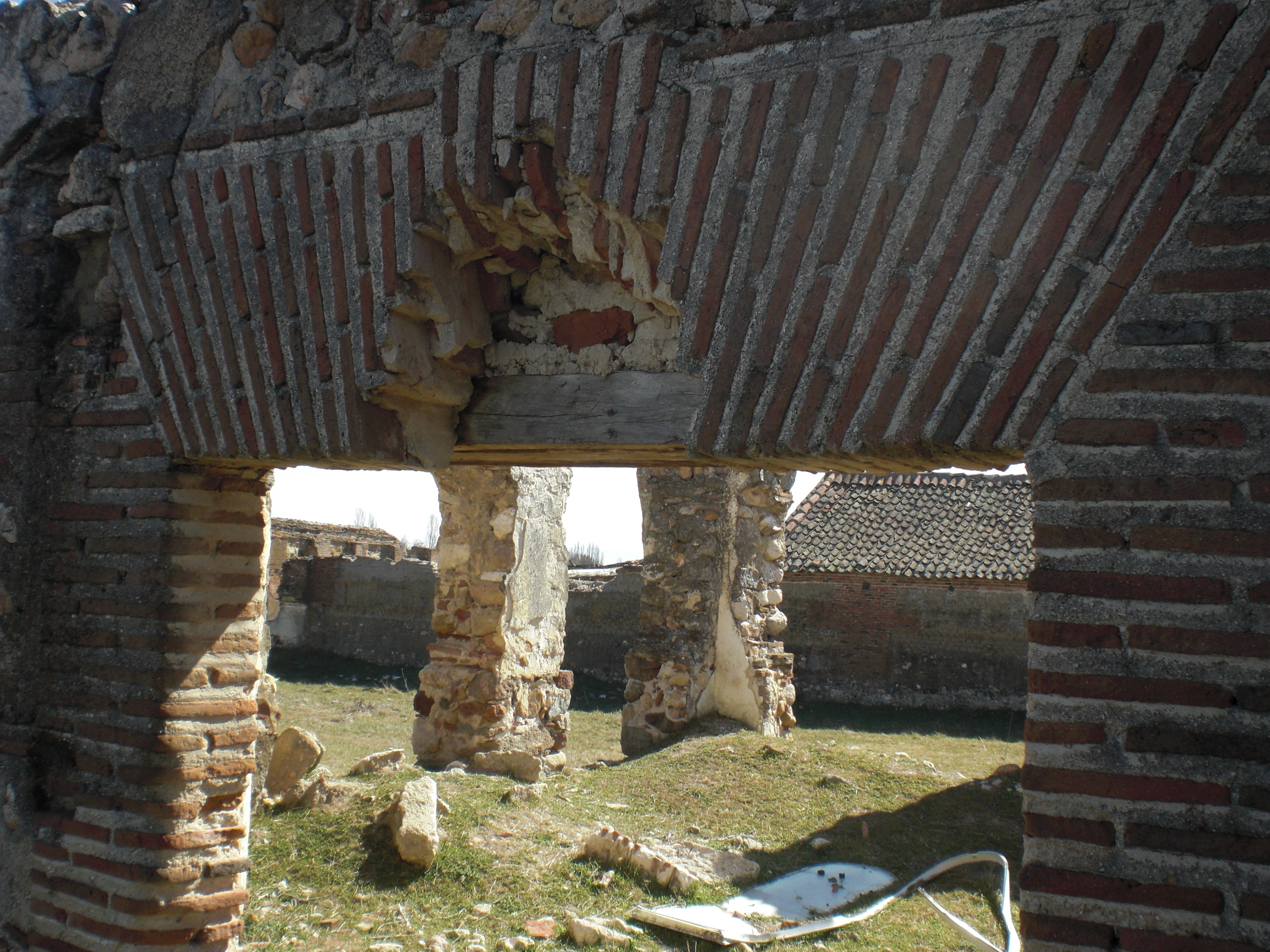
Puerta con dintel en ladrillo.
