= Montejo de la Vega de la Serrezuela =

- Municipality
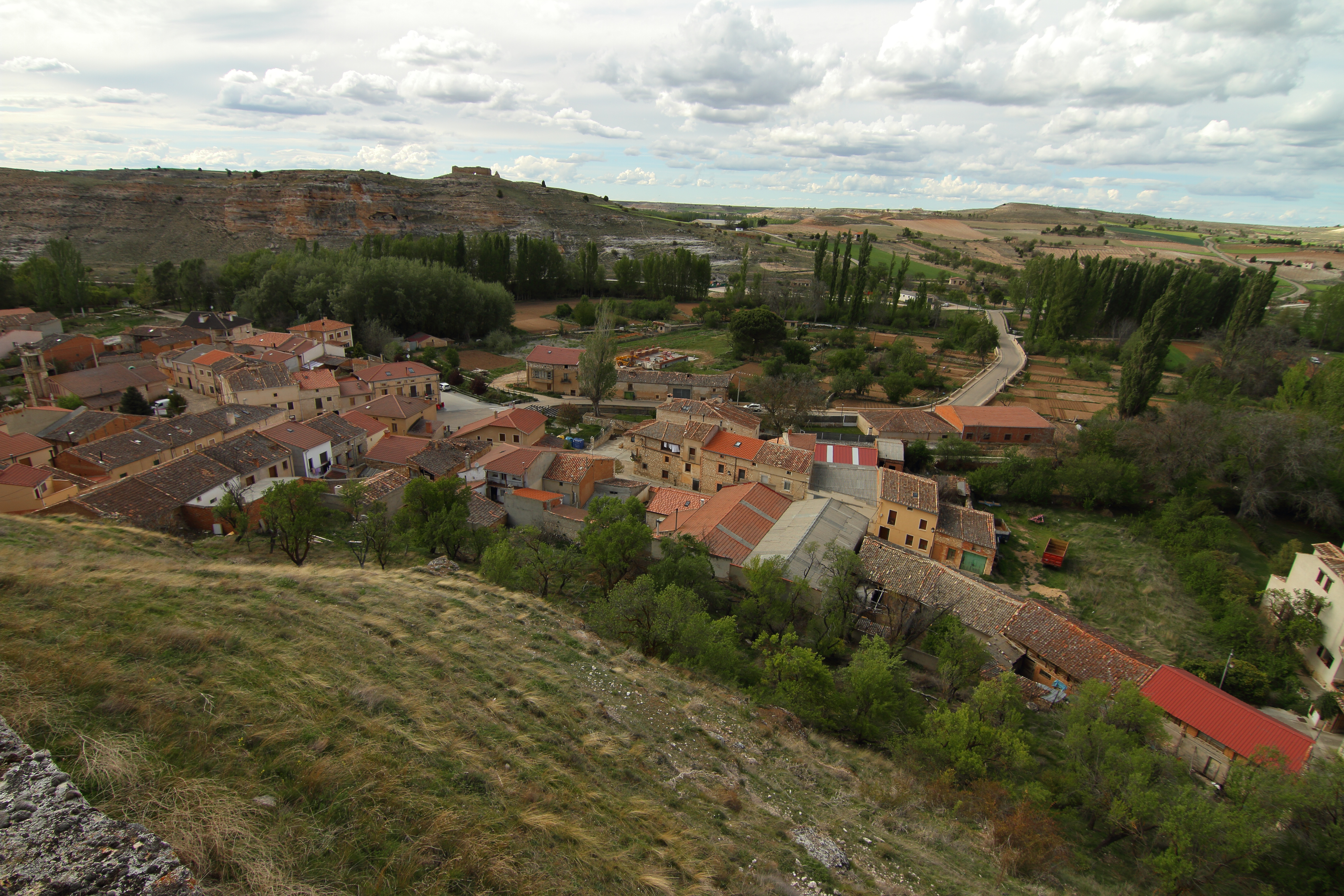
- view of Montejo de la Vega de la Serrezuela from top

- Location in Spain. Montejo de la Vega de la Serrezuela (Spain)
- Coordinates: 41°32′53″N 3°39′09″W
- Country: Spain
- Autonomous community: Castile and León
- Province: Segovia
- Municipality: Montejo de la Vega de la Serrezuela

Area
  - Total: 27 km^{2} (10 sq mi)

Population (2025-01-01)
  - Total: 121
  - Density: 4.5/km^{2} (12/sq mi)
- Time zone: UTC+1 (CET)
  - Summer (DST): UTC+2 (CEST)
- Website: Official website

Montejo de la Vega de la Serrezuela is a municipality located in the province of Segovia, Castile and León, Spain. According to the 2004 census (INE), the municipality has a population of 18008 inhabitants.
