= Castroserracín =

- Municipality
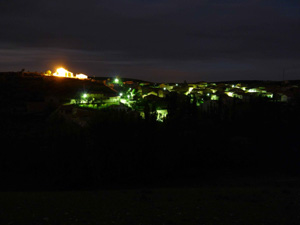

- Location in Spain. Castroserracín (Spain)
- Coordinates: 41°23′37″N 3°48′09″W
- Country: Spain
- Autonomous community: Castile and León
- Province: Segovia
- Municipality: Castroserracín

Area
  - Total: 21 km^{2} (8.1 sq mi)

Population (2025-01-01)
  - Total: 24
  - Density: 1.1/km^{2} (3.0/sq mi)
- Time zone: UTC+1 (CET)
  - Summer (DST): UTC+2 (CEST)
- Website: Official website

Castroserracín is a municipality located in the province of Segovia, Castile and León, Spain. According to the 2004 census (INE), the municipality has a population of 50 inhabitants.
