= Aldealengua de Pedraza =

- Municipality
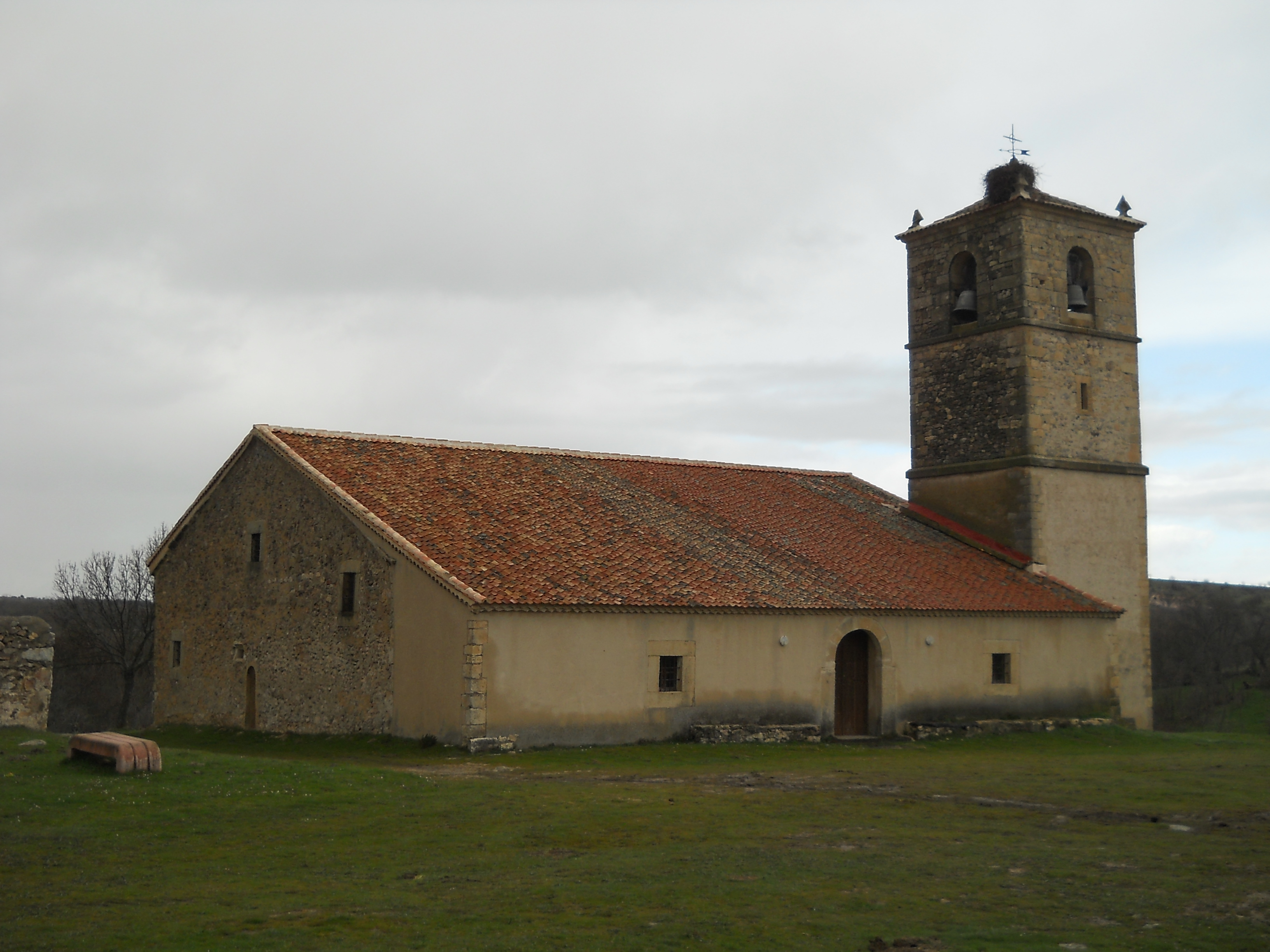
- Church of Our Lady of the Assumption, Aldealengua de Pedraza, Segovia, Spain

- Location in Spain. Aldealengua de Pedraza (Spain)
- Coordinates: 41°03′52″N 3°48′22″W
- Country: Spain
- Autonomous community: Castile and León
- Province: Segovia
- Municipality: Aldealengua de Pedraza

Area
  - Total: 35.17 km^{2} (13.58 sq mi)
- Elevation: 1,207 m (3,960 ft)

Population (2025-01-01)
  - Total: 78
  - Density: 2.2/km^{2} (5.7/sq mi)
- Time zone: UTC+1 (CET)
  - Summer (DST): UTC+2 (CEST)
- Website: Official website

Aldealengua de Pedraza is a municipality located in the province of Segovia, Castile and León, Spain. According to the 2004 census (INE), the municipality had a population of 89 inhabitants.
