= Rapariegos =

- Municipality
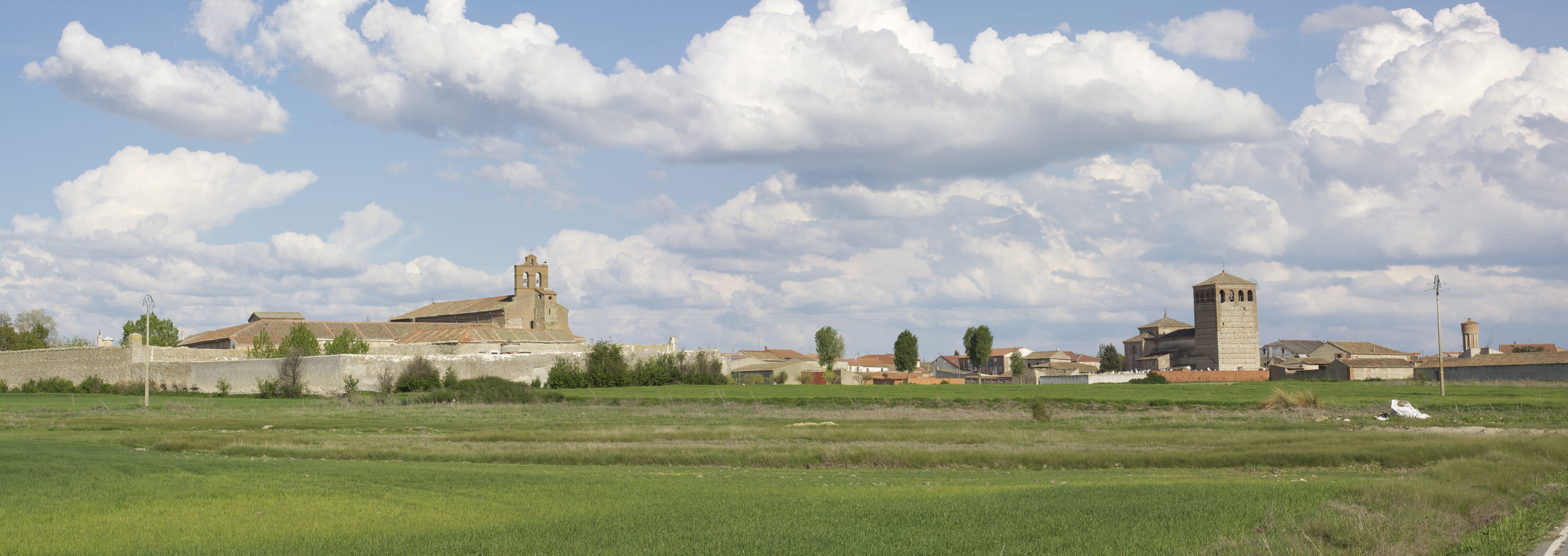

- Flag Coat of arms

- Location in Spain. Rapariegos (Spain)
- Coordinates: 41°05′38″N 4°39′08″W
- Country: Spain
- Autonomous community: Castile and León
- Province: Segovia
- Municipality: Rapariegos

Area
  - Total: 24 km^{2} (9.3 sq mi)

Population (2025-01-01)
  - Total: 187
  - Density: 7.8/km^{2} (20/sq mi)
- Time zone: UTC+1 (CET)
  - Summer (DST): UTC+2 (CEST)
- Website: Official website

Rapariegos is a municipality located in the province of Segovia, Castile and León, Spain. According to the 2011 census (INE), the municipality has a population of 230 inhabitants.

In this municipality was born the historian Cándido María Ajo González y Saínz de Zúñiga.
