= Codorniz =

- Municipality
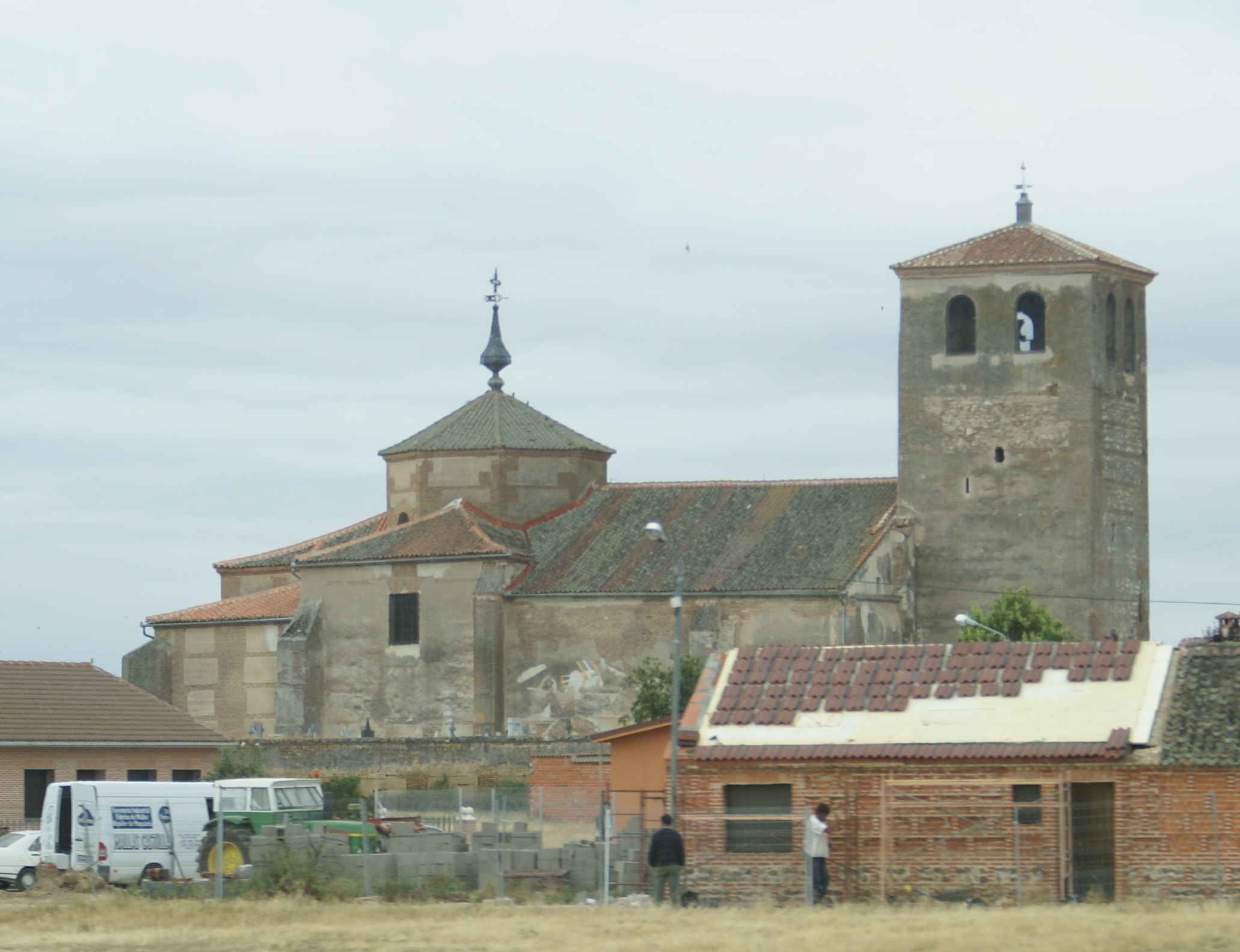
- Church of Santo Domingo de Silos.

- Flag Coat of arms

- Location in Spain. Codorniz (Spain)
- Coordinates: 41°04′00″N 4°35′58″W
- Country: Spain
- Autonomous community: Castile and León
- Province: Segovia
- Municipality: Codorniz

Area
  - Total: 64 km^{2} (25 sq mi)

Population (2025-01-01)
  - Total: 294
  - Density: 4.6/km^{2} (12/sq mi)
- Time zone: UTC+1 (CET)
  - Summer (DST): UTC+2 (CEST)
- Website: Official website

Codorniz is a municipality located in the province of Segovia, Castile and León, Spain. According to the 2025 census (INE), the municipality has a population of 294 inhabitants. It includes two population centers: Codorniz and Montuenga.

== Gallery ==
Montuenga - Church of the San Bartolomé

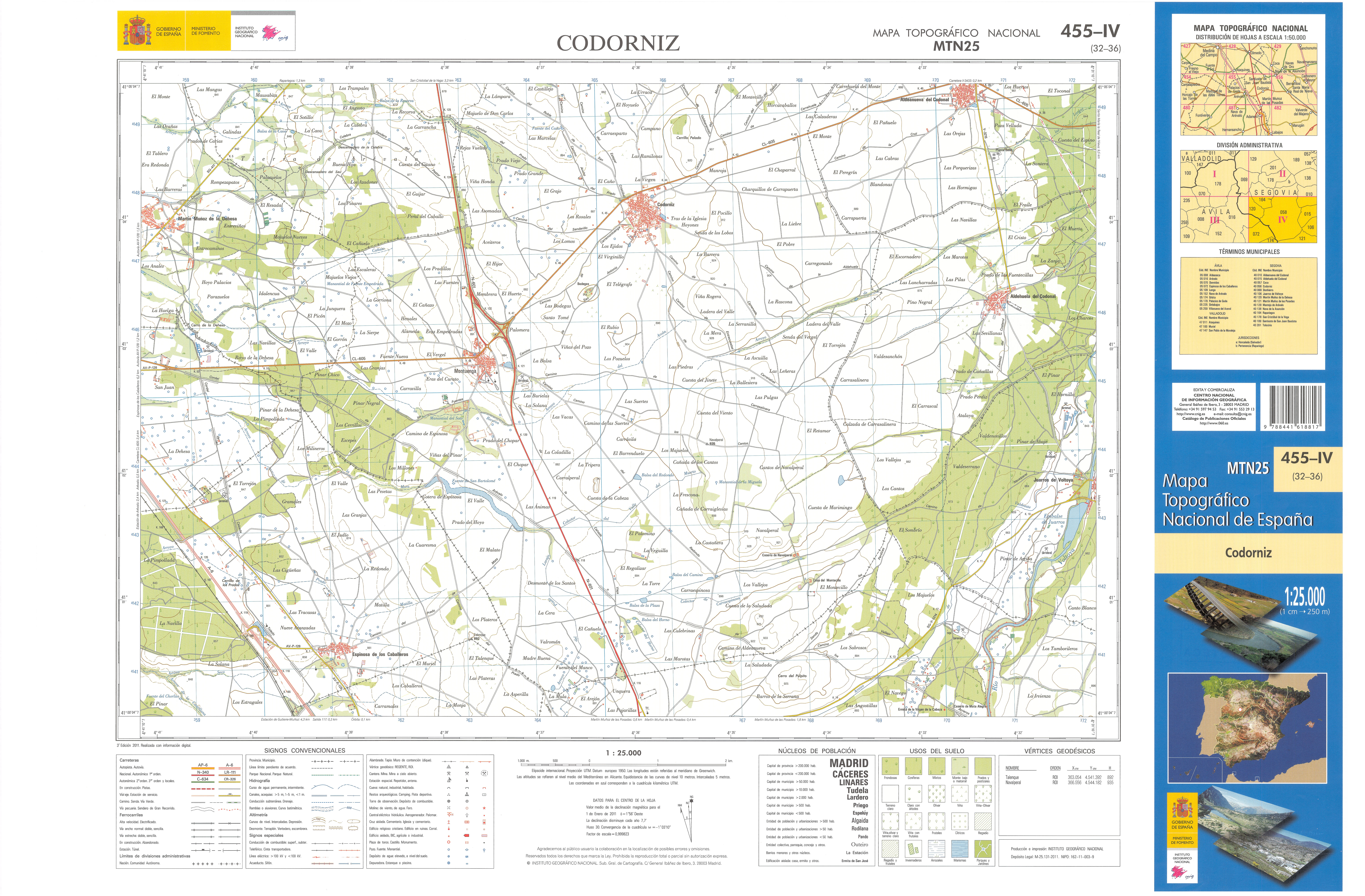
Fragment of sheet 455 of the National Topographic Map of Spain of 2011 in which part of Codorniz is represented.
