= Añe =

- Municipality
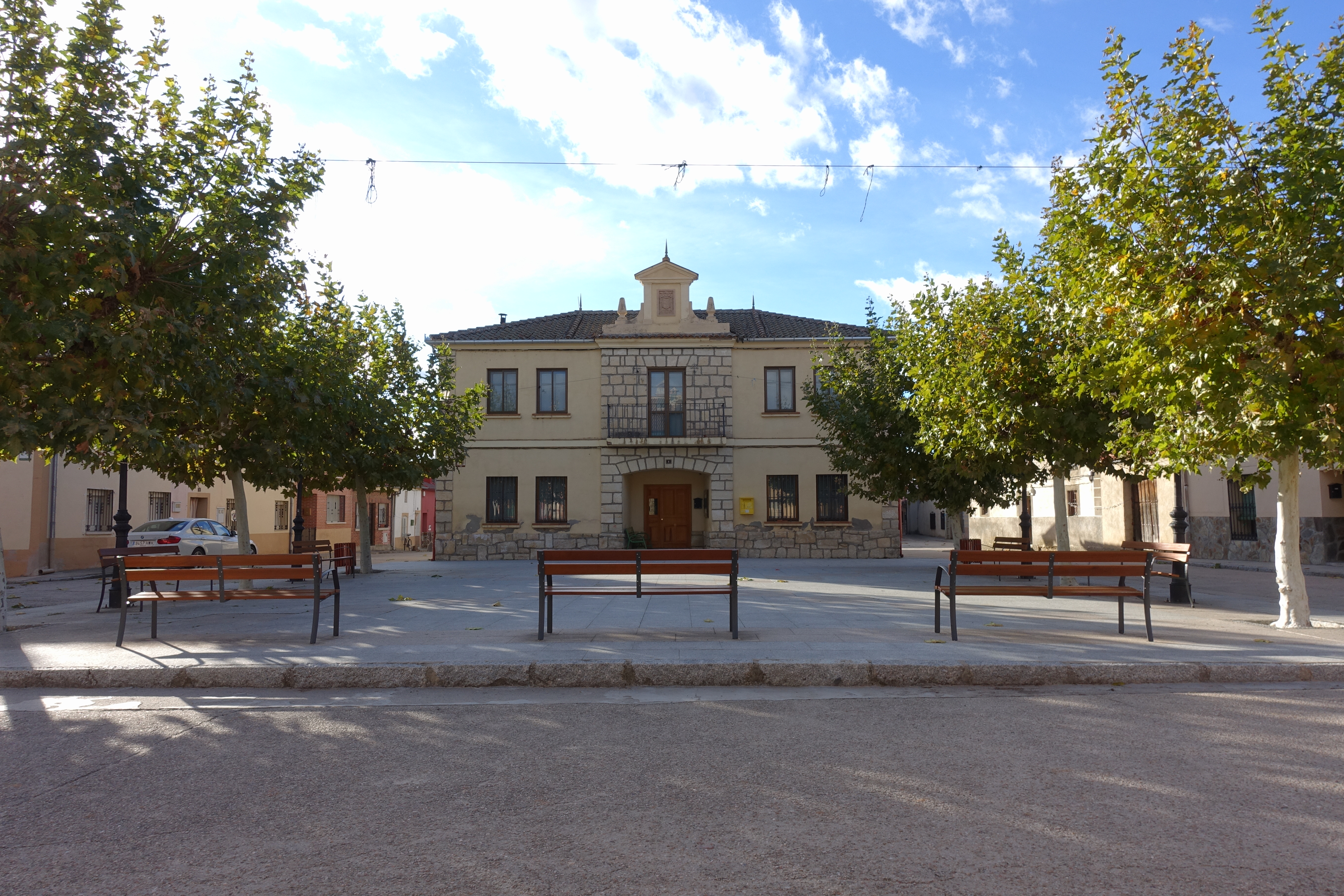

- Location in Spain. Añe (Spain)
- Coordinates: 41°02′18″N 4°17′47″W
- Country: Spain
- Autonomous community: Castile and León
- Province: Segovia
- Municipality: Añe

Area
  - Total: 11.62 km^{2} (4.49 sq mi)
- Elevation: 878 m (2,881 ft)

Population (2025-01-01)
  - Total: 67
  - Density: 5.8/km^{2} (15/sq mi)
- Time zone: UTC+1 (CET)
  - Summer (DST): UTC+2 (CEST)
- Website: Official website

Añe is a municipality located in the province of Segovia, Castile and León, Spain. According to the 2004 census (INE), the municipality had a population of 126 inhabitants.
