= Bercimuel =

- Municipality
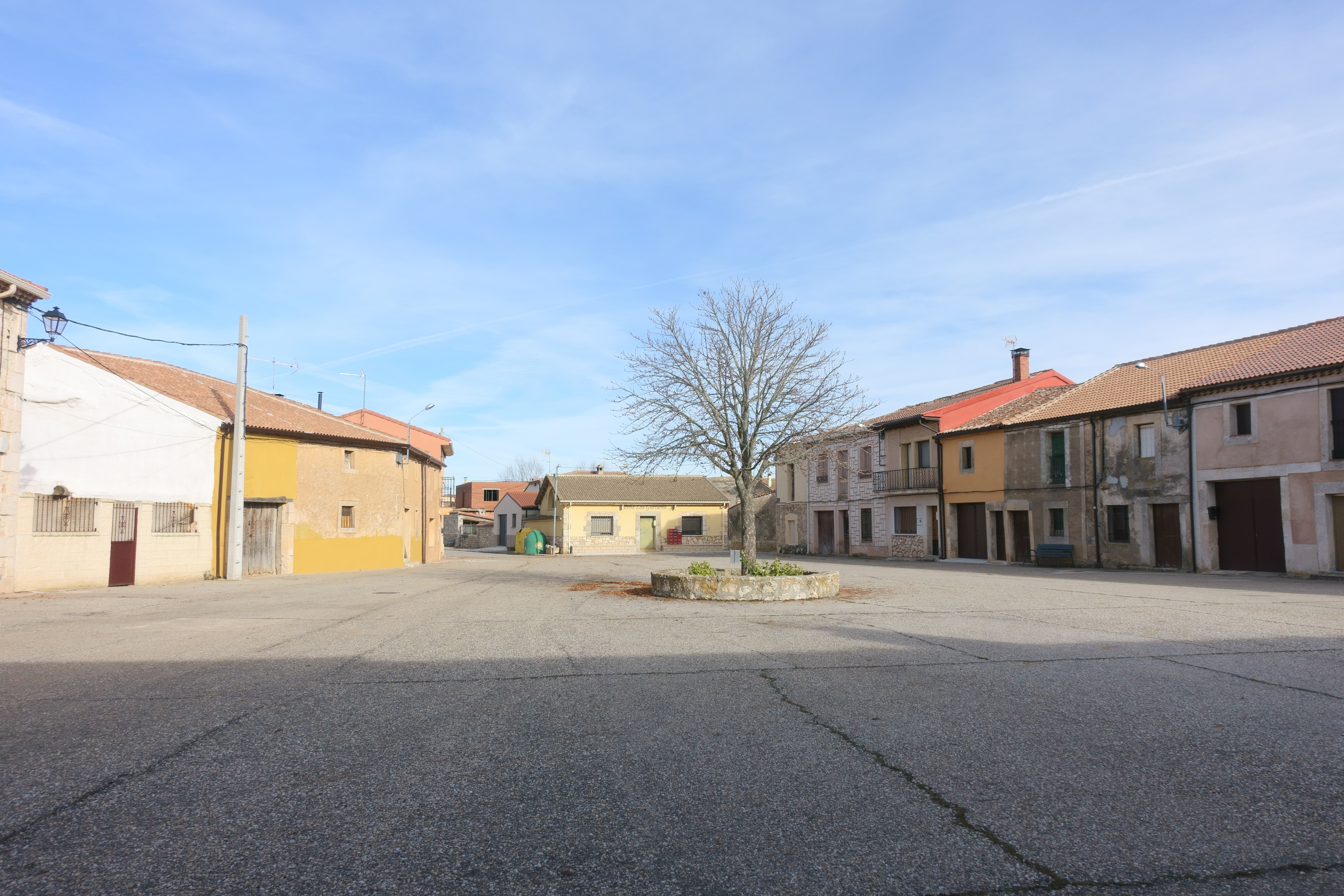
- View of Bercimuel

- Flag Coat of arms

- Location in Spain. Bercimuel (Spain)
- Coordinates: 41°23′56″N 3°34′12″W
- Country: Spain
- Autonomous community: Castile and León
- Province: Segovia
- Municipality: Bercimuel

Area
  - Total: 12.17 km^{2} (4.70 sq mi)
- Elevation: 966 m (3,169 ft)

Population (2025-01-01)
  - Total: 34
  - Density: 2.8/km^{2} (7.2/sq mi)
- Time zone: UTC+1 (CET)
  - Summer (DST): UTC+2 (CEST)
- Website: Official website

Bercimuel is a municipality located in the province of Segovia, Castile and León, Spain. According to the 2004 census (INE), the municipality had a population of 84 inhabitants.
