= Armuña =

- Municipality
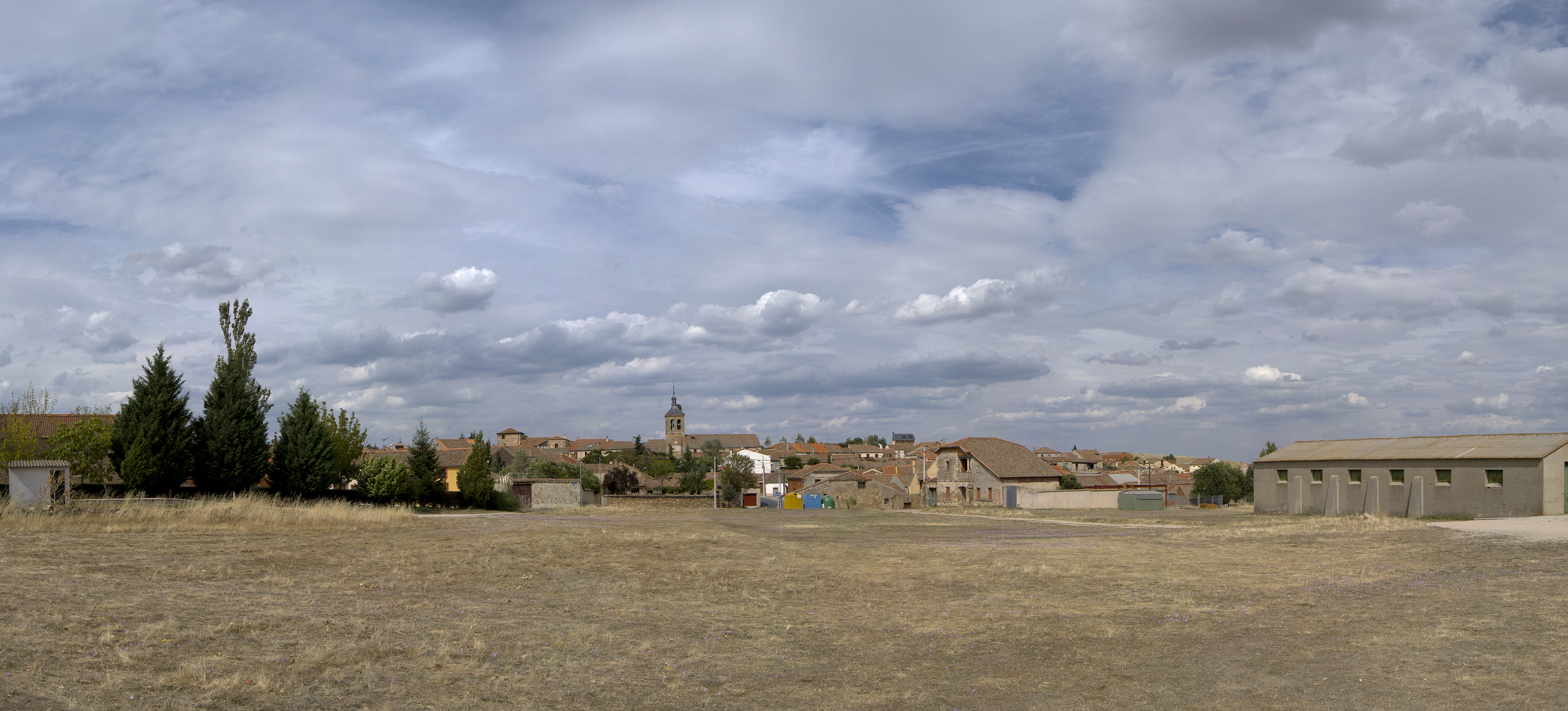
- Far view of Armuña

- Flag Coat of arms

- Location in Spain. Armuña (Spain)
- Coordinates: 41°04′38″N 4°19′09″W
- Country: Spain
- Autonomous community: Castile and León
- Province: Segovia
- Municipality: Armuña

Area
  - Total: 45.84 km^{2} (17.70 sq mi)
- Elevation: 903 m (2,963 ft)

Population (2025-01-01)
  - Total: 253
  - Density: 5.52/km^{2} (14.3/sq mi)
- Time zone: UTC+1 (CET)
  - Summer (DST): UTC+2 (CEST)
- Website: Official website

Armuña is a municipality located in the province of Segovia, Castile and León, Spain. According to the 2004 census (INE), the municipality had a population of 247 inhabitants.
