= Castroserna de Abajo =

- Municipality
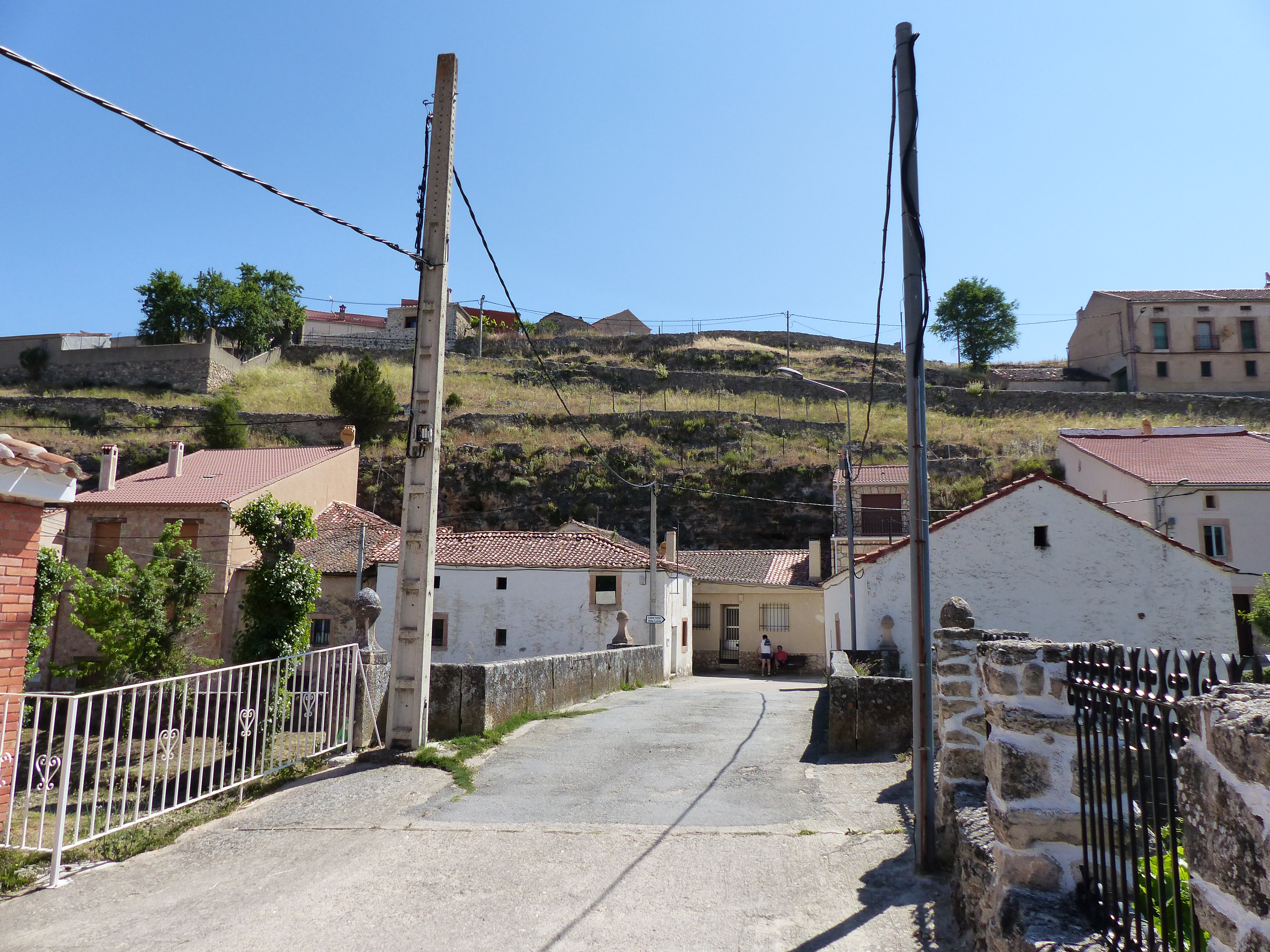
- Castroserna de Abajo in 2016

- Location in Spain. Castroserna de Abajo (Spain)
- Coordinates: 41°12′26″N 3°44′06″W
- Country: Spain
- Autonomous community: Castile and León
- Province: Segovia
- Municipality: Castroserna de Abajo

Area
  - Total: 12 km^{2} (4.6 sq mi)

Population (2025-01-01)
  - Total: 31
  - Density: 2.6/km^{2} (6.7/sq mi)
- Time zone: UTC+1 (CET)
  - Summer (DST): UTC+2 (CEST)
- Website: Official website

Castroserna de Abajo is a municipality located in the province of Segovia, Castile and León, Spain. According to the 2004 census (INE), the municipality has a population of 49 inhabitants.
