= Alconada de Maderuelo =

- Municipality
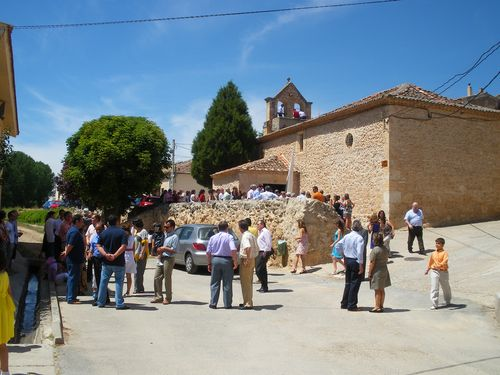

- Alconada de Maderuelo within Segovia

- Location in Spain. Alconada de Maderuelo (Spain)
- Coordinates: 41°27′00″N 3°29′09″W
- Country: Spain
- Autonomous community: Castile and León
- Province: Segovia
- Municipality: Alconada de Maderuelo

Government
  - Mayor: María Pilar Berzal Martín

Area
  - Total: 12.07 km^{2} (4.66 sq mi)
- Elevation: 948 m (3,110 ft)

Population (2025-01-01)
  - Total: 23
  - Density: 1.9/km^{2} (4.9/sq mi)
- Time zone: UTC+1 (CET)
  - Summer (DST): UTC+2 (CEST)
- Website: Official website

Alconada de Maderuelo is a municipality located in the province of Segovia, Castile and León, Spain. According to the 2004 census (INE), the municipality had a population of 52 inhabitants.
