= Fuentesoto =

- Municipality
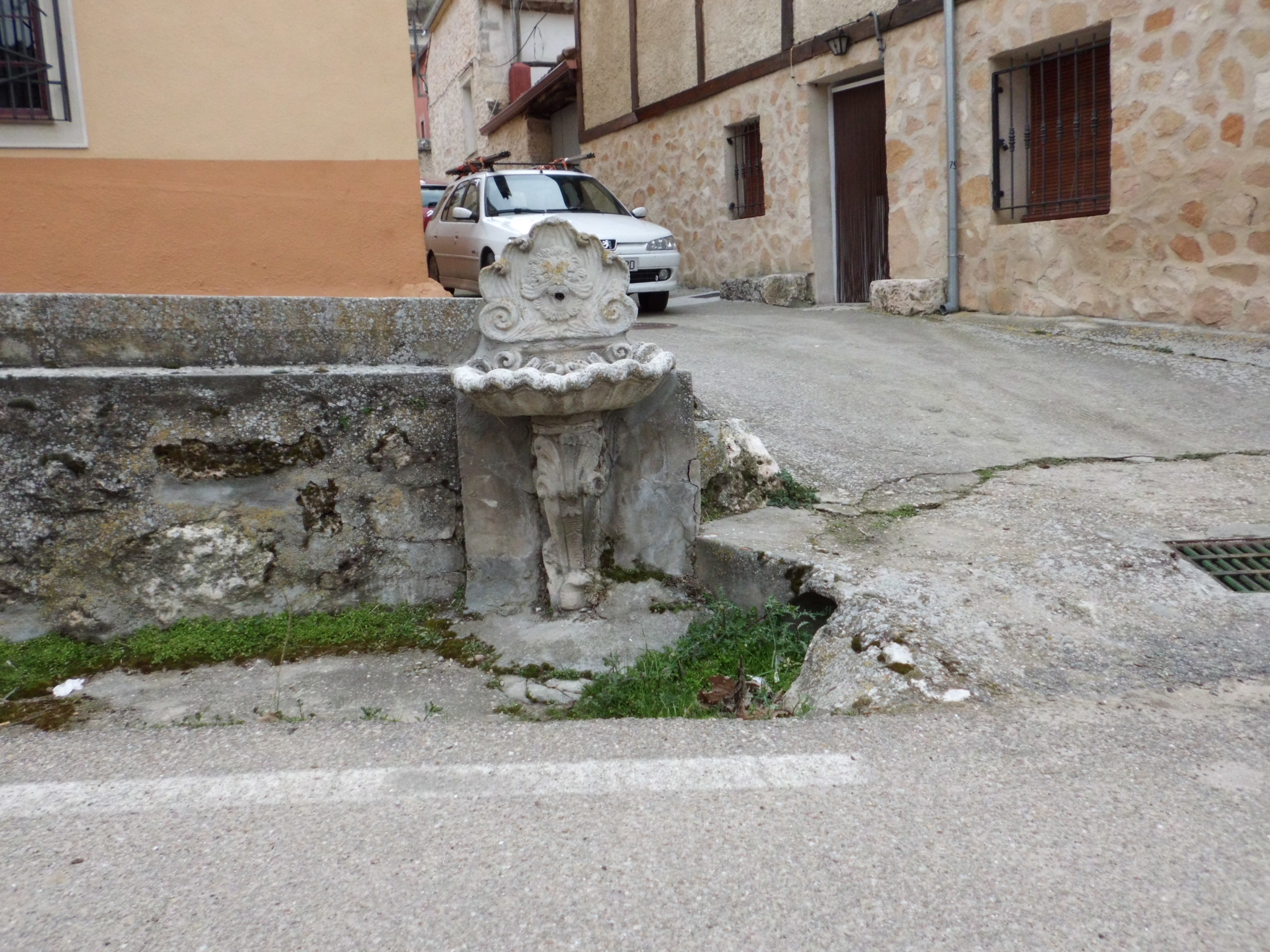
- Public fountain in the Segovian town of Fuentesoto, Spain.

- Flag Coat of arms

- Location in Spain. Fuentesoto (Spain)
- Coordinates: 41°27′23″N 3°55′06″W
- Country: Spain
- Autonomous community: Castile and León
- Province: Segovia
- Municipality: Fuentesoto

Area
  - Total: 29 km^{2} (11 sq mi)
- Elevation: 920 m (3,020 ft)

Population (2025-01-01)
  - Total: 96
  - Density: 3.3/km^{2} (8.6/sq mi)
- Time zone: UTC+1 (CET)
  - Summer (DST): UTC+2 (CEST)
- Website: Official website

Fuentesoto is a municipality located in the province of Segovia, Castile and León, Spain. According to the 2009 census (INE), the municipality has a population of 178 inhabitants.

The village lies in a hole at the bottom of the source from which it is named, and the river Fuentesoto born, on the banks, with forests of poplar, there were many orchards, of which only retain a few.

Celebrates its patron saint on June 29, feast of St. Peter the Apostle. It also celebrates the feast of San Vicente, for a week in August. In the context of this holiday is celebrated in St. Vicente, second or third Saturday in August, depending on the year, the Lantern Procession. Is a procession, which moved to St. Vicente, from Hermitage to the St. Peter Church's, where it will be during the holidays in their honor. The route, within the village, is accompanied by thousands of candles placed along the streets and lighting up the church itself, where, at the end of the procession, performed a concert of classical music.

Buildings of interest

The former Visigothic church, with some Romanesque elements of St. Gregorio. Situated high on a hill overlooking the village. It still preserves the ancient seat of the Church and numerous stone crosses, Visigothic style. Beside it is the cemetery, blessed as such on December 26, 1826. The ordeal, which runs from the Church of San Pedro to the ancient Church has crosses dating from 1783. It has been restored recently, fixing the old bell tower, adapting it as a viewpoint and the head of the Church.

The present church of St. Peter in the town square. Baroque style, the era of Charles III, as evidenced by an inscription, simple and unobtrusive style. The first written mention it is 1769. From 1780 and are held every liturgy in this church.

The hermitage of St. Vicente Martyr, on the outskirts of Fuentesoto (old village of St. Vicente de Pospozuelo), just one kilometer from the village. It is a Romanesque building of the 12th century, which include the apse and the decoration of his columns, both indoors and outdoors. The outside is decorated with acanthus leaves on top and with pairs of taps at the bottom. It was restored in 1989.
