= Cilleruelo de San Mamés =

- Municipality
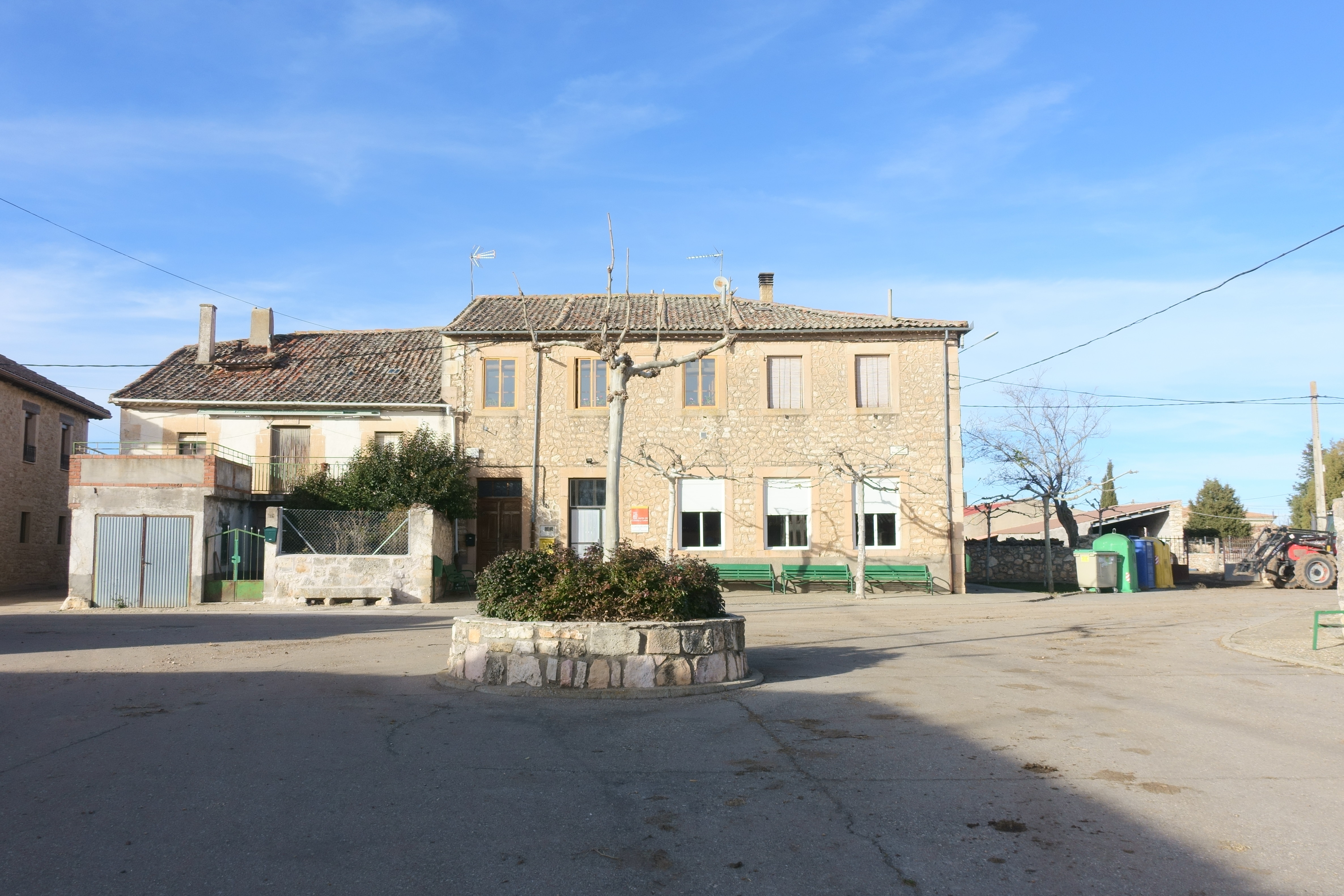
- Plaza de San Mamés, in Cilleruelo de San Mamés (Segovia, Spain).

- Location in Spain. Cilleruelo de San Mamés (Spain)
- Coordinates: 41°25′55″N 3°33′59″W
- Country: Spain
- Autonomous community: Castile and León
- Province: Segovia
- Municipality: Cilleruelo de San Mamés

Area
  - Total: 9.73 km^{2} (3.76 sq mi)
- Elevation: 982 m (3,222 ft)

Population (2025-01-01)
  - Total: 41
  - Density: 4.2/km^{2} (11/sq mi)
- Time zone: UTC+1 (CET)
  - Summer (DST): UTC+2 (CEST)
- Website: Official website

Cilleruelo de San Mamés is a municipality located in the province of Segovia, Castile and León, Spain. According to the 2004 census (INE), the municipality had a population of 46 inhabitants.
