= Cubillo =

- Municipality
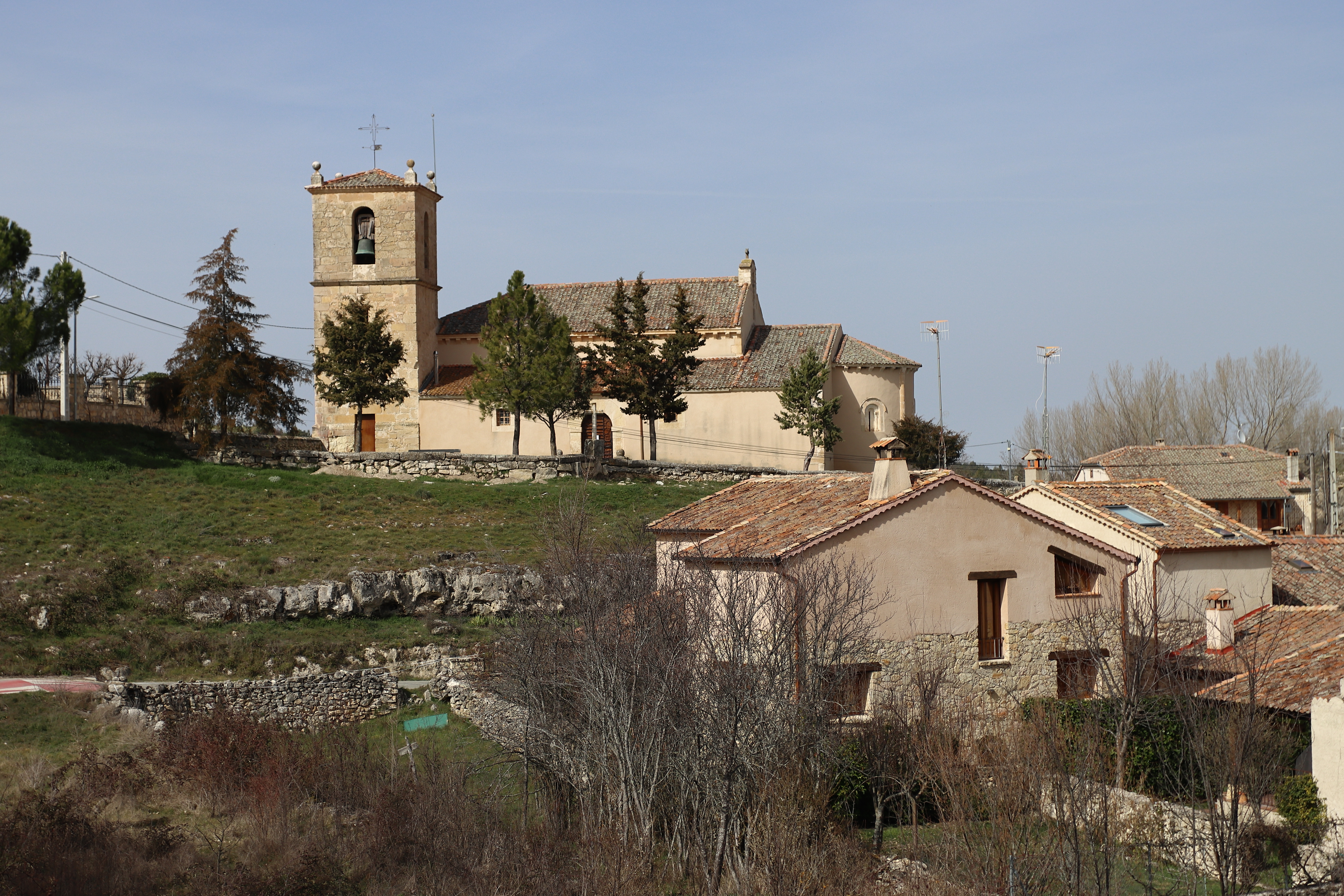
- Cubillo, Church of San Juan

- Location in Spain. Cubillo (Spain)
- Coordinates: 41°07′17″N 3°54′31″W
- Country: Spain
- Autonomous community: Castile and León
- Province: Segovia
- Municipality: Cubillo

Area
  - Total: 20 km^{2} (7.7 sq mi)

Population (2025-01-01)
  - Total: 74
  - Density: 3.7/km^{2} (9.6/sq mi)
- Time zone: UTC+1 (CET)
  - Summer (DST): UTC+2 (CEST)
- Website: Official website

Cubillo is a municipality located in the province of Segovia, Castile and León, Spain. According to the 2004 census (INE), the municipality has a population of 118
