= Bercial =

- Municipality
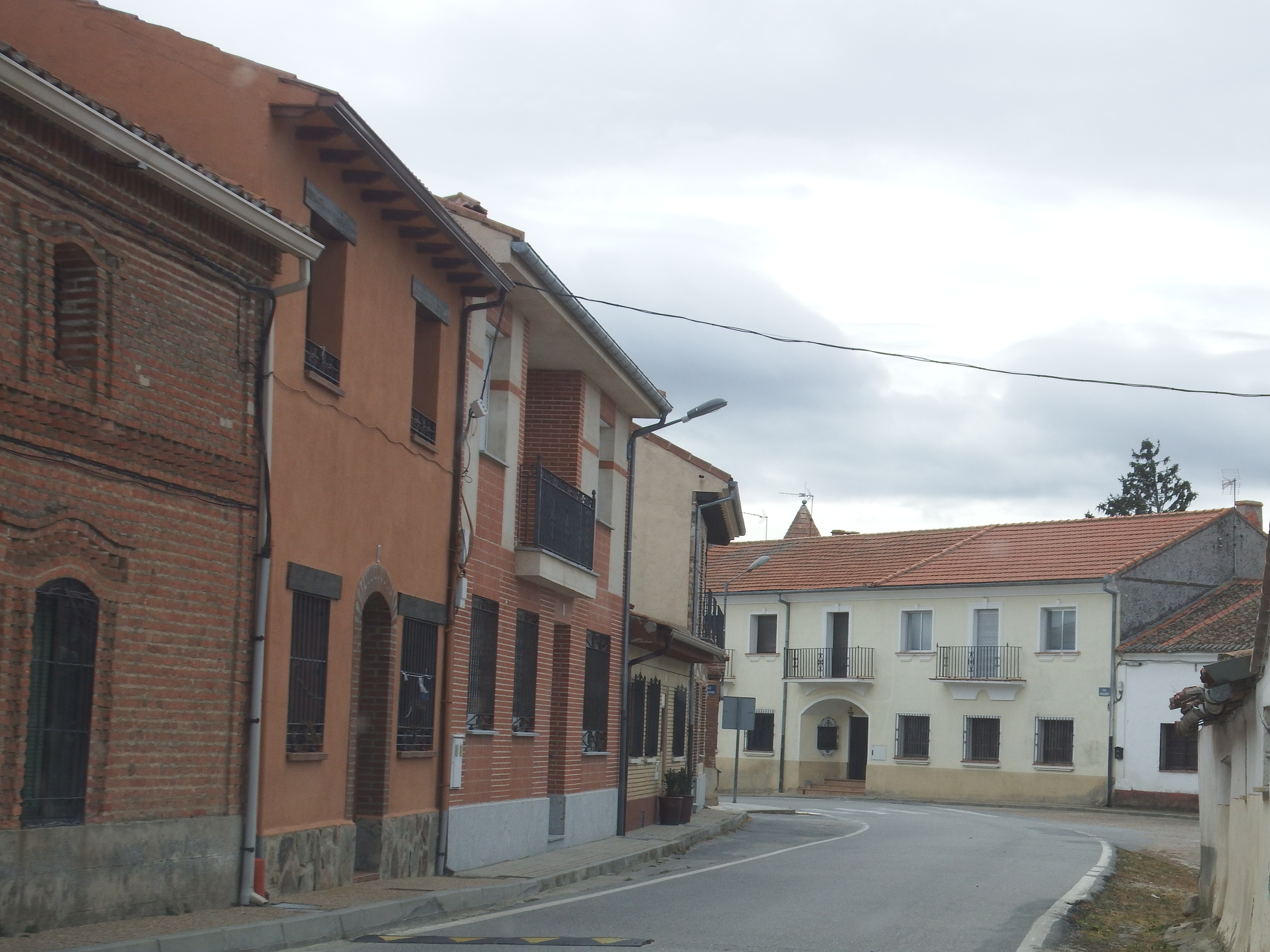
- Street of Bercial Town

- Location in Spain. Bercial (Spain)
- Coordinates: 40°54′22″N 4°26′11″W
- Country: Spain
- Autonomous community: Castile and León
- Province: Segovia
- Municipality: Bercial

Area
  - Total: 20.83 km^{2} (8.04 sq mi)
- Elevation: 971 m (3,186 ft)

Population (2025-01-01)
  - Total: 102
  - Density: 4.90/km^{2} (12.7/sq mi)
- Time zone: UTC+1 (CET)
  - Summer (DST): UTC+2 (CEST)
- Website: Official website

Bercial is a municipality located in the province of Segovia, Castile and León, Spain. According to the 2004 census (INE), the municipality had a population of 119 inhabitants.
