= Moral de Hornuez =

- Municipality
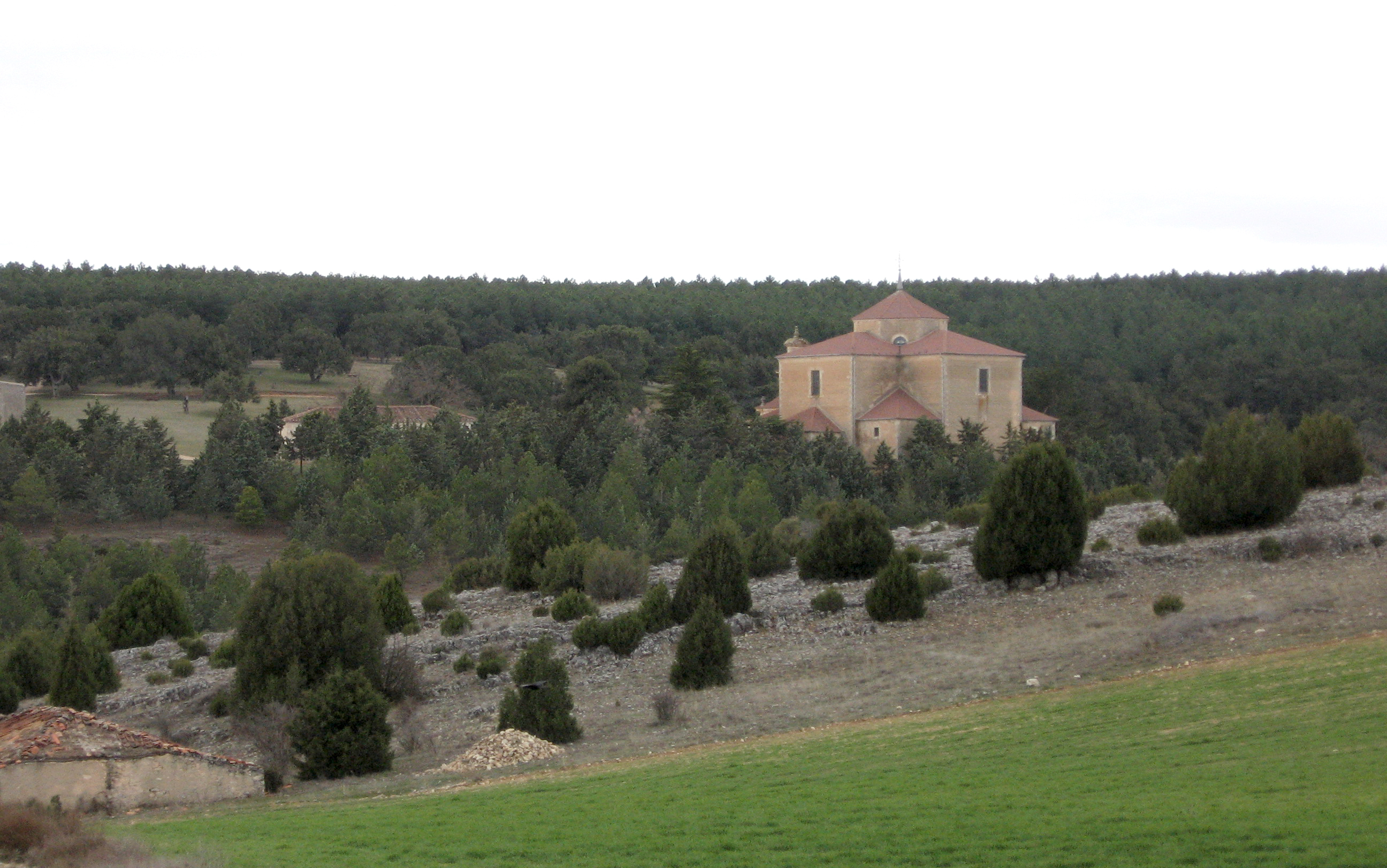
- Sanctuary of the Virgin of the Miracle.

- Location in Spain. Moral de Hornuez (Spain)
- Coordinates: 41°27′52″N 3°37′00″W
- Country: Spain
- Autonomous community: Castile and León
- Province: Segovia
- Municipality: Moral de Hornuez

Area
  - Total: 32 km^{2} (12 sq mi)

Population (2025-01-01)
  - Total: 38
  - Density: 1.2/km^{2} (3.1/sq mi)
- Time zone: UTC+1 (CET)
  - Summer (DST): UTC+2 (CEST)
- Website: Official website

Moral de Hornuez is a municipality located in the province of Segovia, Castile and León, Spain. According to the 2004 census (INE), the municipality has a population of 93 inhabitants.
