= Garcillán =

- Municipality
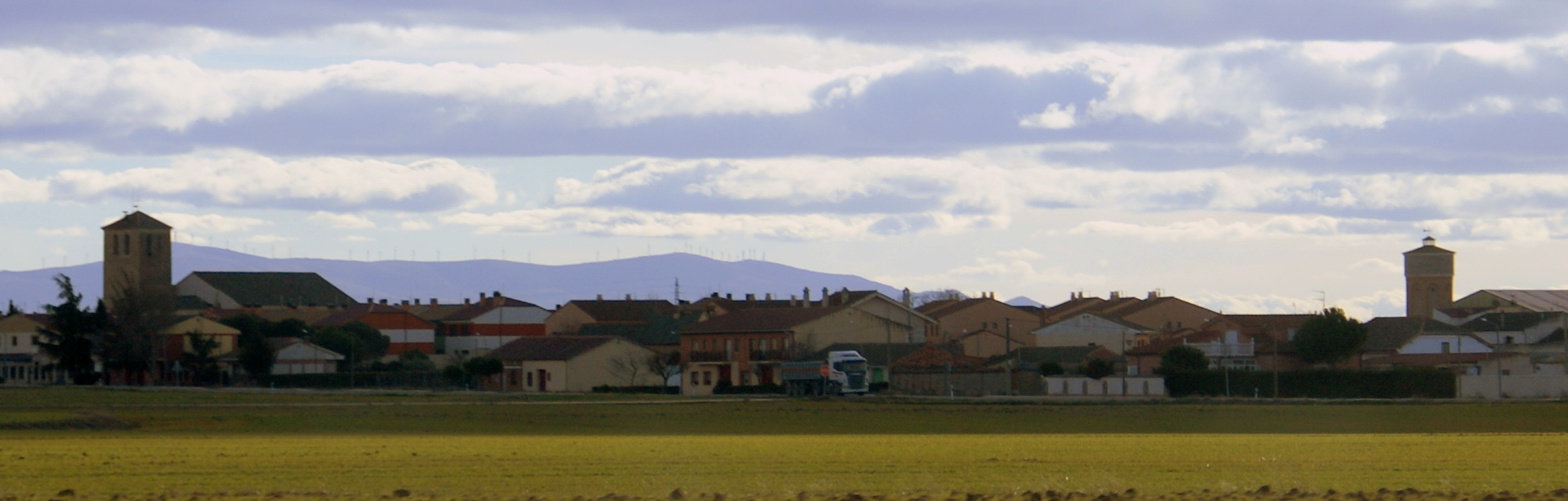

- Location in Spain. Garcillán (Spain)
- Coordinates: 40°58′41″N 4°15′58″W
- Country: Spain
- Autonomous community: Castile and León
- Province: Segovia
- Municipality: Garcillán

Area
  - Total: 22 km^{2} (8.5 sq mi)

Population (2025-01-01)
  - Total: 513
  - Density: 23/km^{2} (60/sq mi)
- Time zone: UTC+1 (CET)
  - Summer (DST): UTC+2 (CEST)
- Website: Official website

Garcillán is a municipality located in the province of Segovia, Castile and León, Spain. According to the 2004 census (INE), the municipality has a population of 372 inhabitants.
