= Ituero y Lama =

- Municipality
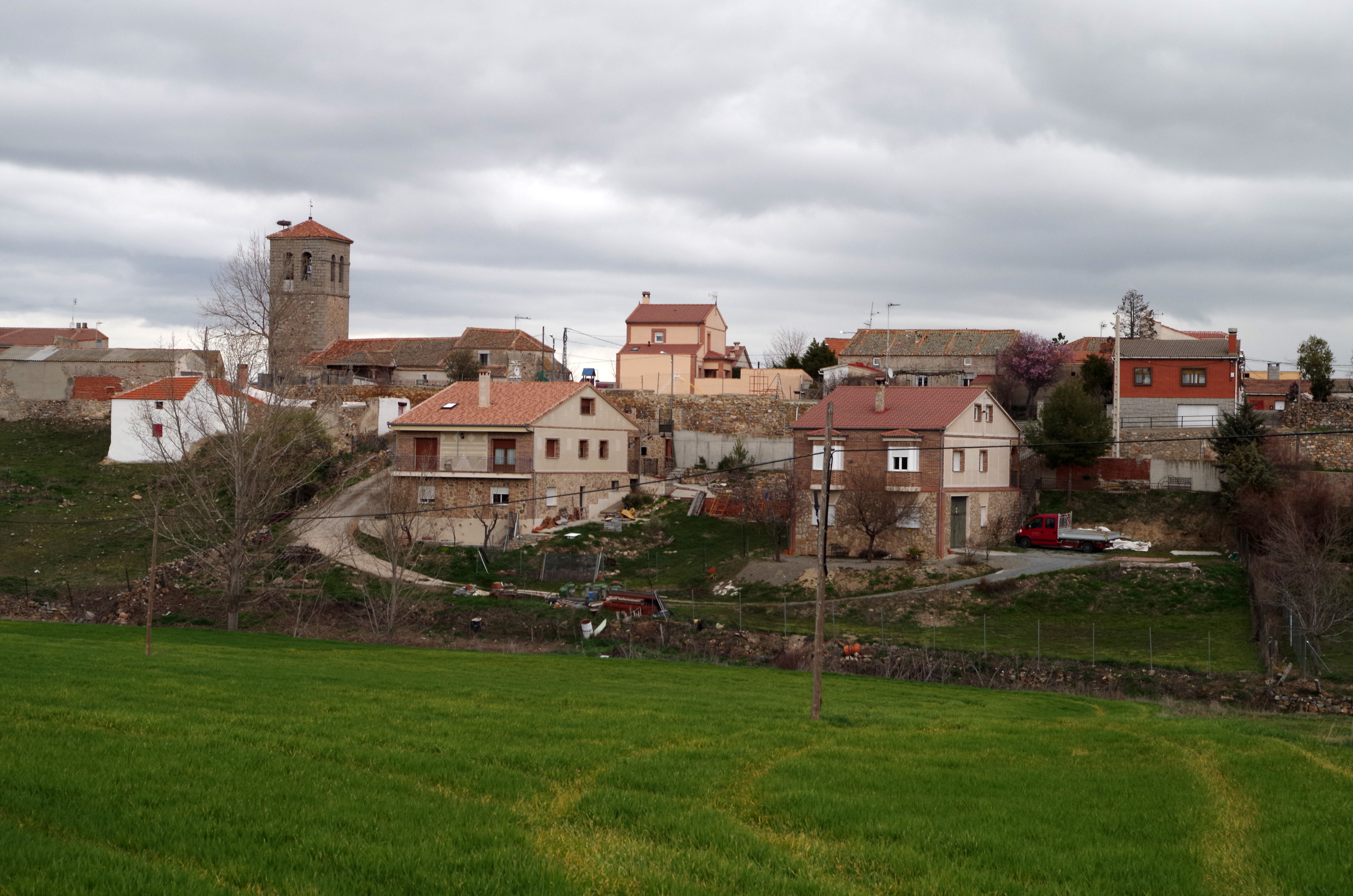

- Flag Coat of arms

- Location in Spain. Ituero y Lama (Spain)
- Coordinates: 40°48′02″N 4°22′42″W
- Country: Spain
- Autonomous community: Castile and León
- Province: Segovia
- Municipality: Ituero y Lama

Area
  - Total: 13 km^{2} (5.0 sq mi)

Population (2025-01-01)
  - Total: 492
  - Density: 38/km^{2} (98/sq mi)
- Time zone: UTC+1 (CET)
  - Summer (DST): UTC+2 (CEST)
- Website: Official website

Ituero y Lama is a municipality located in the province of Segovia, Castile and León, Spain. According to the 2018 census (INE), the municipality has a population of 365.
