= Arcones =

- Municipality
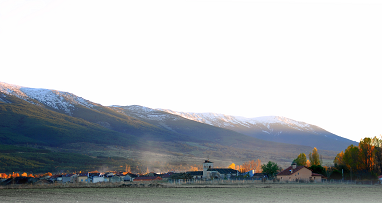
- Panoramic view of Arcones

- Flag Coat of arms

- Location in Spain. Arcones (Spain)
- Coordinates: 41°07′07″N 3°43′27″W
- Country: Spain
- Autonomous community: Castile and León
- Province: Segovia
- Municipality: Arcones

Area
  - Total: 31.75 km^{2} (12.26 sq mi)
- Elevation: 1,151 m (3,776 ft)

Population (2025-01-01)
  - Total: 179
  - Density: 5.64/km^{2} (14.6/sq mi)
- Time zone: UTC+1 (CET)
  - Summer (DST): UTC+2 (CEST)
- Website: Official website

Arcones is a municipality located in the province of Segovia, Castile and León, Spain. According to the 2004 census (INE), the municipality had a population of 260 inhabitants.
