= Juarros de Riomoros =

- Municipality
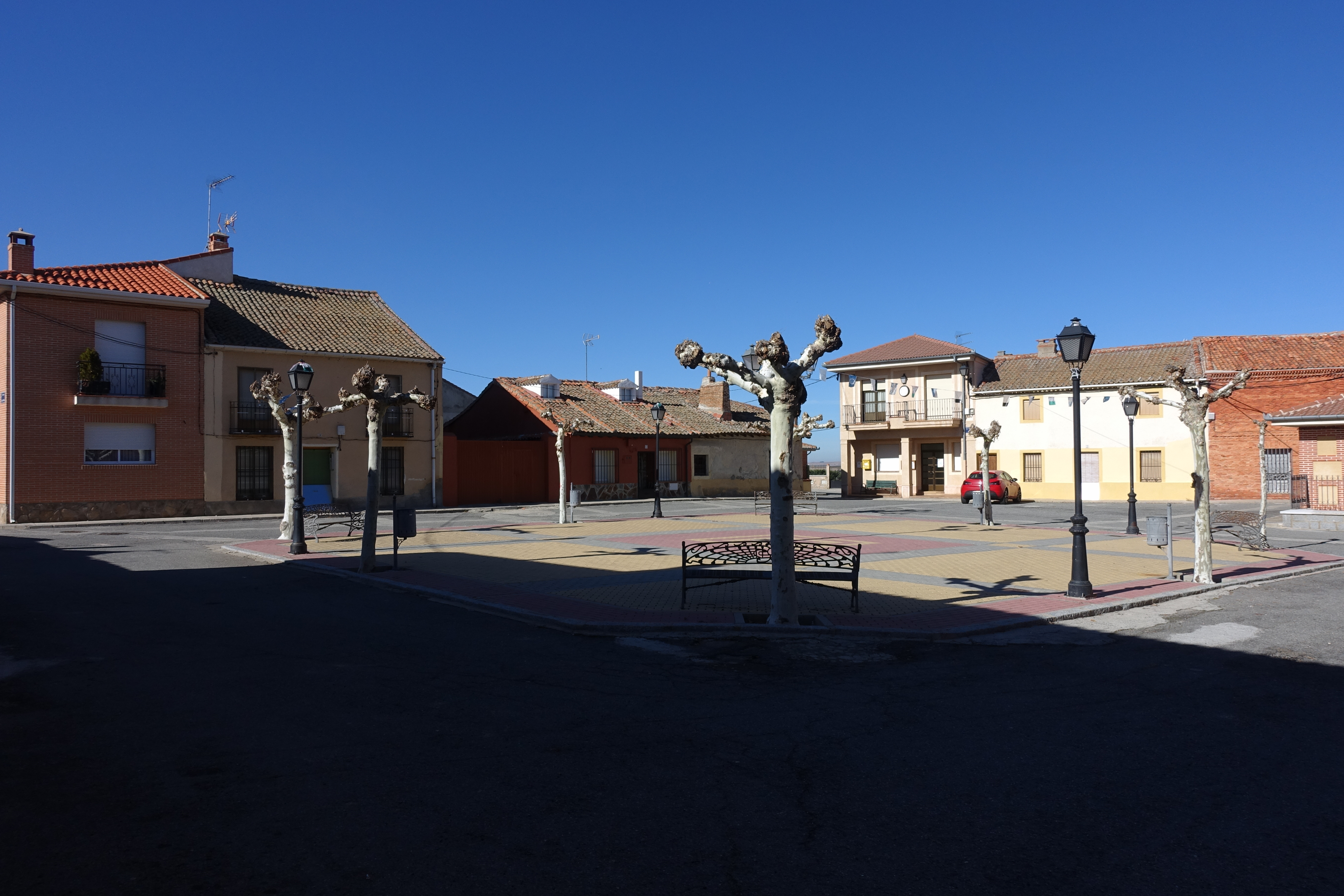
- Plaza Mayor, Juarros de Riomoros

- Location in Spain. Juarros de Riomoros (Spain)
- Coordinates: 40°56′46″N 4°18′31″W
- Country: Spain
- Autonomous community: Castile and León
- Province: Segovia
- Municipality: Juarros de Riomoros

Area
  - Total: 14 km^{2} (5.4 sq mi)

Population (2025-01-01)
  - Total: 53
  - Density: 3.8/km^{2} (9.8/sq mi)
- Time zone: UTC+1 (CET)
  - Summer (DST): UTC+2 (CEST)
- Website: Official website

Juarros de Riomoros is a municipality located in the province of Segovia, Castile and León, Spain. According to the 2004 census (INE), the municipality has a population of 73 inhabitants.
