= Pajarejos =

- Municipality
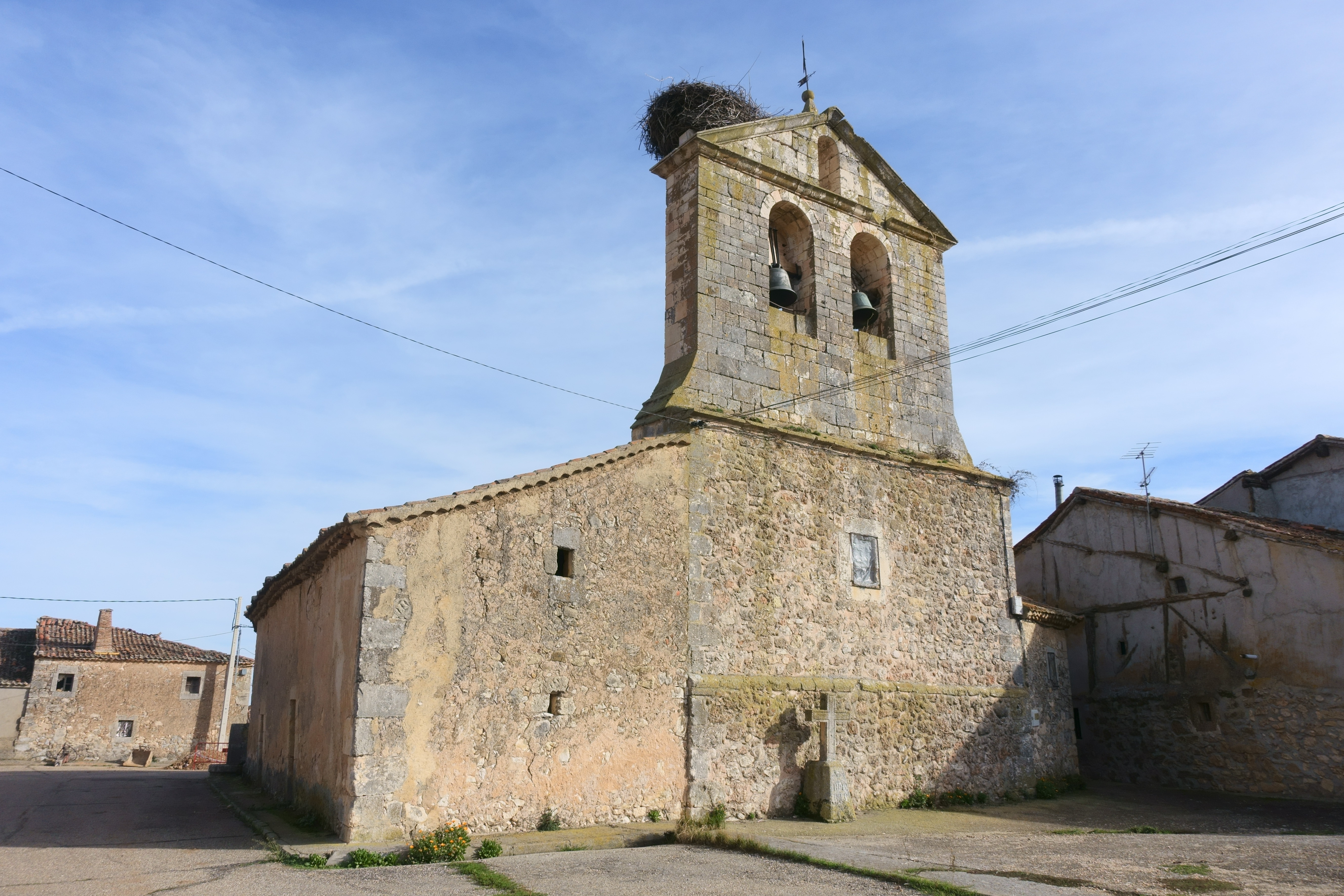
- Church of Santo Domingo de Guzmán, Pajarejos (Segovia, Spain).

- Location in Spain Pajarejos (Spain)
- Coordinates: 41°23′25″N 3°35′25″W
- Country: Spain
- Autonomous community: Castile and León
- Province: Segovia
- Municipality: Pajarejos

Area
  - Total: 8 km^{2} (3.1 sq mi)

Population (2025-01-01)
  - Total: 22
  - Density: 2.8/km^{2} (7.1/sq mi)
- Time zone: UTC+1 (CET)
  - Summer (DST): UTC+2 (CEST)
- Website: Official website

Pajarejos is a municipality located in the province of Segovia, Castile and León, Spain. According to the 2004 census (INE), the municipality has a population of 39 inhabitants.
