= Matabuena =

- Municipality
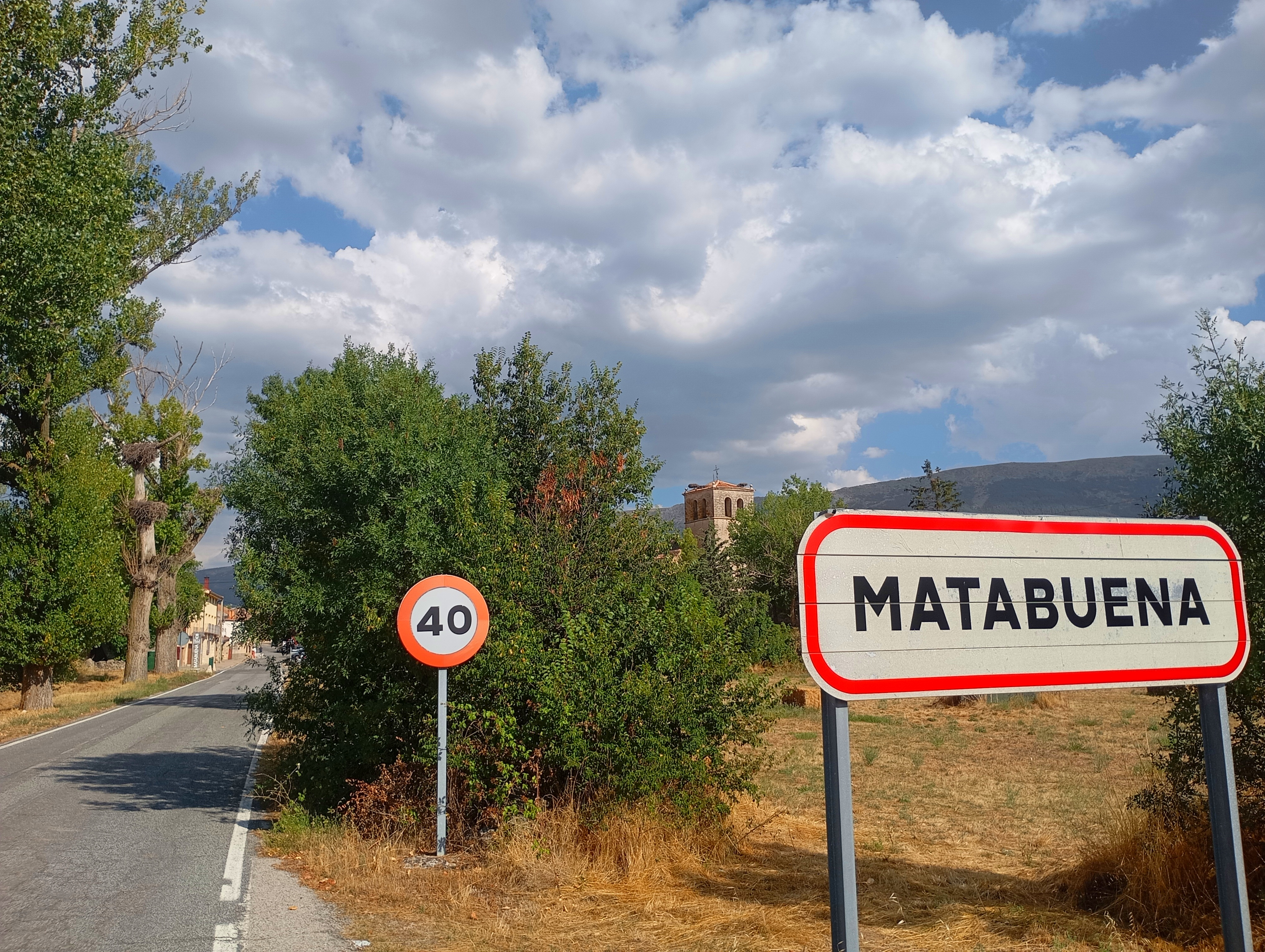

- Location in Spain. Matabuena (Spain)
- Coordinates: 41°05′45″N 3°45′26″W
- Country: Spain
- Autonomous community: Castile and León
- Province: Segovia
- Municipality: Matabuena

Area
  - Total: 21 km^{2} (8.1 sq mi)

Population (2025-01-01)
  - Total: 204
  - Density: 9.7/km^{2} (25/sq mi)
- Time zone: UTC+1 (CET)
  - Summer (DST): UTC+2 (CEST)
- Website: Official website

Matabuena is a municipality located in the province of Segovia, Castile and León, Spain. According to the 2004 census (INE), the municipality has a population of 224 inhabitants.

== History ==
Matabuena is a medieval village, which was called Mata Buena, which is to say it was a land rich in timber and good oak, Matamala neighborhood precisely the opposite, much ash (tree of poor quality).

Matabuena is one of the villages of the town of Pedraza.
