= Calabazas de Fuentidueña =

- Municipality
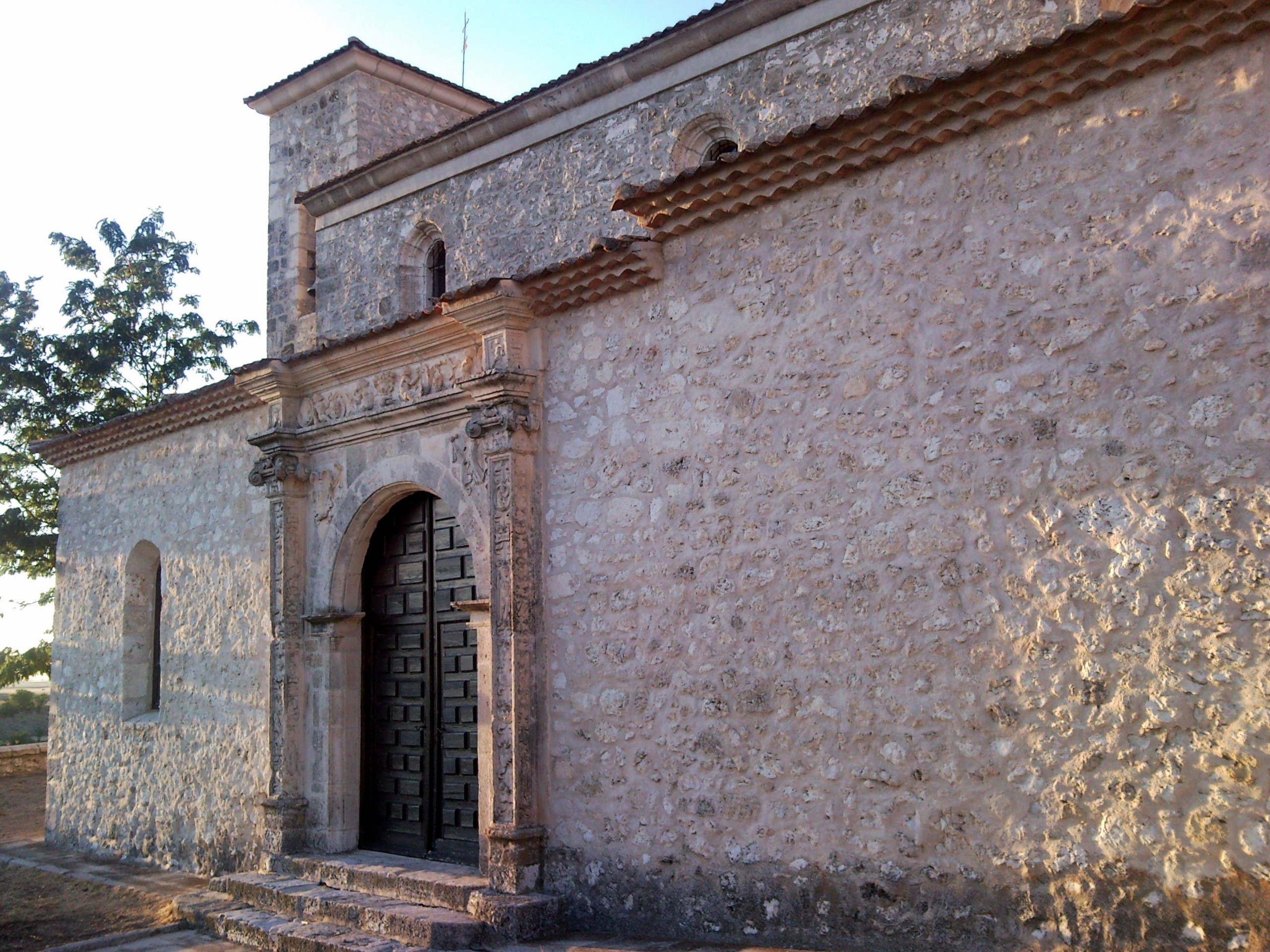
- Church of Calabazas de Fuentidueña, Segovia, Spain

- Location in Spain. Calabazas de Fuentidueña (Spain)
- Coordinates: 41°26′44″N 4°00′37″W
- Country: Spain
- Autonomous community: Castile and León
- Province: Segovia
- Municipality: Calabazas de Fuentidueña

Area
  - Total: 14.90 km^{2} (5.75 sq mi)
- Elevation: 924 m (3,031 ft)

Population (2025-01-01)
  - Total: 23
  - Density: 1.5/km^{2} (4.0/sq mi)
- Time zone: UTC+1 (CET)
  - Summer (DST): UTC+2 (CEST)
- Website: Official website

Calabazas de Fuentidueña is a municipality located in the province of Segovia, Castile and León, Spain. According to the 2004 census (INE), the municipality had a population of 61 inhabitants.
