= Fuentepelayo =

- Municipality
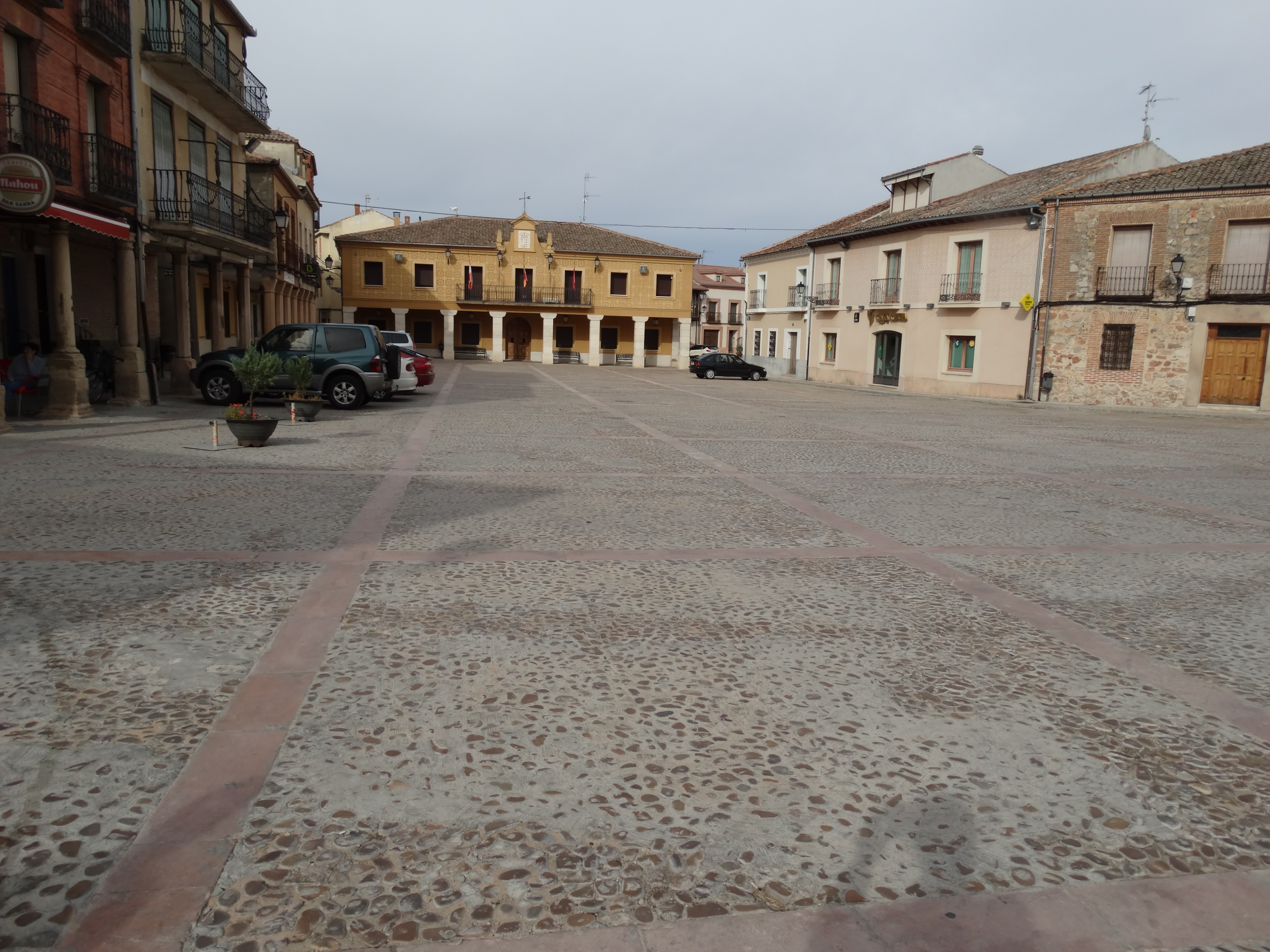

- Flag Coat of arms

- Location in Spain. Fuentepelayo (Spain)
- Coordinates: 41°13′18″N 4°10′33″W
- Country: Spain
- Autonomous community: Castile and León
- Province: Segovia

Government
  - Mayor: Jesús Lorenzo Tejedor de Santos

Area
  - Total: 30 km^{2} (12 sq mi)

Population (2025-01-01)
  - Total: 764
  - Density: 25/km^{2} (66/sq mi)
- Time zone: UTC+1 (CET)
  - Summer (DST): UTC+2 (CEST)
- Website: Official website

Fuentepelayo is a municipality located in the province of Segovia, Castile and León, Spain. According to the 2004 census (INE), the municipality has a population of 975 inhabitants.
