= Cuéllar =

Municipality in Segovia, Castile and León, Spain

- Town and Municipality
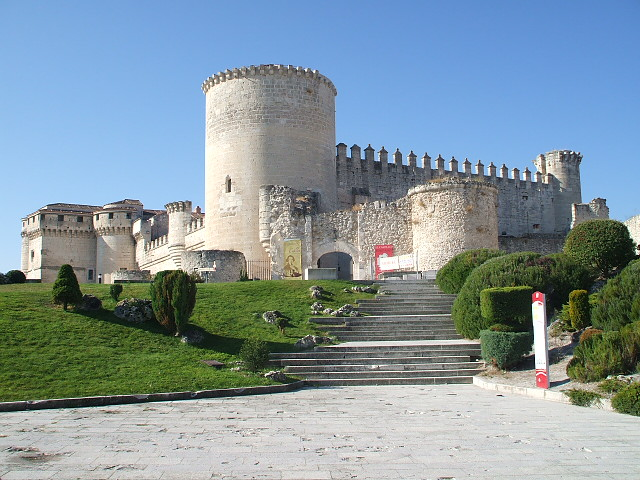
- Castle of Cuéllar

- Flag Coat of arms

- Location in Spain. Cuéllar (Spain)
- Coordinates: 41°24′03″N 4°18′49″W
- Country: Spain
- Autonomous community: Castile and León
- Province: Segovia
- Municipality: Cuéllar
- Elevation: 858 m (2,815 ft)

Population (2025)
  - Total: 9,730
  - Density: 27.89/km^{2} (72.2/sq mi)
- Website: Official website

Cuéllar (Spanish pronunciation: [ˈkweʎaɾ]) is a municipality in the Province of Segovia, within the autonomous community of Castile and León, Spain.

The municipality had a population of 9,730 inhabitants according to the municipal register of inhabitants (INE) as of 1 January 2010, divided into 4,929 men and 4,801 women.

Cuéllar is located on a hill and is 60 km northeast of the capital city of Segovia and 50 km south of Valladolid. It occupies an area of 272 square kilometres (105 sq mi), and it is 857 metres (2,812 ft) above sea level. The Cerquilla and Cega rivers flow near the town. To the north, the town borders the municipality of Bahabón (the province of Valladolid); to the south, it borders Sanchonuño; to the east is Frumales, and to the west are San Cristóbal de Cuéllar and Vallelado.

Inhabitants of Cuéllar traditionally grow different crops (such as cereals, vegetables, chicory, legumes, and beets) and raise livestock, including pigs, sheep, and cows. Forestry and resin production were once important economic resources.

== History ==
=== Medieval age ===
Professor Ubieto Arteta reported that there is some historical evidence of Cuéllar's existence in the 10th century. Al-Mansur Ibn Abi Aamir (Spanish name: Almanzor) sacked the town and enslaved and deported its citizens to Andalusia. King Alfonso VI of León and Castile rebuilt the town, bringing in new settlers at the end of the 11th century. This was the origin of the municipality, which was ruled by its town council. In 1184, King Alfonso VIII of Castile assembled the parliament in Cuéllar.

In the 13th century, Cuéllar was one of the most important towns in northern Spain, and the wool trade enriched the local economy. Many palaces and Mudéjar churches were constructed during this period. In 1256, Alfonso X of Castile granted Cuéllar a royal fuero. Queen María de Molina, Sancho IV of Castile's wife, inherited the town after her husband's death. During her troubled regency, the town was a refuge while her son, the future King Ferdinand IV of Castile, was still a child.

In the middle of the 14th century, King Pedro I "the Cruel" married Doña Juana de Castro in Cuéllar. The marriage was a fraud because the King was unlawfully divorced from his former wife and because he deserted Doña Juana after their wedding night.

In 1464, King Henry IV of Castile gave the town as a lordship to his favorite nobleman, Beltrán de La Cueva, the first Duke of Alburquerque. Since then, the town has been bound to this family. The duke's great-grandson was raised as a marquess.

=== Modern age ===
In the 17th century, the town suffered a recession, along with many cities and villages in the country. The monarchy moved to Madrid and settled the royal court within this city, which forced the aristocracy to relocate to Madrid. It was also a period of poverty, due to the decadence of the wool trade, the taxes to pay for prior wars, and the various plagues that ravaged the country.

In the 18th century, laws enacted by Charles III allowed Cuéllar to recover some of its social and economic prosperity.

When Napoleon invaded Spain, Cuéllar was looted by the French troops, who stole all the treasuries from the churches, monasteries, and the castle. They were never recovered.

In 1833, the writer and politician Jose de Espronceda was exiled to Cuéllar because of his liberalism. Espronceda wrote the novel Sancho Saldaña o el Castellano de Cuéllar when he lived near the church of Santo Tomé.

=== 20th century ===
During the Spanish Civil War, the town remained part of the country controlled by nationalist forces, so its churches were preserved from destruction. Cuéllar Castle served as headquarters to the fascist Italian troops, and later as a prison for different political prisoners. Many years after, the castle became a hospital for consumption patients and a jail for criminals. Today it functions as a high school and tourism center. Due to local agricultural production, the people of Cuéllar were affected less after the civil war and did not emigrate as much as other people in the region.

== Geography ==
Cuéllar is located in the heart of the natural region of Tierra de Pinares, on the border of the province of Segovia, where it meets the province of Valladolid, 60 km and 50 km respectively from both capitals. It is bordered to the north by Bahabón, Campaspero, Torrescárcela and Viloria, all in the province of Valladolid; to the west by Chañe, Arroyo de Cuéllar, Samboal, San Cristóbal de Cuéllar and Vallelado; to the south by Gomezserracín, Pinarejos, Samboal, San Martín y Mudrián and Sanchonuño and to the east by Frumales and Olombrada, all in the province of Segovia. Its exact coordinates are 41°24′10″N 4°19′12″E and it is 857.93 m above sea level.

Northwest: San Cristóbal de Cuéllar
North: Viloria (Valladolid), Torrescárcela (Valladolid), Bahabón (Valladolid)
Northeast: Campaspero (Valladolid)
West: Vallelado, Chañe, Samboal

East: Olombrada, Frumales, Hontalbilla, Lastras de Cuéllar
Southwest: San Martín y Mudrián
South: Pinarejos, Gomezserracín, Sanchonuño,
Southeast: Zarzuela del Pinar

Until 2008, its municipal area covered an area of 272.4 km^{2}, but in that year the Junta de Castilla y León recognised the town's ownership of the mountain called Común Grande de las Pegueras, and ruled that it belonged to Cuéllar, increasing the municipality's area by 74.46 km^{2}.

Due to its location in the centre of the northern plateau, it has a gentle topography, except in the large gorge that delimits its municipal area along with the river Cega. From a geological point of view, three zones can be distinguished: a quaternary mass characterised by a sandy terrain with lush vegetation, a Miocenic mass in which the soil is primarily clay, and another belonging to the Pliocene epoch, which is mixed with the previous one.

== Demographics ==
Evolution 1902-2020
Year	Population
1902	4.064
1913	4.177
1930	5.080
1941	7.296
1946	6.354
1951	6.853
1956	6.919
1961	6.770
1966	6.670
1970	6.699
1975	8.845
1981	8.965
1986	9.310
1991	9.071
1996	9.118
2001	9.138
2005	9.483
2007	9.514
2008	9.841
2009	9.861
2010	9.730
2016	9.501
2018	9.584
2020	9.659

The municipality had a population of 9,730 inhabitants according to the municipal register of inhabitants (INE) on 1 January 2010, divided between 4,929 men and 4,801 women. The figure includes the municipal capital, and the neighbourhoods and smaller local entities belonging to the municipality since 1981. The total is divided as follows: Cuéllar (8,374), Arroyo de Cuéllar (381), Chatún (262), Campo de Cuéllar (221), Torregutiérrez (126), Dehesa Mayor (112), Lovingos (96), Escarabajosa de Cuéllar (79), Fuentes de Cuéllar (48) and Dehesa (31). Since long time ago until 2021, it was the municipality with the largest number of inhabitants in the province, with the exception of the capital. However, from 2022 onwards, it was overtaken by El Espinar.

=== History ===
The demographic history of Cuéllar was influenced by the discovery of America in the 15th century, due to the large number of cuellaranos (demonym for the inhabitants of Cuéllar) who travelled to the new lands and changed the demographic course of the town. It could not be reliably studied until the year 1528 when the first complete population census appeared. By the end of the 16th century Cuéllar's population totalled around 3,000, attributed to a growth derived from the new economy, which was mainly devoted to agriculture to the detriment of livestock farming, and from becoming a migratory enclave for nearby towns that sought the tax advantages offered by the town to foreigners.

At the beginning of the 17th century, there was a significant decline at the end of the 16th century, when the population of Cuéllar dropped to 2,400 inhabitants; in 1751, it had 2,194 inhabitants. The recovery of the kingdom in the 18th century and the commercial and economic importance of the town again allowed for immigration, reaching 3,000 inhabitants in the mid-19th century. In the 20th century, one of the greatest population growths was recorded between 1930 and 1940, with more than 2,000 inhabitants, as well as in the period between 1970 and 1975, the most fruitful period in the demography of Cuéllar in that century, although this was because it incorporated the disappeared municipalities of Arroyo de Cuéllar, Campo de Cuéllar, Chatún, Dehesa, Fuentes de Cuéllar and Lovingos into its territory in 1971. At the end of the 1980s, the population fell by 300, but began to recover again from the 1990s onwards, rising steadily until the present day. Factors include immigration from the surrounding municipalities and its industries and services, which have made it an economic and commercial centre in the area.

== Notable people from Cuéllar ==
- Diego Velázquez de Cuéllar, Spanish conquistador.
- Bartolomé de la Cueva y Toledo, 16th century Roman Catholic cardinal.
- Juan de Grijalva, Spanish conquistador. Some authors say he originated from the same family as Diego Velázquez.
- Antonio de Herrera y Tordesillas, Spanish historian during the reigns of Philip II, Philip III, and Philip IV.

== Architecture ==
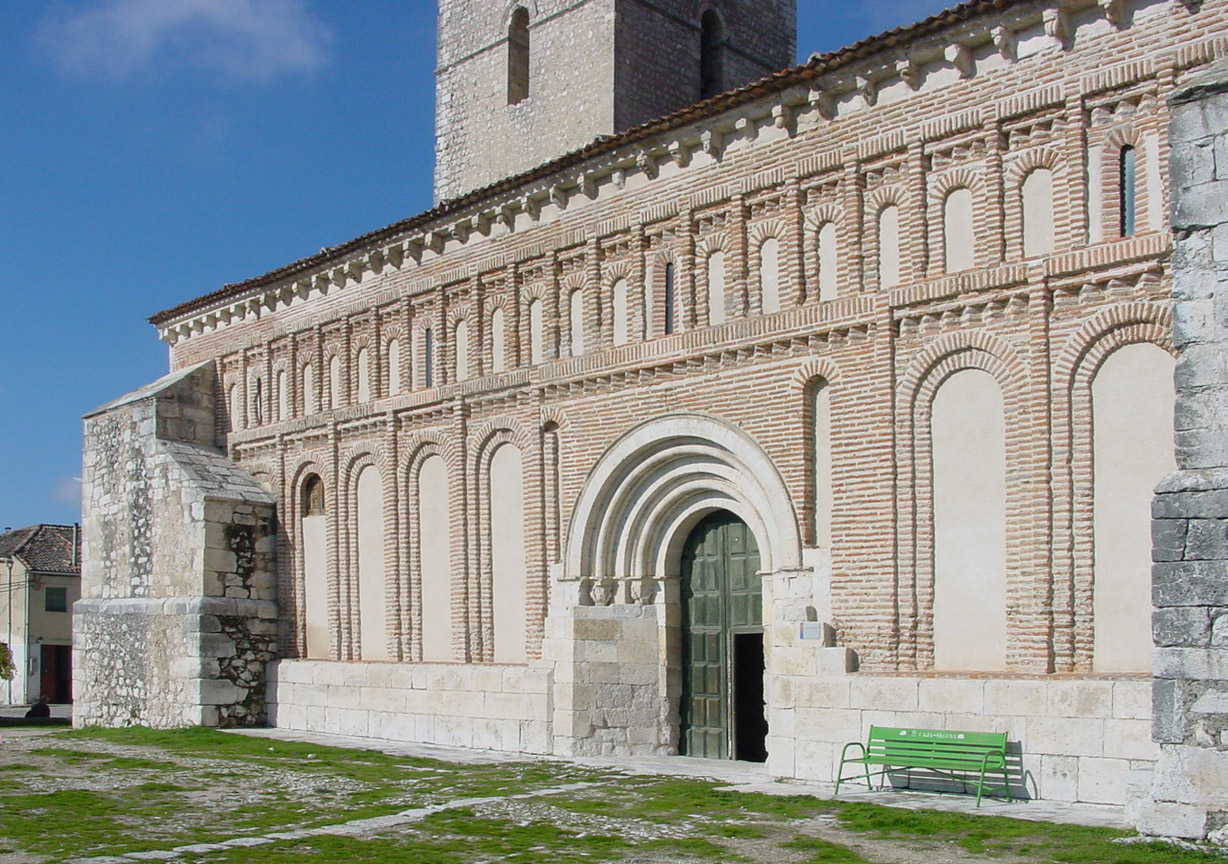
San Andrés Church

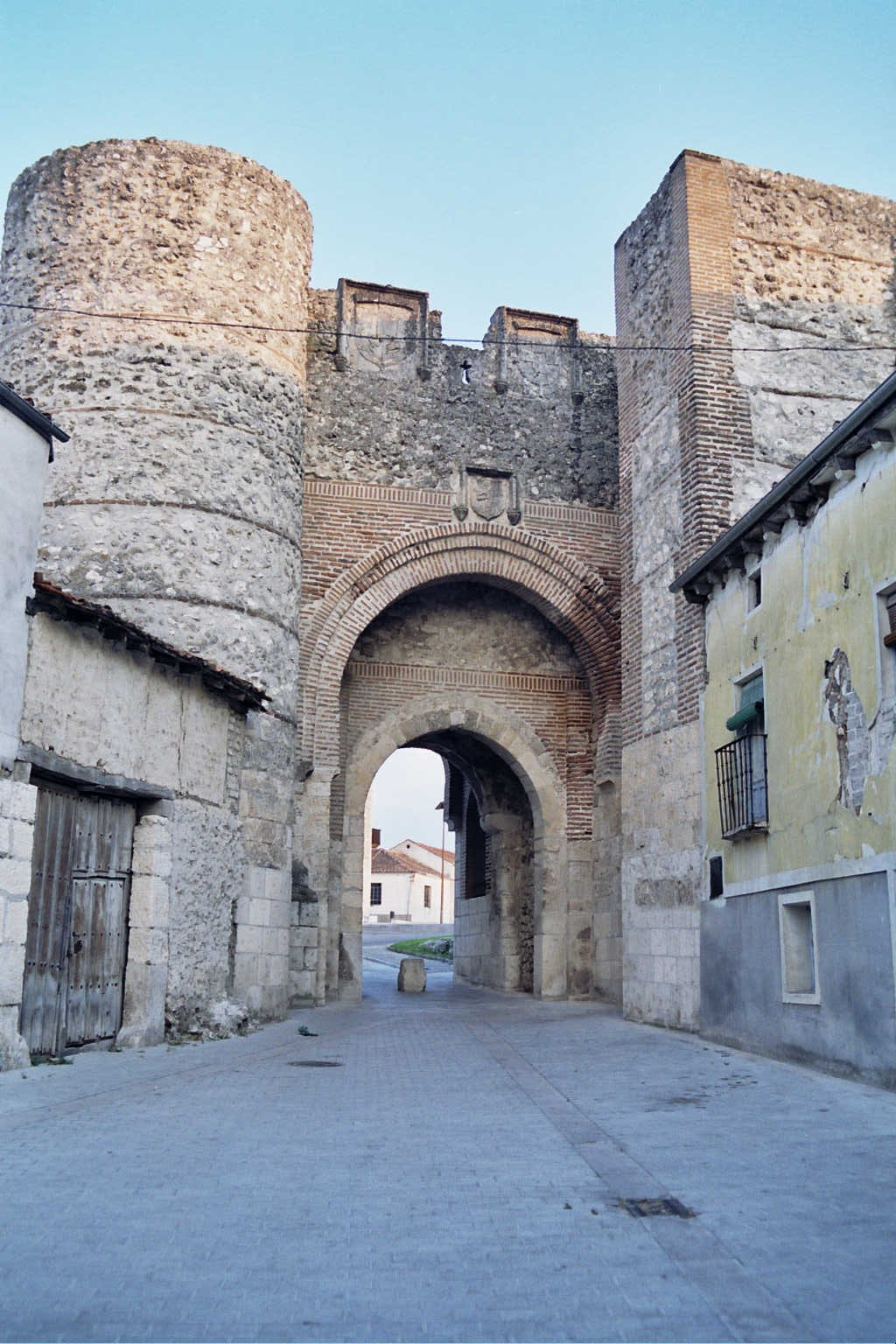
Arch of San Basilio

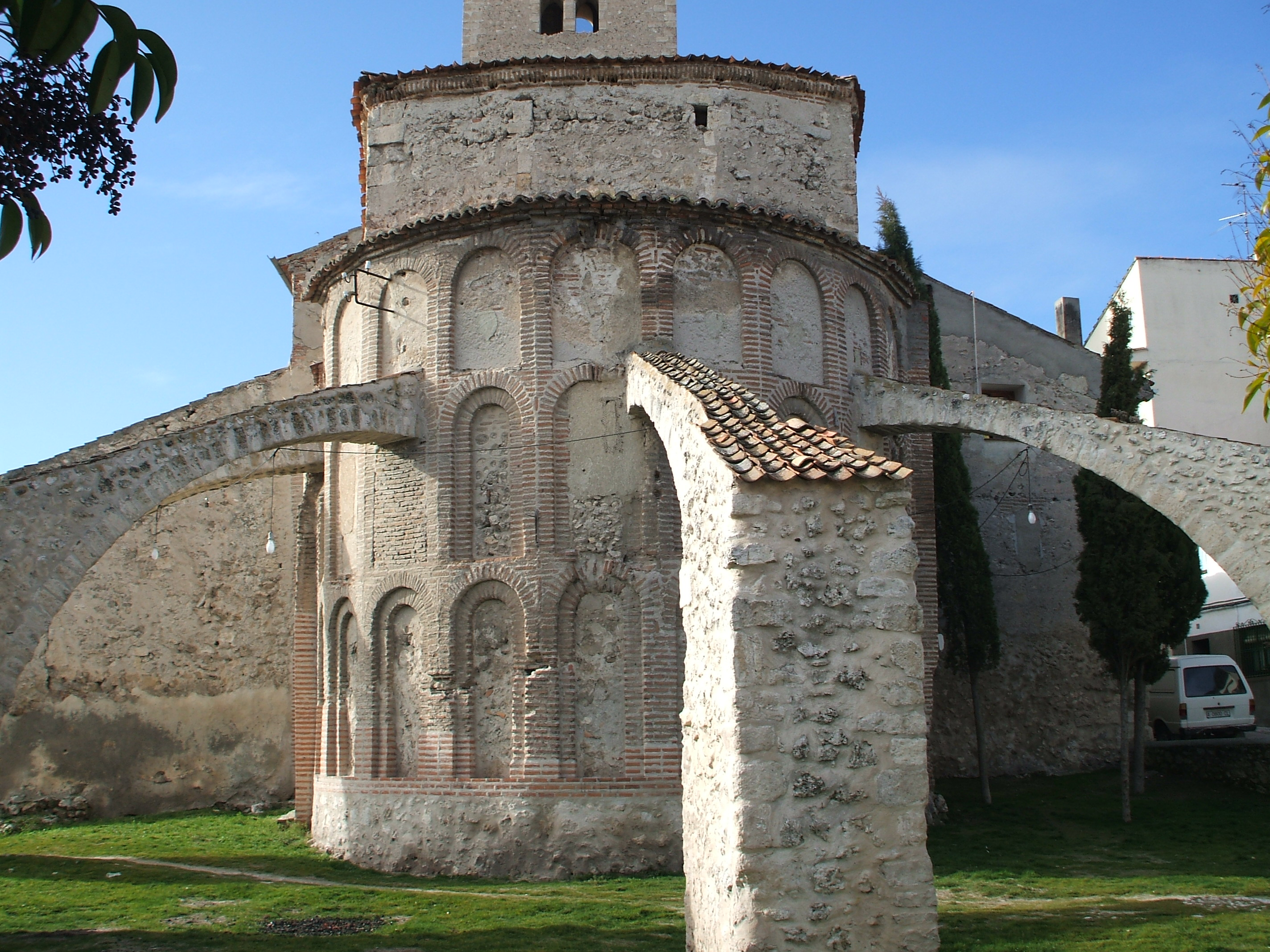
Salvador Church

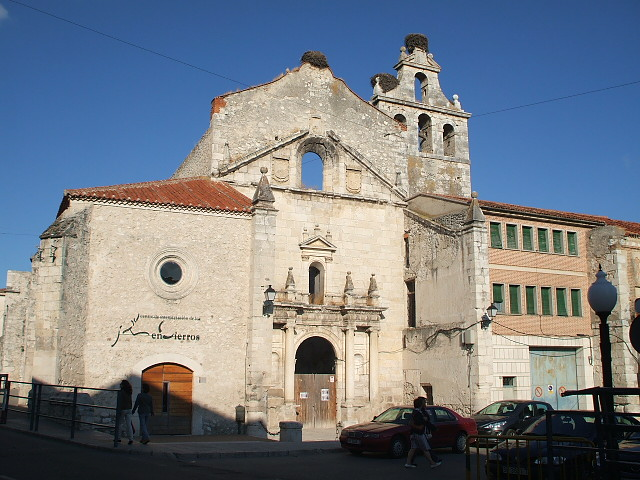
San Francisco Cloister

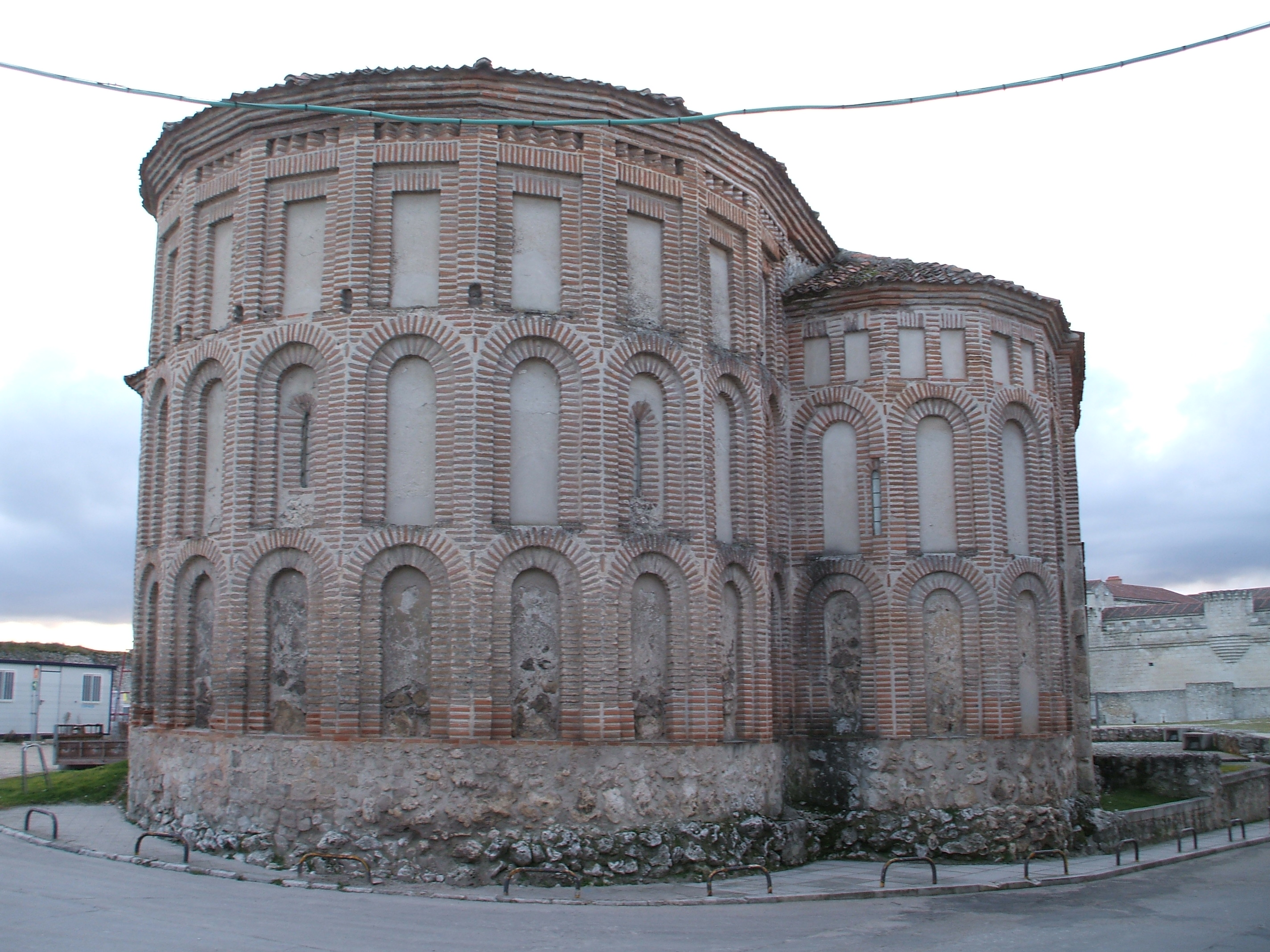
San Martín Church (Cuéllar)

- San Martín Church (Cuéllar) (Iglesia de San Martín): A church built in the Mudéjar style in the 14th century. The church is located near the Dukes of Alburquerque's castle. In 1997, a center for the interpretation of Mudéjar art was opened inside.
- San Andrés Church (Iglesia de San Andrés): There is historical evidence of its existence from 1277. During this period, it stood outside the walls of the town. This church is considered one of the most beautiful Mudéjar churches in Spain.
- San Esteban Church (Iglesia de San Esteban): The church stood between the first and second lines of the town walls. Its existence has been documented since 1247. The church apse is representative of the golden age of the Mudéjar art. An ancient burial ground was discovered next to this church.
- Santiago Church (Iglesia de Santiago): The apse is the only part of this Mudéjar church that has survived. The temple has been documented since 1244. The records of the House of the Town Lineages, founded in the 14th century, were kept here.
- San Pedro Old Church (Antigua Iglesia de San Pedro): The church dates back to 1095, and was built on the south side of the town walls. Its shape appears to be more like a fortress. Some gothic structures remain in its tower and inside the structure. In the 19th century, the church had to be sold by order of the civil government. It was used as a flour factory for many years. Today, the church is owned as private property.
- Walls of Cuéllar: The town walls were built around the 12th century. They were expanded and rebuilt in the 14th and 15th centuries for defense. The town walls are made of stone and lime, with noted arches along with them. The walls have two different parts: one for the ancient citadel and an outer wall. These walls have not remained unbroken because of the growth of the town, but there are several well-preserved sections besides the arches. In 1931, the walls were declared as national heritage sites.
- Dukes of Alburquerque's Castle: The ancient fortress was built before the 11th century, though the current building was built in the 14th and 15th centuries. In 1306, this structure became recognized as a castle and is located on a hilltop. It was restored and is currently used as a high school.
- School of Grammar (Estudio de Gramática): The school was a charity institution founded by Deacon Gómez González in 1424. It is believed that Cardinal Cisneros visited the school, but it is unknown if he was a student or a teacher. A Renaissance façade remains on the structure.
- Pedro I the Cruel's Palace: A gothic palace that was built in the 14th century. In 1353, the king celebrated after marrying Doña Juana de Castro in the San Martin Church.
- Magdalena Hospital: Founded in 1429 by González, this gothic building was a charity hospital.
- San Francisco Park: This attractive park is surrounded by three old cloisters: Santa Isabel o Santa Ana, San Francisco, and The Immaculate Conception. Santa Isabel is expected to be restored, while San Francisco was once the biggest temple in Cuéllar. It once contained the Duke of Alburquerque's tombs (now located in The Hispanic Society of America Museum). This building had to be sold by order of the civil government and suffered a fire later where the building was nearly destroyed. Now the temple is used as a Center for the Running of the Bulls. The Immaculate Conception was built in the Baroque style. Currently, catholic nuns continue living in this religious building.
- El Salvador Church: This church has a Mudéjar apse with a flying buttress, which gives its singular shape.
- Santa Clara Cloister: The church has a renaissance façade and was one of the first gothic temples built in Cuéllar. Catholic nuns have been living here since the 13th century.
- Santa Maria in The Hill Church: Its elegant tower can be viewed from many places.
- Santa Marina Tower: The tower was part of a former Mudéjar church and is constructed of brick.
- Santo Tomé Church: This church is a small gothic shrine.
- San Miguel Church: This church is located in the square of the town hall. It contains a mix of different building styles and has a gothic dome inside. The church houses a sculpture of Our Lady of the Rosary, which is the religious sponsor of the town.
- Convento de la Purísima Concepción.
- The yard in the town hall: This area is a small yard built in renaissance style.

== Festivals ==
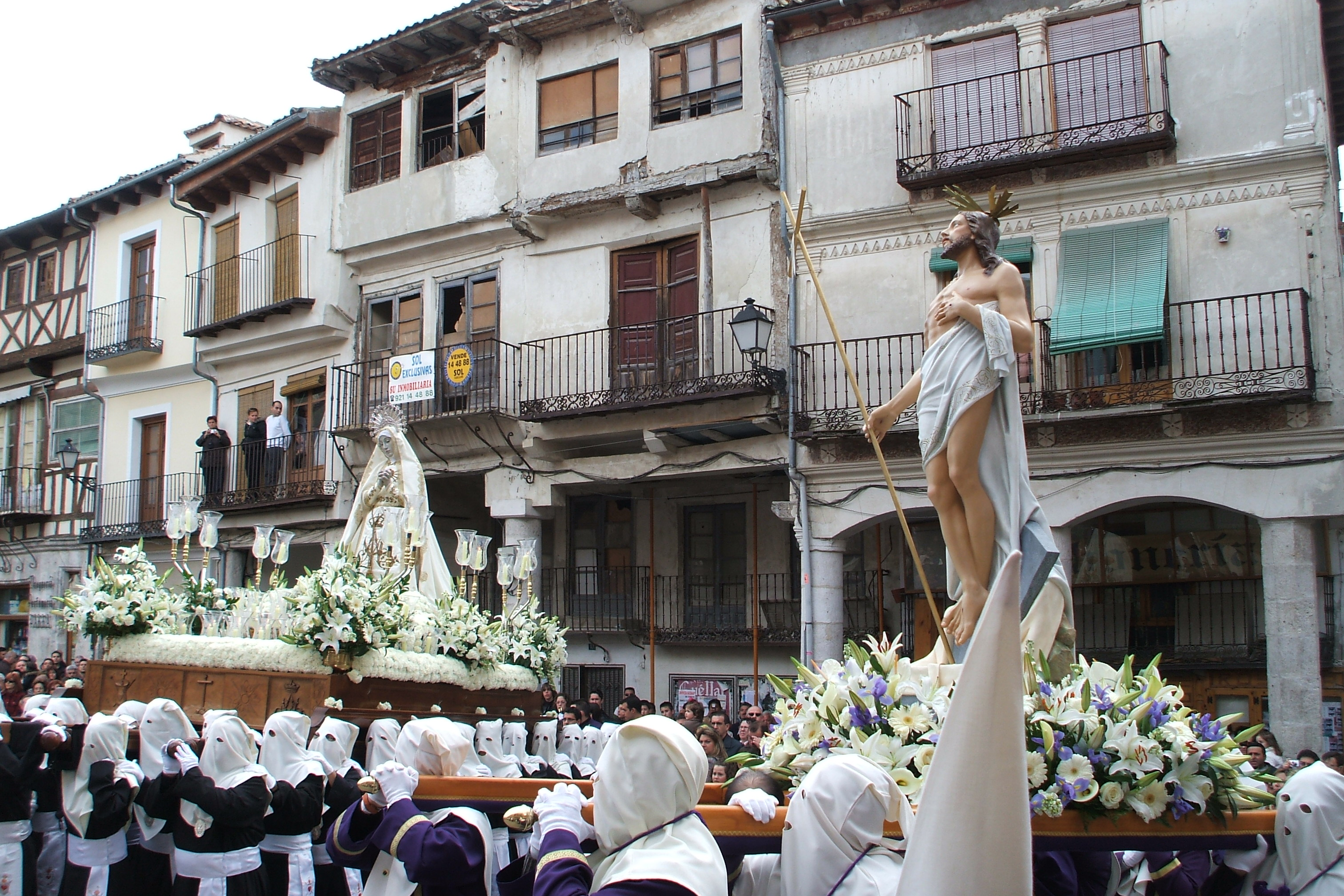
Semana Santa

- Children's Day: The festival is celebrated on New Year's Day and is an old tradition consisting of a procession centered on the Child of The Ball. The child is accompanied by musicians and dancers, and all are dressed in 15th-century clothes. They march through the town and many people join them.
- Running of the Bulls: The festival dates back to 1215 when a request was written to forbid priests to run with the bulls, but it is believed that the pagan tradition started before the introduction of Christianity. The festival runs for five days, beginning on the last Saturday evening of August, and honors Our Lady of the Rosary. Early in the morning, the bulls run from the corral near the river 5 km away to the bull ring. The bulls are guided by horsemen when they are in the pine-forest, and by the people when they arrive in the town. Parties and celebrations join the bull running, and many people come to enjoy the traditional dishes of roasted lamb and the regional wines.
- Annual Pilgrimage to the Sanctuary of Our Lady of the Hayfield (Nuestra Señora del Henar): Every 17 September, devout people from the region come together to pray and celebrate.

== Bibliography ==
- Jiménez Arribas, Javier. Cuéllar. Editorial ÁMBITO, 1999. ISBN 84-8183-055-0
- Catálogo monumental de Castilla y León. Bienes inmuebles declarados. Vol II. Junta de Castilla y León, 1995. ISBN 84-7846-434-4
- Ceballos-Escalera y Gila, Alfonso de. "La Casa de los Ocho Linajes de la Villa y Tierra de Cuéllar", Sociedad Segoviana de Heráldica y Genealogía, Segovia, 1989.
- Herrera Mesón, Jorge. "Velázquez, un apellido originario de Cuéllar", Revista La Villa, Cuéllar, 2006.
- Velasco Bayón, Balbino (1996). Historia de Cuéllar. Caja Segovia (Obra Social y Cultural) (4.ª edición). Segovia: Diputación Provincial de Segovia e Ilmo. Ayuntamiento de Cuéllar. ISBN 84-500-4620-3.
- Rodrigo Criado, Isaías "Cuéllar. Crónicas Municipales de la Ilustre Villa en este siglo: 1900-1994".
