= Cuellar (disambiguation) =

Cuéllar is a town in Spain.

Cuellar or Cuéllar may also refer to:

- Cuellar (surname)

== Places ==
- Buenavista de Cuéllar, a Mexican city
- Buenavista de Cuéllar (municipality), a Mexican municipality
- Fresneda de Cuéllar, a Spanish municipality
- Lastras de Cuéllar, a Spanish municipality
- Mata de Cuéllar, a Spanish municipality
- San Cristóbal de Cuéllar, a Spanish municipality
- Cuéllar Castle, a Spanish castle
