= Campaspero =

- Municipality
- Flag Coat of arms

- Location of Campaspero

- Location in Spain
- Coordinates: 41°29′30″N 4°11′40″W
- Country: Spain
- Autonomous community: Castile and León
- Province: Valladolid
- Comarca: Campo de Peñafiel
- Judicial district: Valladolid
- Commonwealth: Minguela
- Founded: 11th century

Government
  - Alcalde: Julio César García Hernando (2007–2011) (PP)

Area
  - Total: 46.56 km^{2} (17.98 sq mi)
- Elevation: 919 m (3,015 ft)

Population (2025-01-01)
  - Total: 1,001
  - Density: 21.50/km^{2} (55.68/sq mi)
- Demonym: Campasperano/a
- Time zone: UTC+1 (CET)
  - Summer (DST): UTC+2 (CEST)
- Postal code: 47310
- Website: Official website

Campaspero is a Spanish town in the province of Valladolid (Castile and León), next to the borders with the province of Segovia. It is the highest municipality of the province of Valladolid, at more than 900 m over sea level. It belongs to the historical region of Castile, specifically Old Castile.

== History ==
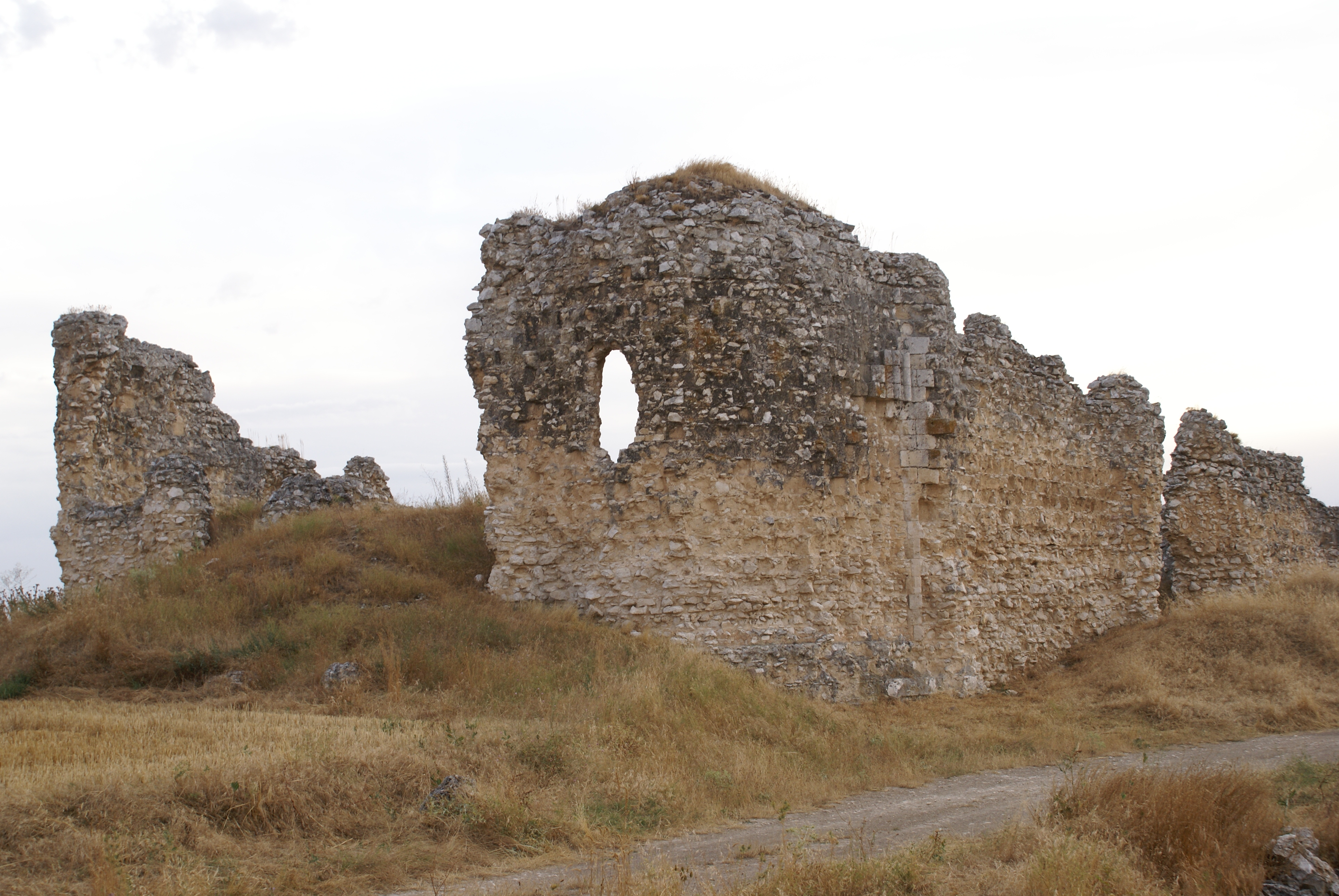
Ruins of Santa María de Oreja convent, built between the 11th and 12th centuries

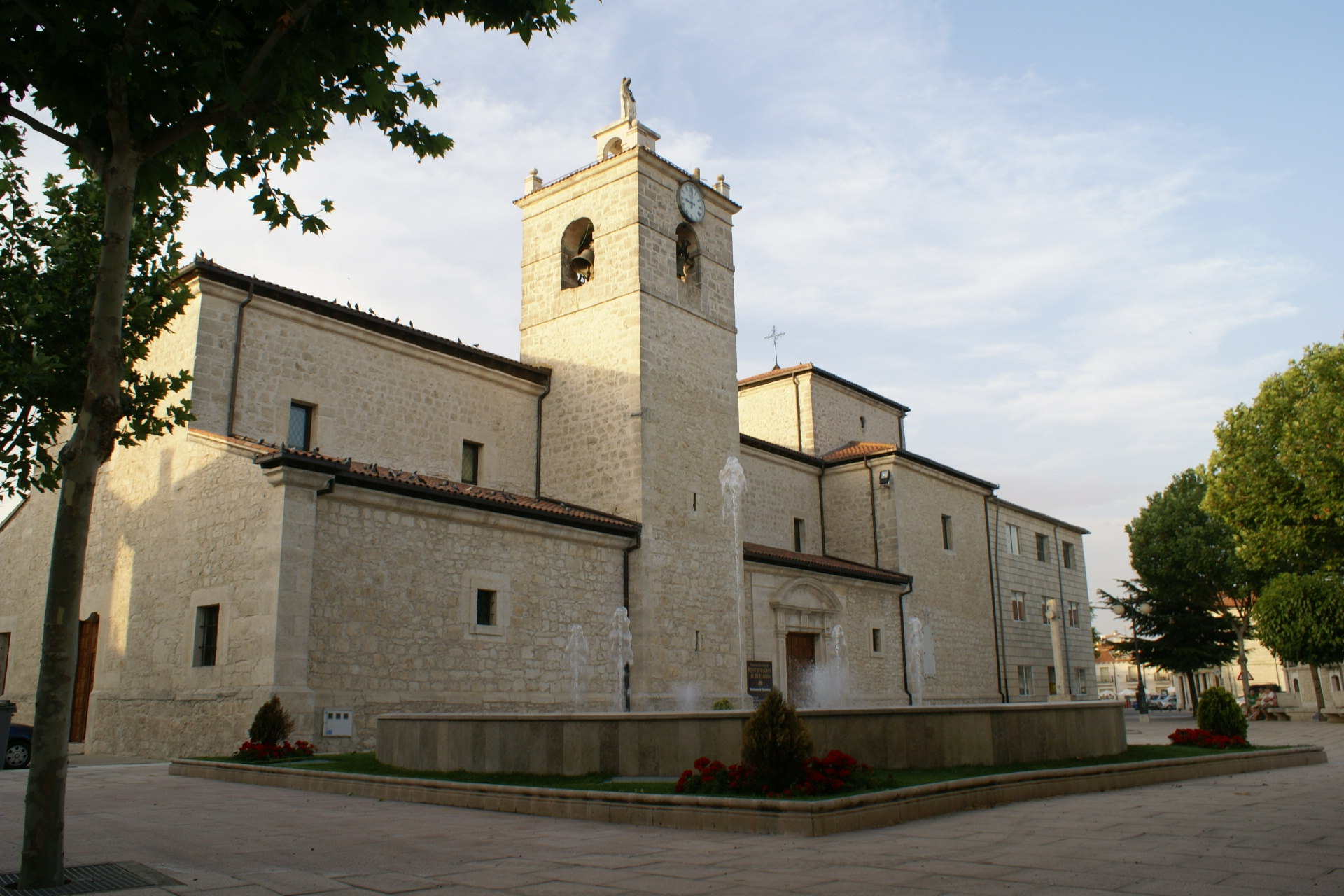
Church of Santo Domingo de Guzmán

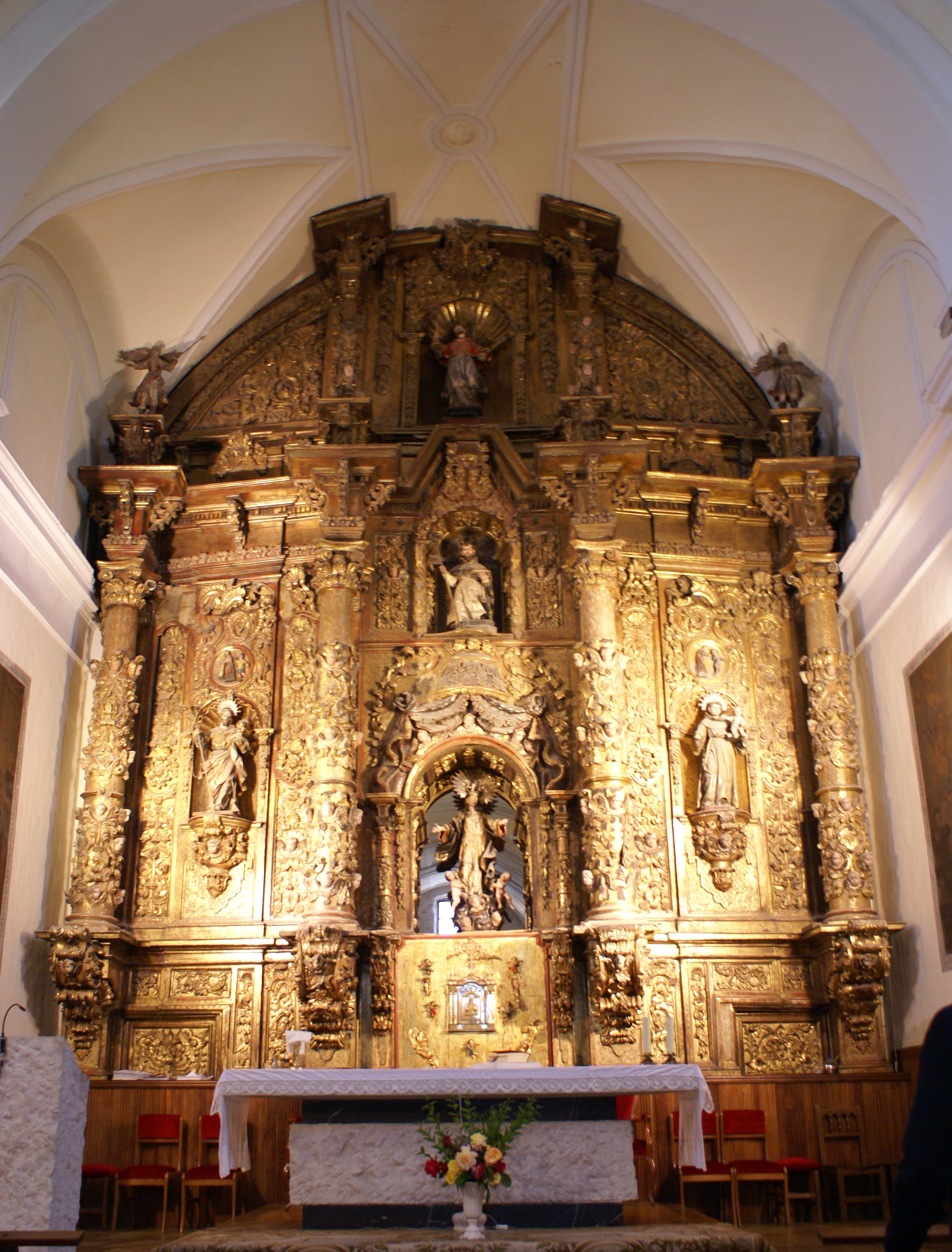
Altarpiece of the Santo Domingo of Guzmán church

There are several theories about the origin of Campaspero's name, a leading one being from the Spanish phrase "Rough Field," which correctly describes the rocky terrain of the area.

Until 1833, the Campaspero belonged to the province of Segovia. It was closely linked to the province of Valladolid because of the proximity to the Comunidad de Villa y Tierra de Peñafiel (Valladolid). In 1833, Campaspero was made a part of Valladolid province.

== Campaspero today ==
Nowadays, Campaspero is the only town in Valladolid's province belonging to the Churrería, a region integrated by Segovian localities, with the sole exception of Campaspero. The parochial church of Guzmán's Santo Domingo is built on stone of its famous quarries. This building dates back to the 18th century, when it was decided to raise this temple due to the condition of ruin of the previous one, which is missing today. The church has a simple structure, and keeps within some carvings of notable interest, as that of the Ascension, made by Pedro Berrugete, a sculptor from the neighbour town of Peñafiel, in the second half of the 18th century.

The images of Santo Domingo of Guzmán (the church's patron saint) and San Buenaventura were carved in the same century. They share the major altarpiece with that of the Ascension. They also share the Baroque style, and were carved in wood for Pedro Ventosa, an artist from Sepúlveda (Segovia). On the left of the presbytery stands out a sculpture of Christ Crucificado, built in the endings of the 16th century. It was surely carved in Cuéllar by Roque Muñoz. In the side of the Epistle an altarpiece of dressing shows an image of the Virgin of the Rosario.

== Quarries ==
Campaspero sits on a seam of stone 30 meters thick, which the townspeople have used since they settled there. The stone of its quarries has long been an important source of work for the village.

Many buildings of the province were built with Campaspero's stone.
