= Samboal =

- Municipality
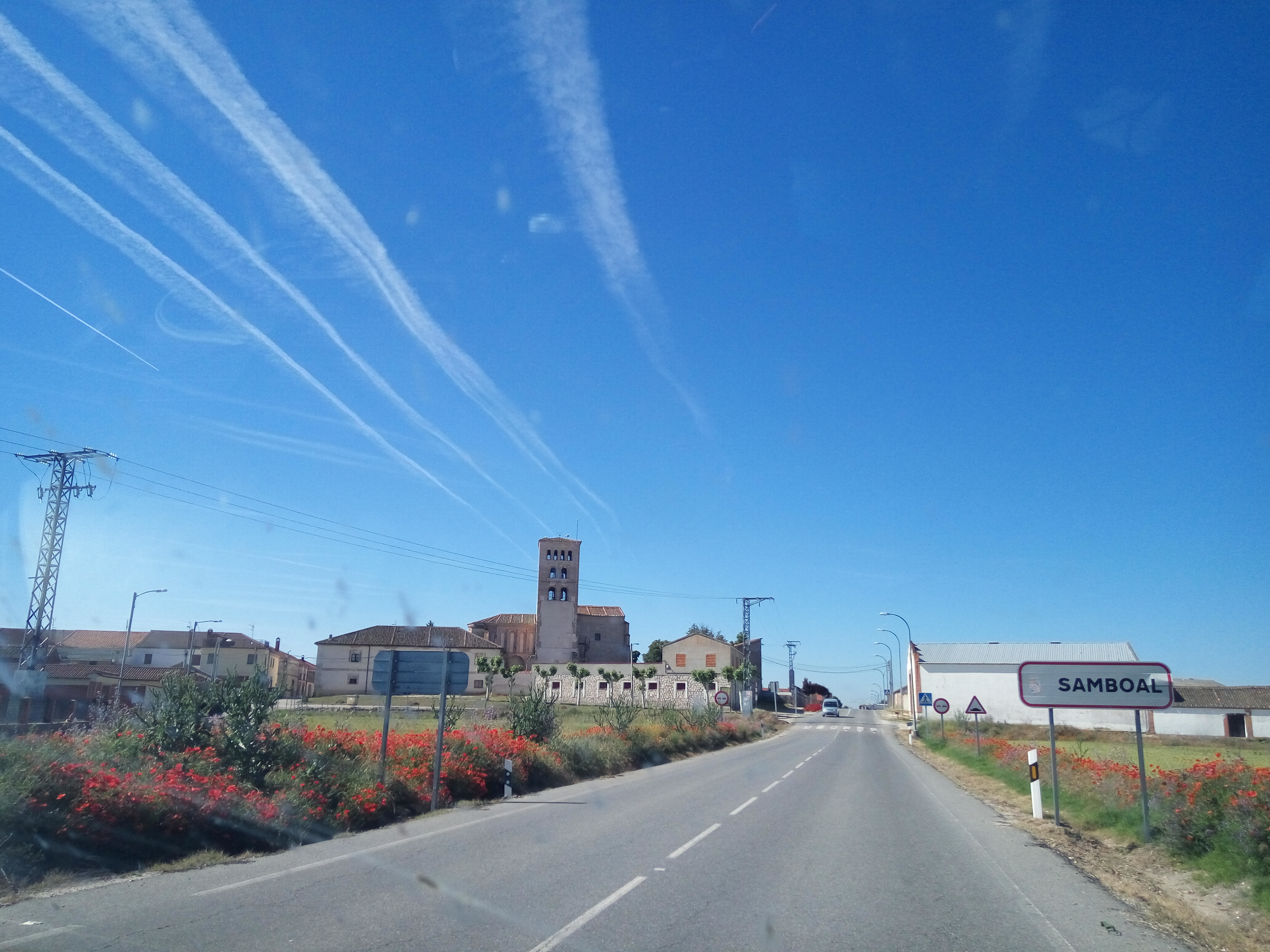

- Flag Coat of arms

- Location in Spain. Samboal (Spain)
- Coordinates: 41°15′30″N 4°25′02″W
- Country: Spain
- Autonomous community: Castile and León
- Province: Segovia
- Municipality: Samboal

Area
  - Total: 47 km^{2} (18 sq mi)

Population (2025-01-01)
  - Total: 459
  - Density: 9.8/km^{2} (25/sq mi)
- Time zone: UTC+1 (CET)
  - Summer (DST): UTC+2 (CEST)
- Website: Official website

Samboal is a municipality located in the province of Segovia, Castile and León, Spain. According to the 2004 census (INE), the municipality had a population of 560.
