= Viloria =

Coordinates: 41.450°N 4.383°W

Viloria, Spain
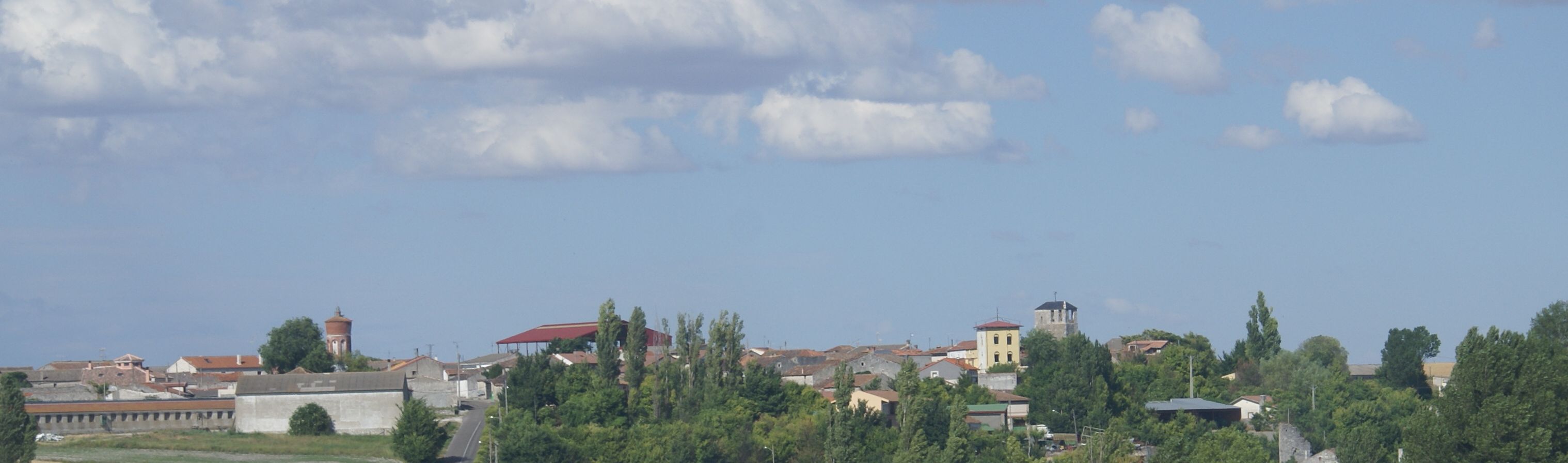
- view
- Country: Spain
- Autonomous community: Castile and León
- Province: Valladolid
- Municipality: Viloria

Area
  - Total: 11.15 km^{2} (4.31 sq mi)
- Elevation: 866 m (2,841 ft)

Population (2025-01-01)
  - Total: 338
  - Density: 30.3/km^{2} (78.5/sq mi)
- Time zone: UTC+1 (CET)
  - Summer (DST): UTC+2 (CEST)

Viloria is a municipality located in the province of Valladolid, Castile and León, Spain. According to the 2004 census (INE), the municipality had a population of 388 inhabitants.

== See also ==
- Cuisine of the province of Valladolid
