= Zarzuela del Pinar =

Spanish town

- Municipality
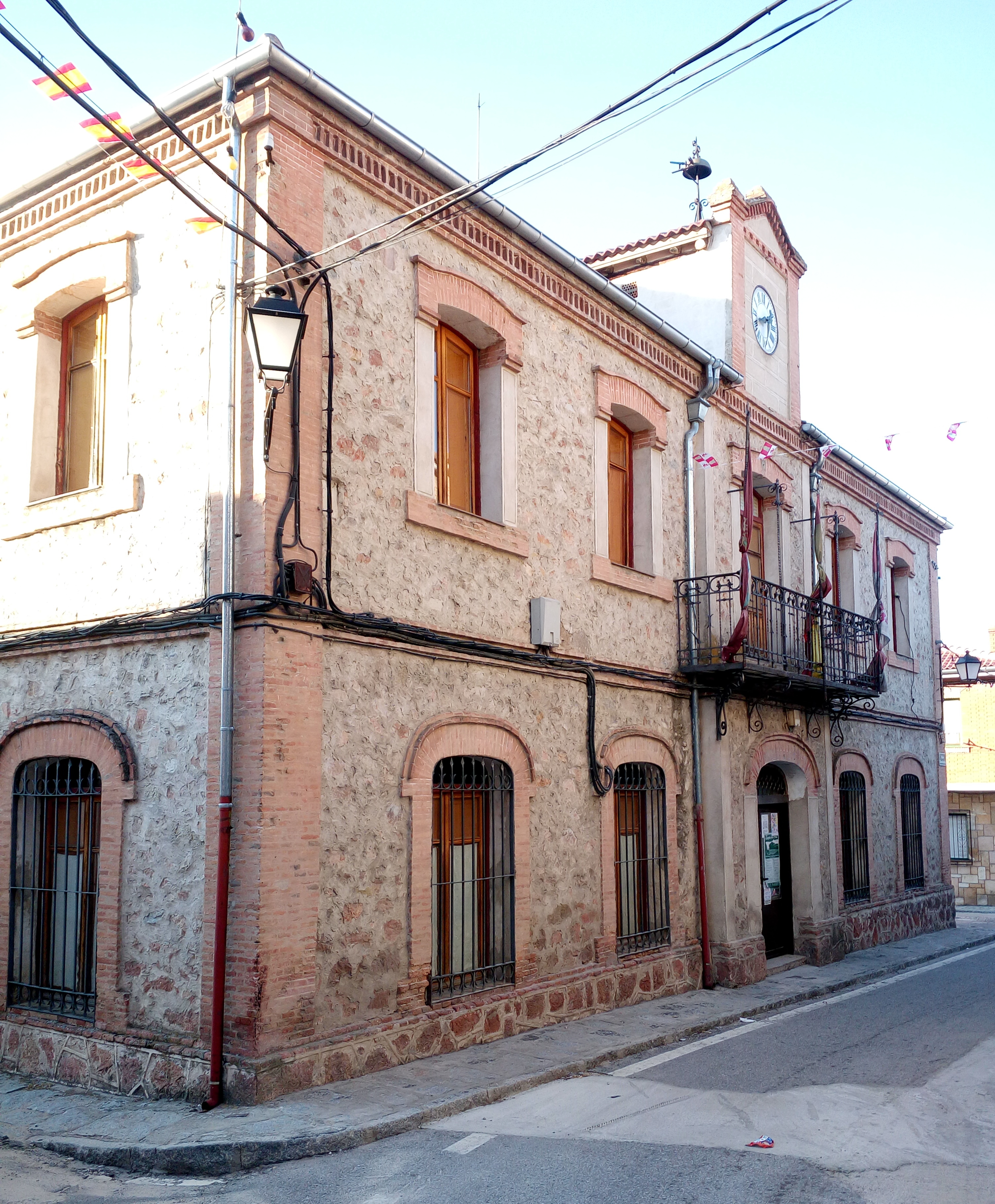

- Location in Spain. Zarzuela del Pinar (Spain)
- Coordinates: 41°15′37″N 4°11′04″W
- Country: Spain
- Community: Castile and León
- Province: Segovia

Government
  - Mayor: Eleuterio Nicolás Ortega Lobo

Area
  - Total: 17.76 km^{2} (6.86 sq mi)
- Elevation: 893 m (2,930 ft)

Population (2025-01-01)
  - Total: 408
  - Density: 23.0/km^{2} (59.5/sq mi)
- Time zone: UTC+1 (CET)
  - Summer (DST): UTC+2 (CEST)
- Website: Official website

Zarzuela del Pinar is a municipality located in the province of Segovia, Castile and León, Spain.

== History ==
In 1869, the house of the town's priest was stoned and shot at as a part of the tension between clergy and anticlerical revolutionaries of the Sexenio Democrático.
