= Fresneda de Cuéllar =

- Municipality
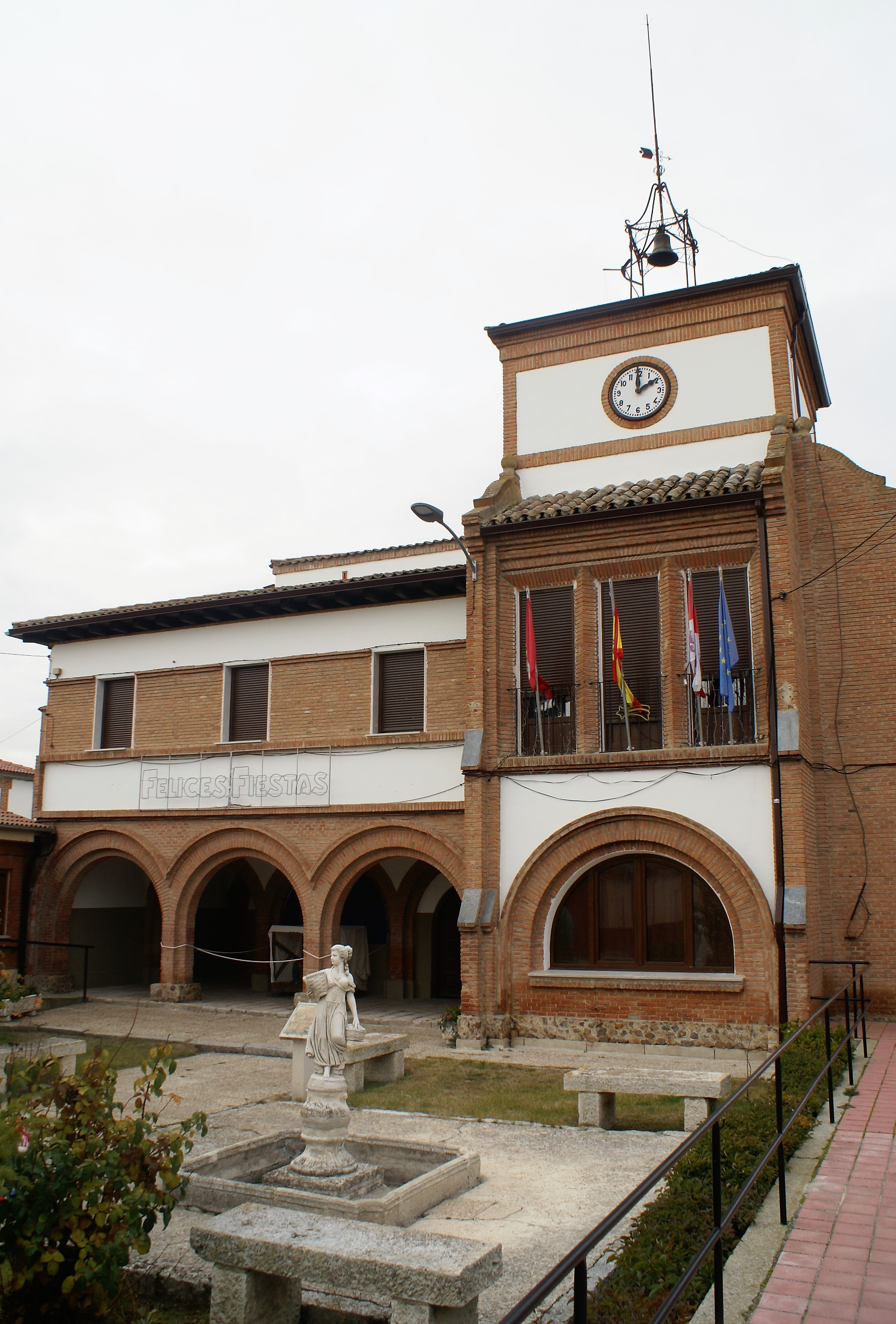
- Fresneda de Cuéllar Town hall.

- Location in Spain. Fresneda de Cuéllar (Spain)
- Coordinates: 41°19′07″N 4°26′57″W
- Country: Spain
- Autonomous community: Castile and León
- Province: Segovia
- Municipality: Fresneda de Cuéllar

Area
  - Total: 11 km^{2} (4.2 sq mi)

Population (2025-01-01)
  - Total: 162
  - Density: 15/km^{2} (38/sq mi)
- Time zone: UTC+1 (CET)
  - Summer (DST): UTC+2 (CEST)
- Website: Official website

Fresneda de Cuéllar is a municipality located in the province of Segovia, Castile and León, Spain. According to the 2004 census (INE), the municipality has a population of 222 inhabitants.
