= Olombrada =

- Municipality
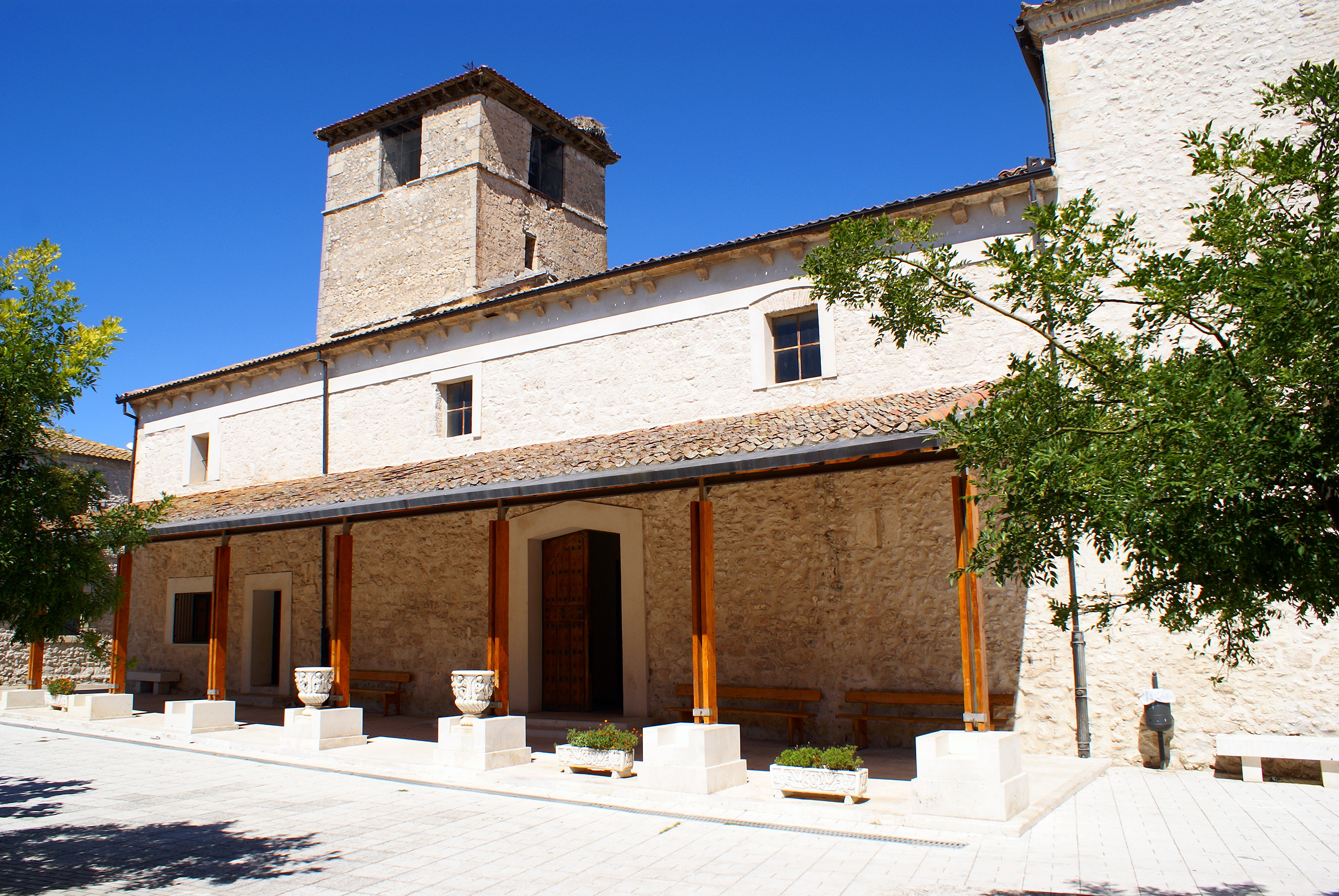

- Flag Coat of arms

- Location in Spain. Olombrada (Spain)
- Coordinates: 41°25′00″N 4°09′30″W
- Country: Spain
- Autonomous community: Castile and León
- Province: Segovia
- Municipality: Olombrada

Area
  - Total: 66 km^{2} (25 sq mi)

Population (2025-01-01)
  - Total: 490
  - Density: 7.4/km^{2} (19/sq mi)
- Time zone: UTC+1 (CET)
  - Summer (DST): UTC+2 (CEST)
- Website: Official website

Olombrada is a municipality located in the province of Segovia, Castile and León, Spain. According to the 2004 census (INE), the municipality has a population of 778 inhabitants.

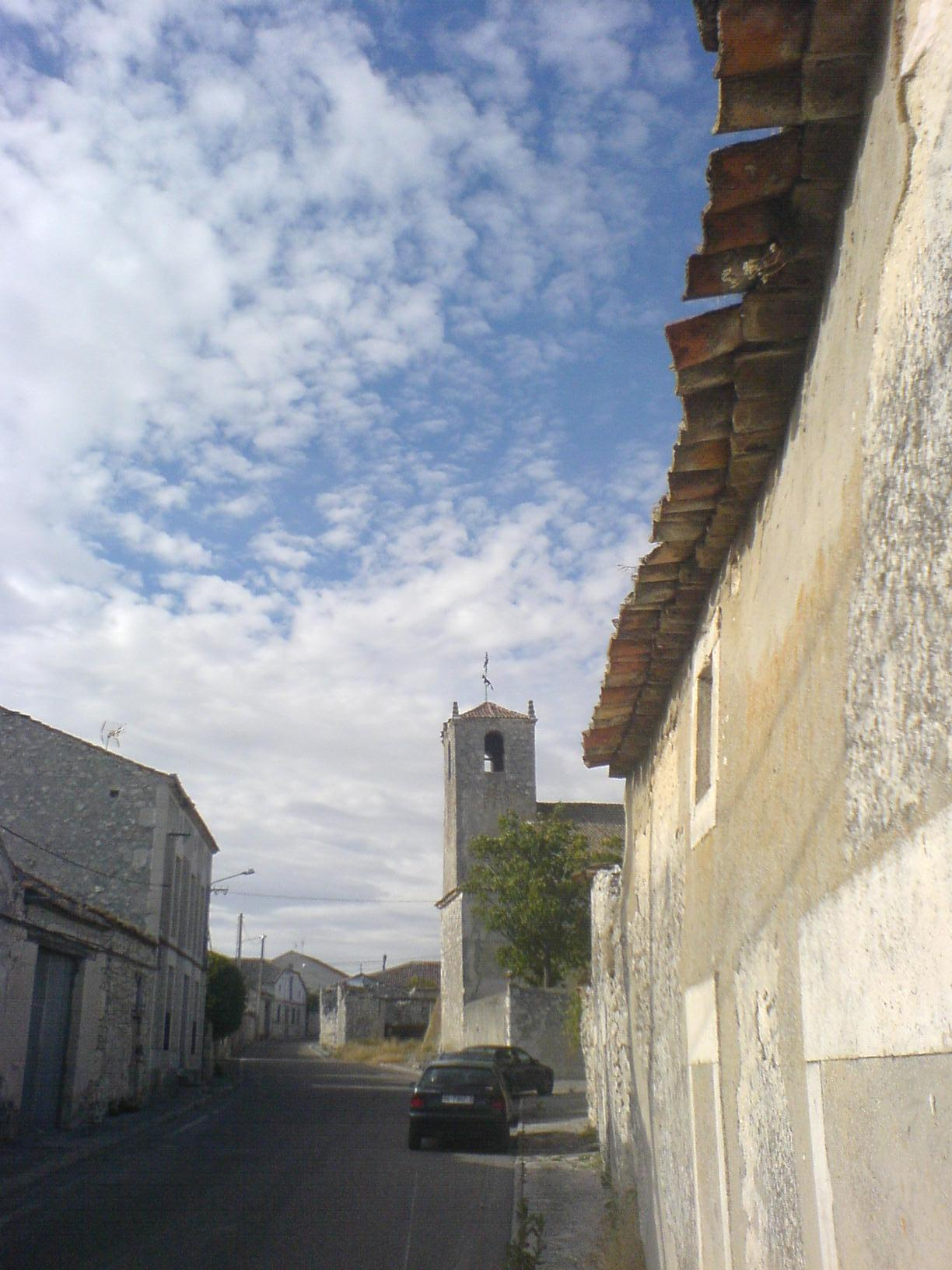
Moraleja de Cuéllar, Olombrada.

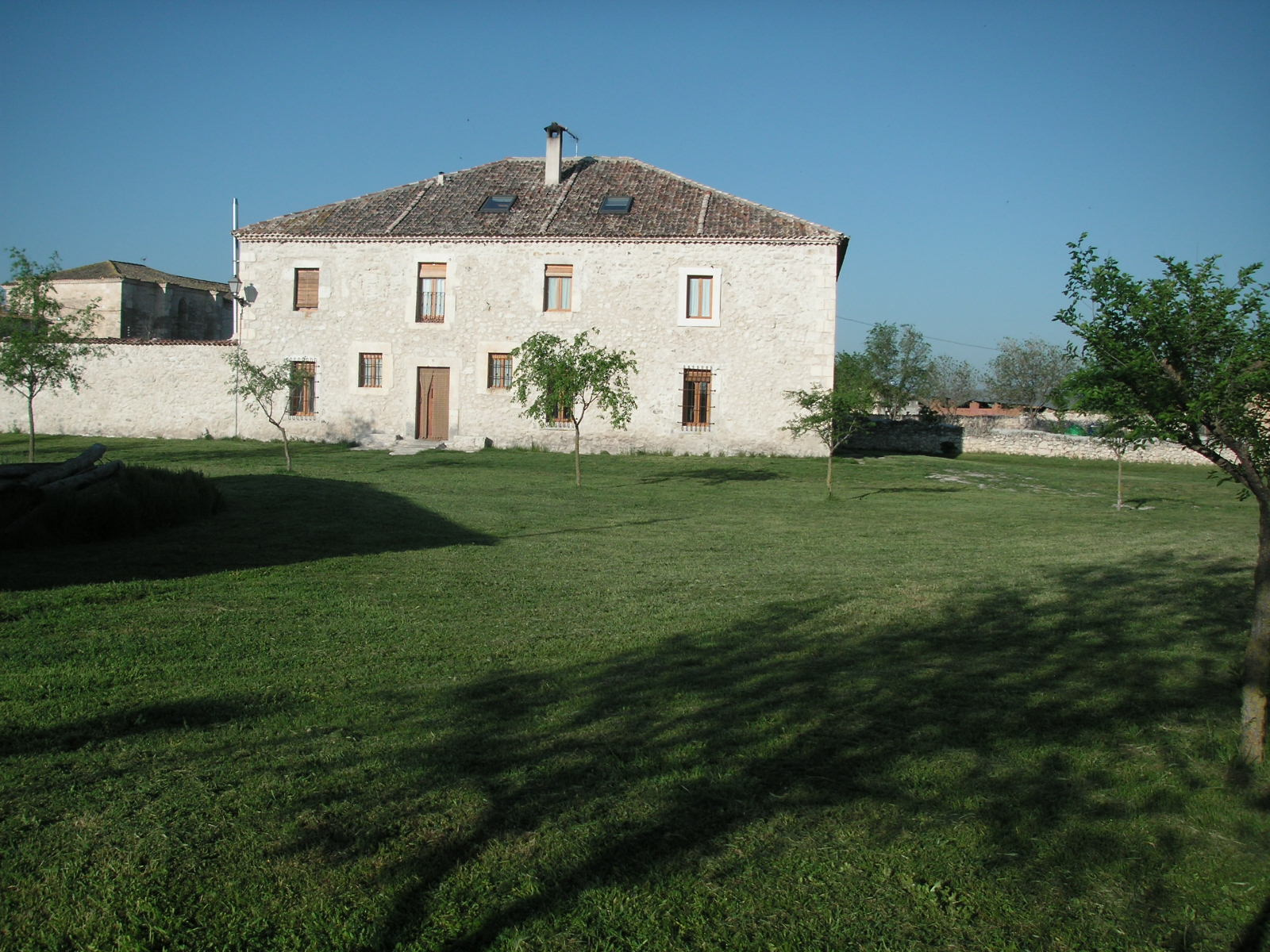
'El Lagar de Vegafría', rural house in Vegafría, Olombrada.

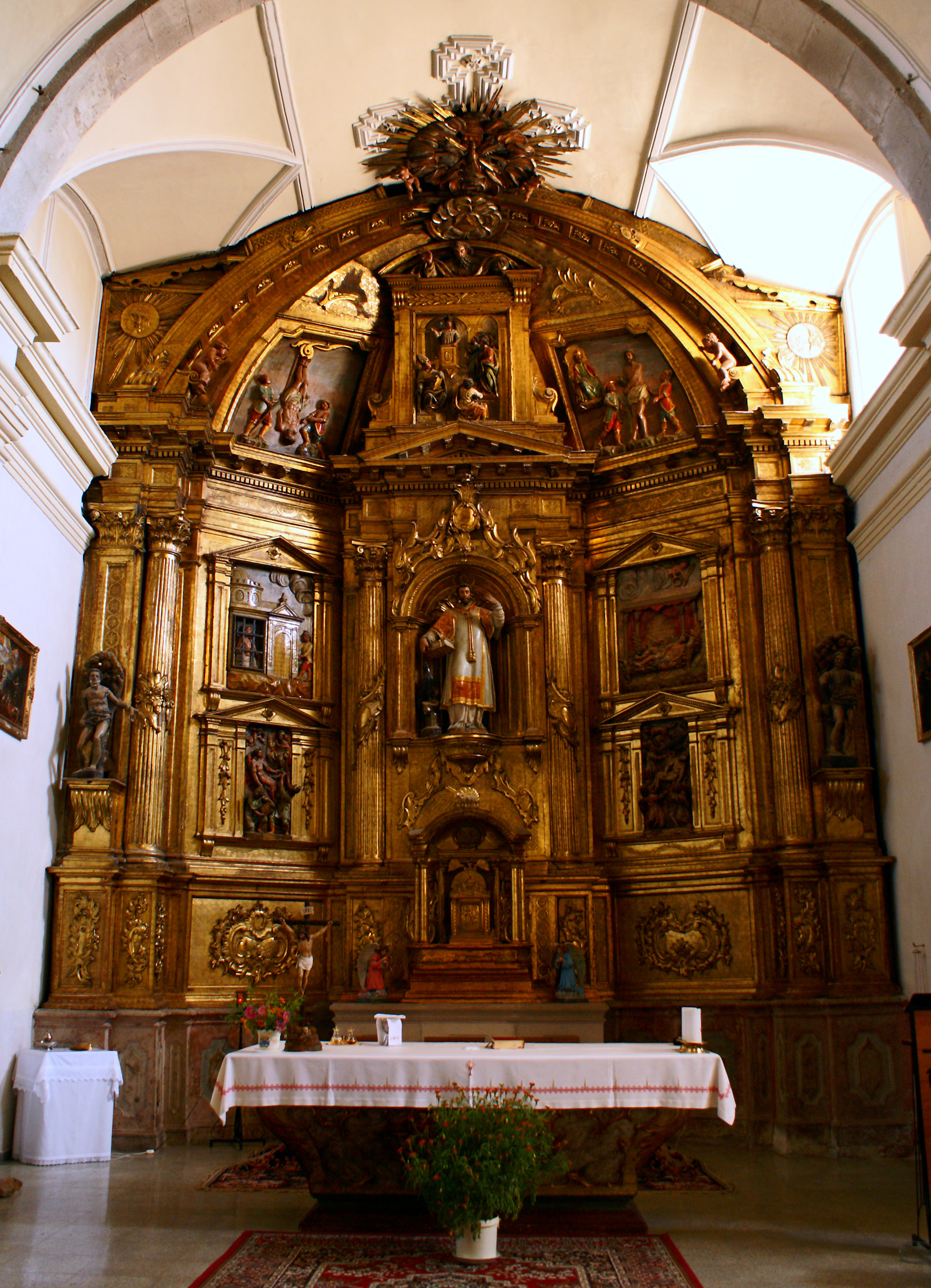
San Vicente Martir church, retable

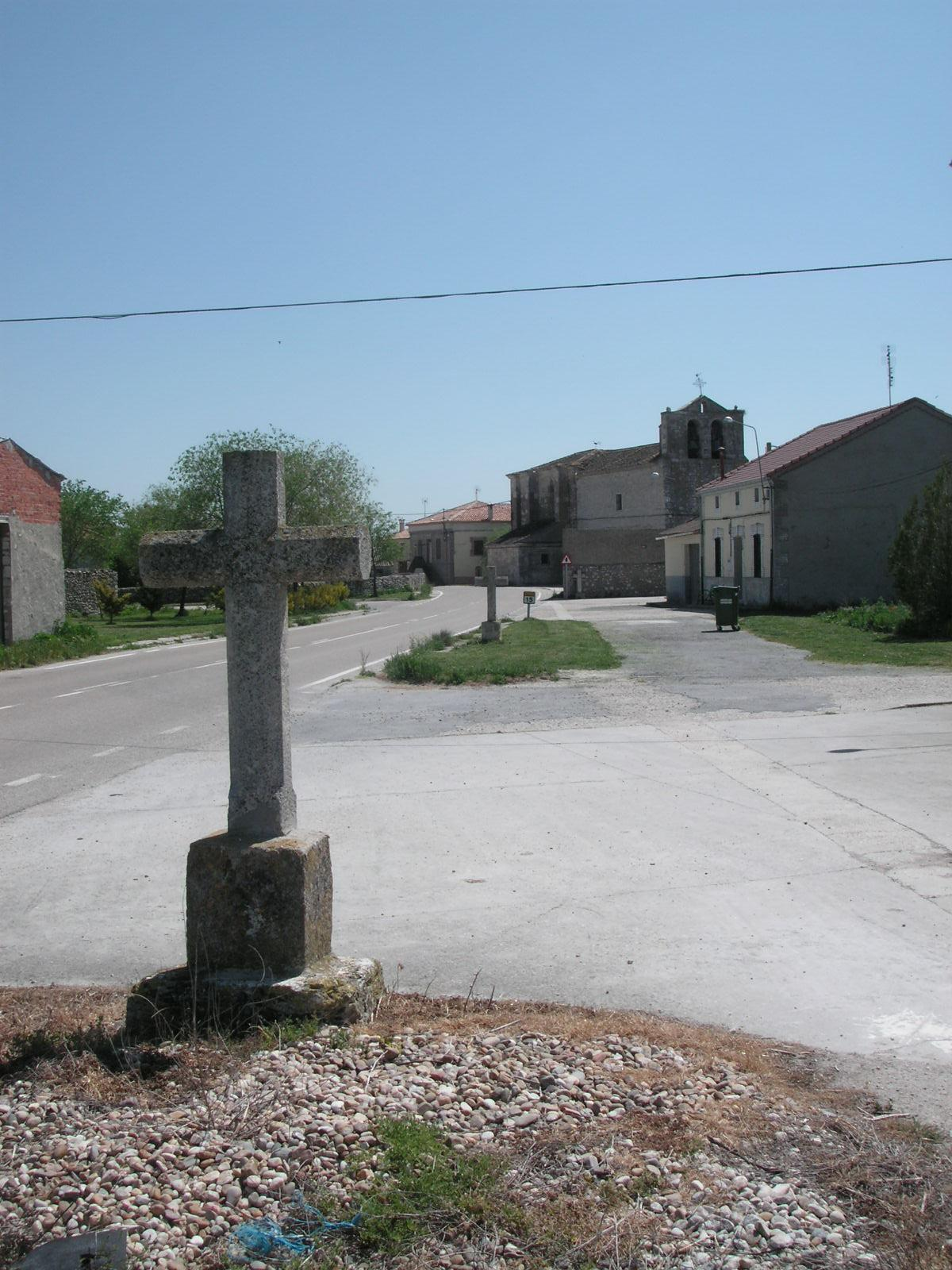
La quinta Estación del Via Crucis of Vegafría.

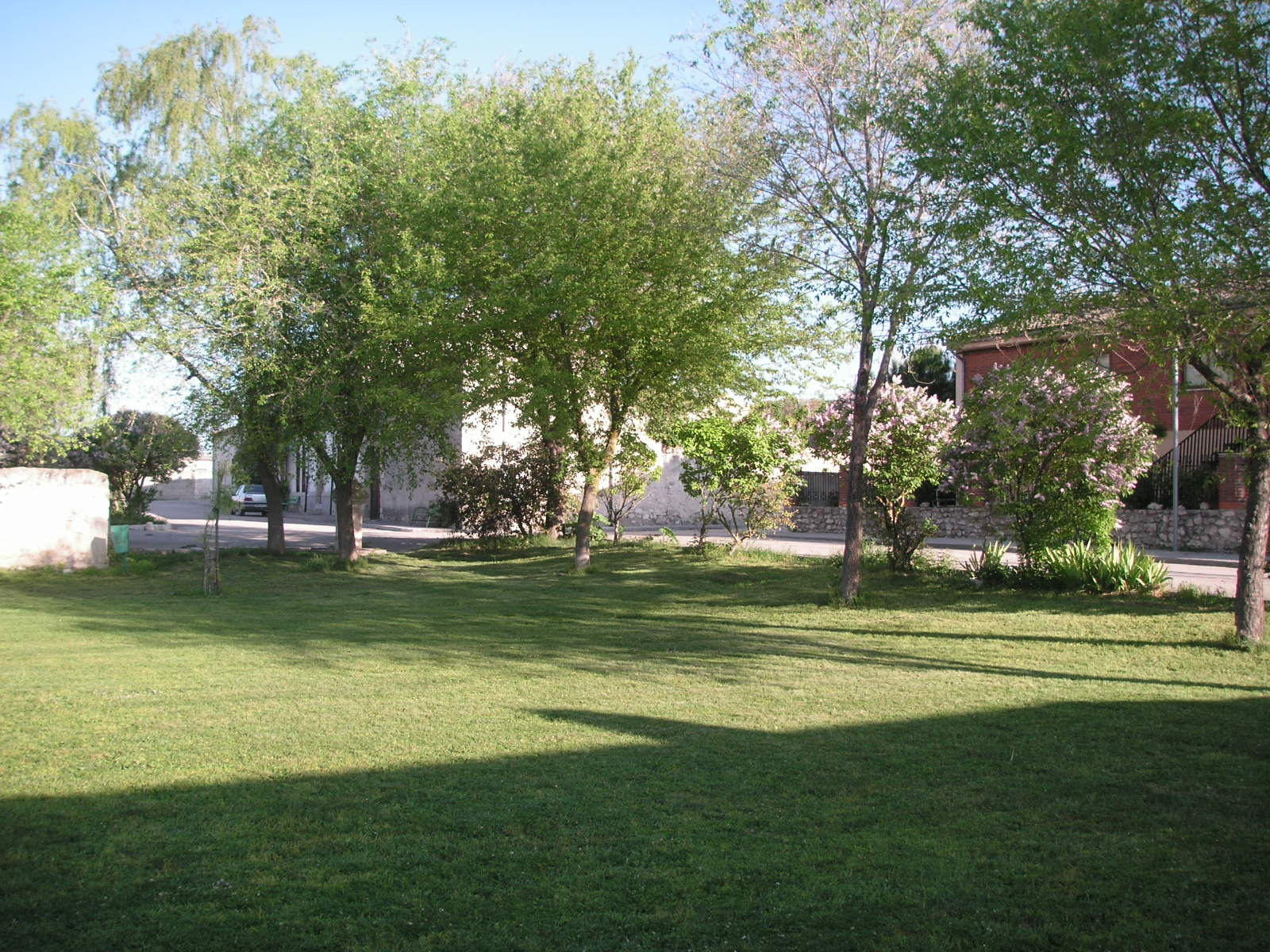
El Pradillo.
