= Vallelado =

- Municipality
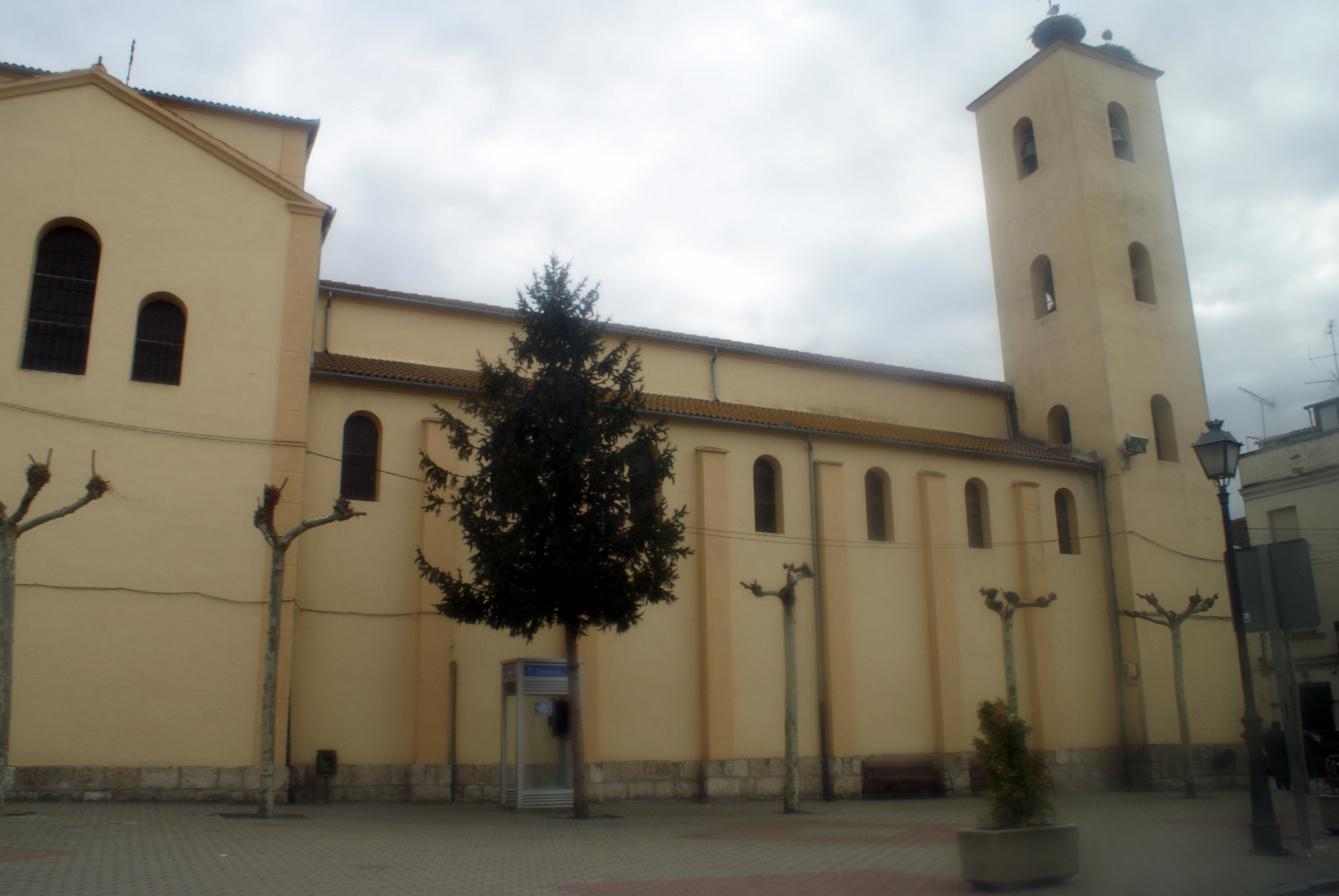
- Church of Santo Tomás

- Flag Coat of arms

- Location in Spain. Vallelado (Spain)
- Coordinates: 41°24′20″N 4°25′35″W
- Country: Spain
- Autonomous community: Castile and León
- Province: Segovia
- Municipality: Vallelado

Area
  - Total: 36 km^{2} (14 sq mi)

Population (2025-01-01)
  - Total: 750
  - Density: 21/km^{2} (54/sq mi)
- Time zone: UTC+1 (CET)
  - Summer (DST): UTC+2 (CEST)
- Website: Official website

Vallelado is a municipality located in the province of Segovia, Castile and León, Spain. According to the 2004 census (INE), the municipality has a population of 831 inhabitants.
