= Bahabón =

- Municipality
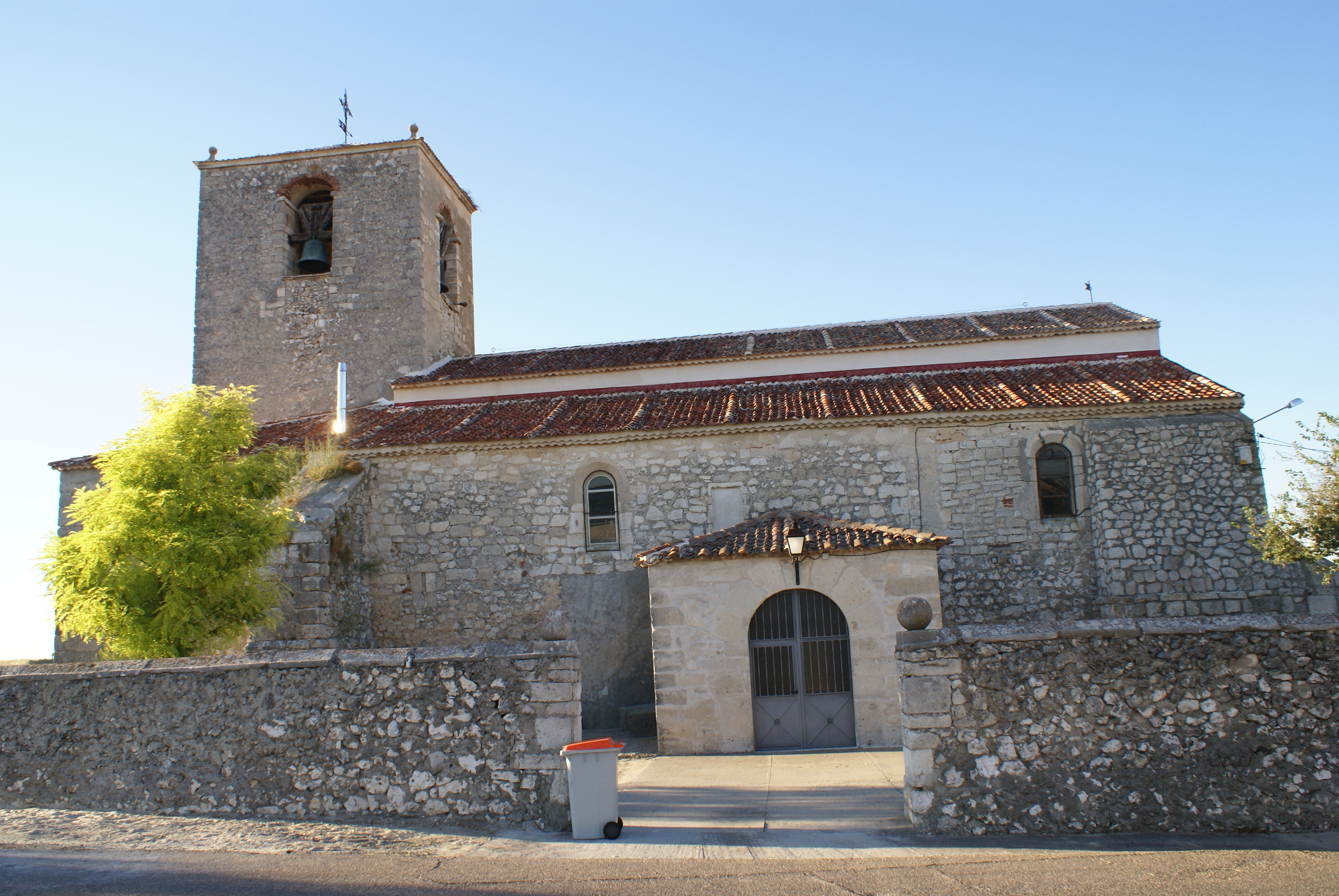
- Church of the Assumption in Bahabón.

- Coat of arms

- Location of Berbinzana. Bahabón (Castile and León)
- Coordinates: 41°29′N 4°17′W
- Country: Spain
- Community: Castile and León
- Province: Valladolid
- Comarca: Campo de Peñafiel

Area
  - Total: 20.71 km^{2} (8.00 sq mi)

Population (2023)
  - Total: 81
  - Density: 3.9/km^{2} (10/sq mi)
- Time zone: UTC+1 (CET)
  - Summer (DST): UTC+2 (CEST)
- Postal code: 47312
- Website: www.bahabon.ayuntamientosdevalladolid.es

Bahabón, a small village and municipality in the province of Valladolid, Spain. It has a population of 81 (2023) and an area of 20.71 km^{2}.
