= Gomezserracín =

- Municipality
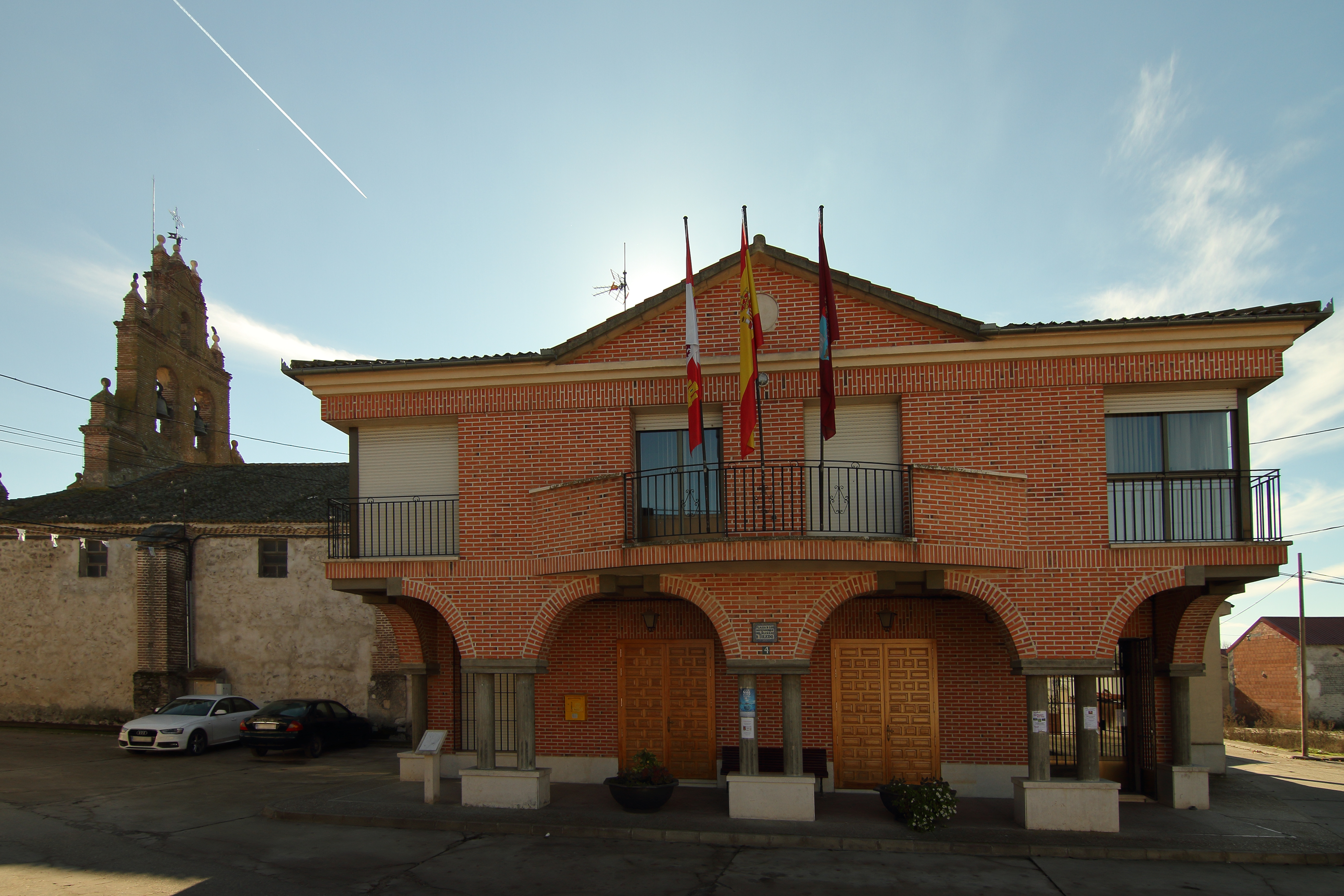
- Town hall

- Coat of arms

- Location in Spain. Gomezserracín (Spain)
- Coordinates: 41°17′19″N 4°19′35″W
- Country: Spain
- Autonomous community: Castile and León
- Province: Segovia
- Municipality: Gomezserracín

Area
  - Total: 3,026 km^{2} (1,168 sq mi)

Population (2025-01-01)
  - Total: 614
- Time zone: UTC+1 (CET)
  - Summer (DST): UTC+2 (CEST)
- Website: Official website

Gomezserracin is a municipality of Segovia, Castilla y Leon, Spain. It has an area of 30.26 km² and through which it crosses the A-601, the highway of Pinares. In 2017, it had 699 inhabitants.

== History ==
It was founded by the noble Gomez Sarracin in the 13th century, who gave its name to the place. He was the father of Fernando Sarracin, who became bishop of Segovia.

== Shield ==
The shield representing the municipality was officially approved on January 28, 2016.

== Parties ==
- San Isidro Labrador. It is celebrated on May 15 and the saint is brought to Zamorana decorated with flowers.
- Saint Anthony of Padua. It is celebrated on July 13 and is the town's patron.
- Santa Maria Magdalena. It is celebrated on July 22, is the patron saint and the holidays are the largest in the municipality.
