= Torrescárcela =

Coordinates: 41°29′N 4°19′W

Torrescárcela, Spain
- Coat of arms

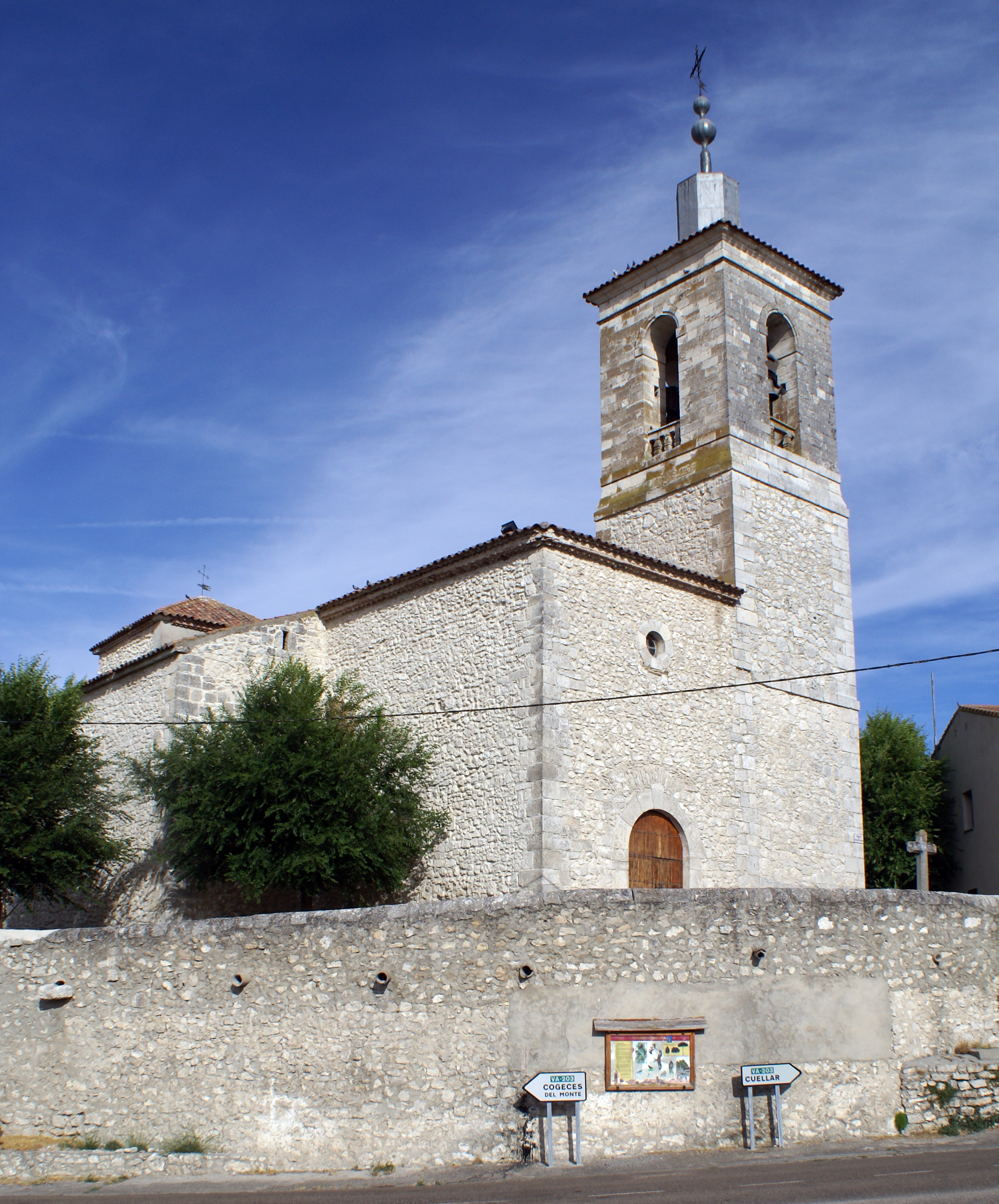
- church
- Country: Spain
- Autonomous community: Castile and León
- Province: Valladolid
- Municipality: Torrescárcela

Area
  - Total: 50.87 km^{2} (19.64 sq mi)

Population (2025-01-01)
  - Total: 162
  - Density: 3.18/km^{2} (8.25/sq mi)
- Time zone: UTC+1 (CET)
  - Summer (DST): UTC+2 (CEST)

Torrescárcela is a municipality located in the province of Valladolid, Castile and León, Spain. According to the 2004 census (INE), the municipality has a population of 164 inhabitants.
