= Hontalbilla =

- Municipality
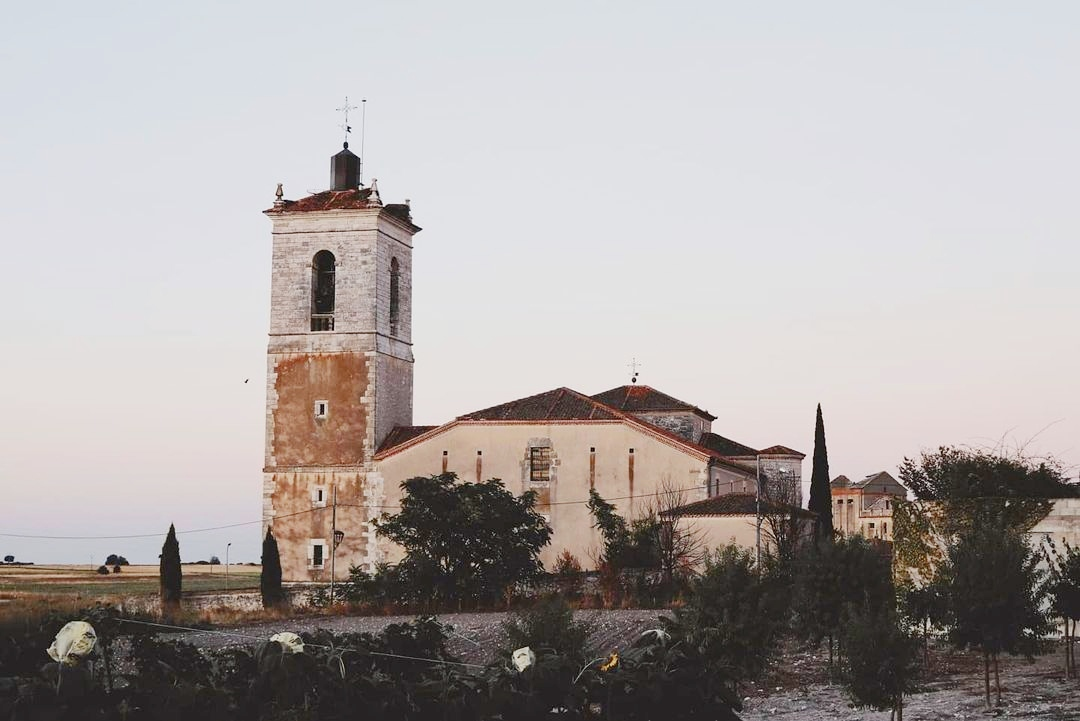
- Church of San Pedro and entrance to the town

- Location in Spain. Hontalbilla (Spain)
- Coordinates: 41°20′42″N 4°07′17″W
- Country: Spain
- Autonomous community: Castile and León
- Province: Segovia
- Municipality: Hontalbilla

Area
  - Total: 38 km^{2} (15 sq mi)

Population (2025-01-01)
  - Total: 277
  - Density: 7.3/km^{2} (19/sq mi)
- Time zone: UTC+1 (CET)
  - Summer (DST): UTC+2 (CEST)
- Website: Official website

Hontalbilla is a municipality located in the province of Segovia, Castile and León, Spain. According to the 2004 census (INE), the municipality has a population of 391 inhabitants.

== History ==
Records survive of the village from as far back as 1184 when it was named as "Fontalvella". In 1247 it is mentioned as "Fuent Alviella del Pinar" and then, in the sixteenth century, as "Hontalbilla". Even today spelling errors are frequently made whereby a "v" is substituted for the "b" in the name. However, the final part of the name comes from the name "Fuente Albilla" ("Albilla Spring") and has nothing to do with any villa.

The extent and quality of the pine trees in the area over the centuries is supported by many sources. In the middle of the nineteenth century Pascual Madoz, writing in his (Spanish) Historical Dictionary of Geography and Statistics ("Diccionario Geográfico-Estadístico-Histórico"), mentioned the large and high-quality Corsican pines from which were manufactured the best wood-based products in the land.
