= Pinarejos =

- Municipality
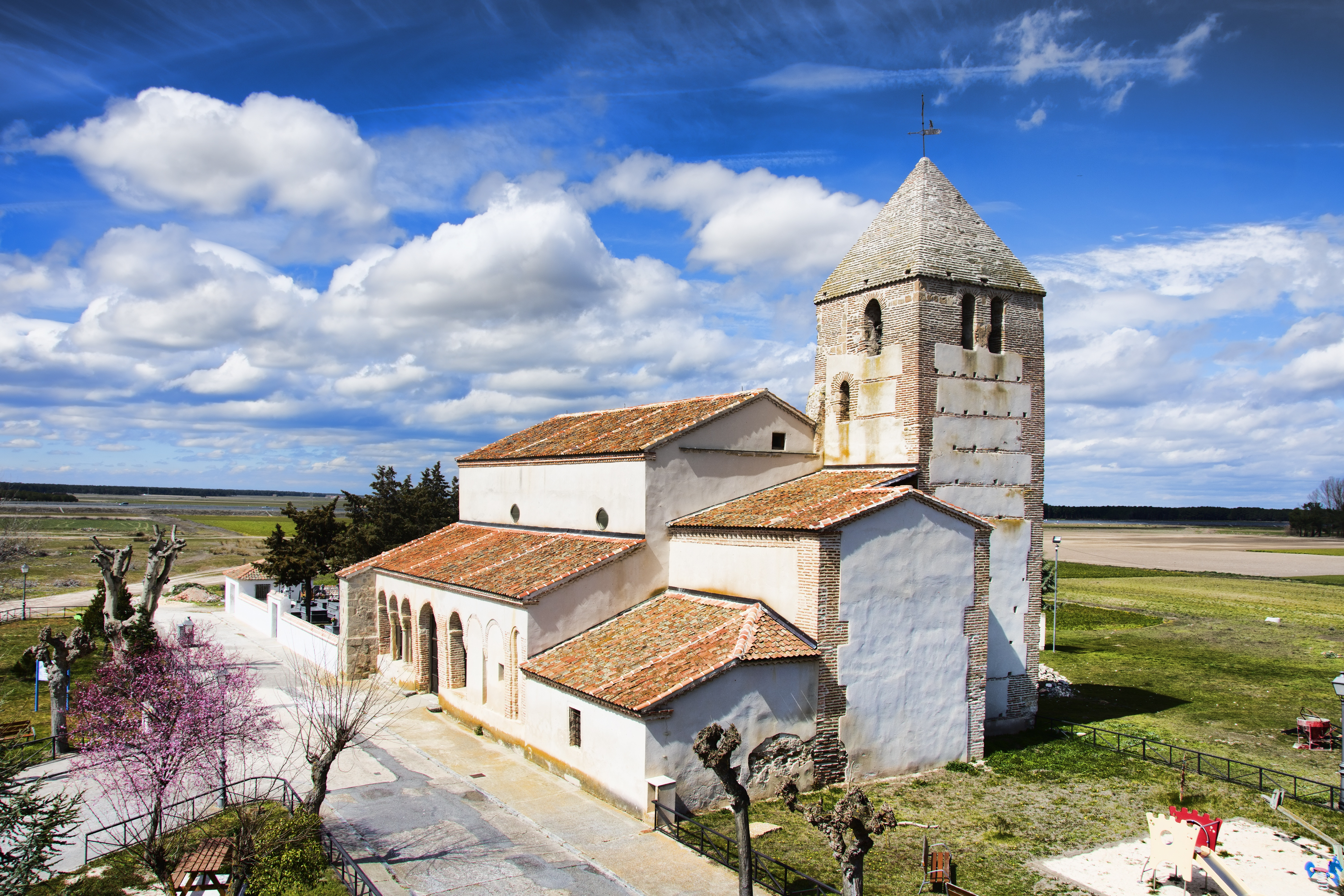
- Church of the Assumption

- Location in Spain. Pinarejos (Spain)
- Coordinates: 41°15′35″N 4°17′37″W
- Country: Spain
- Autonomous community: Castile and León
- Province: Segovia
- Municipality: Pinarejos

Area
  - Total: 29 km^{2} (11 sq mi)

Population (2025-01-01)
  - Total: 205
  - Density: 7.1/km^{2} (18/sq mi)
- Time zone: UTC+1 (CET)
  - Summer (DST): UTC+2 (CEST)
- Website: Official website

Pinarejos is a municipality located in the province of Segovia, Castile and León, Spain. According to the 2004 census (INE), the municipality has a population of 173 inhabitants.
