= Mata de Cuéllar =

- Municipality
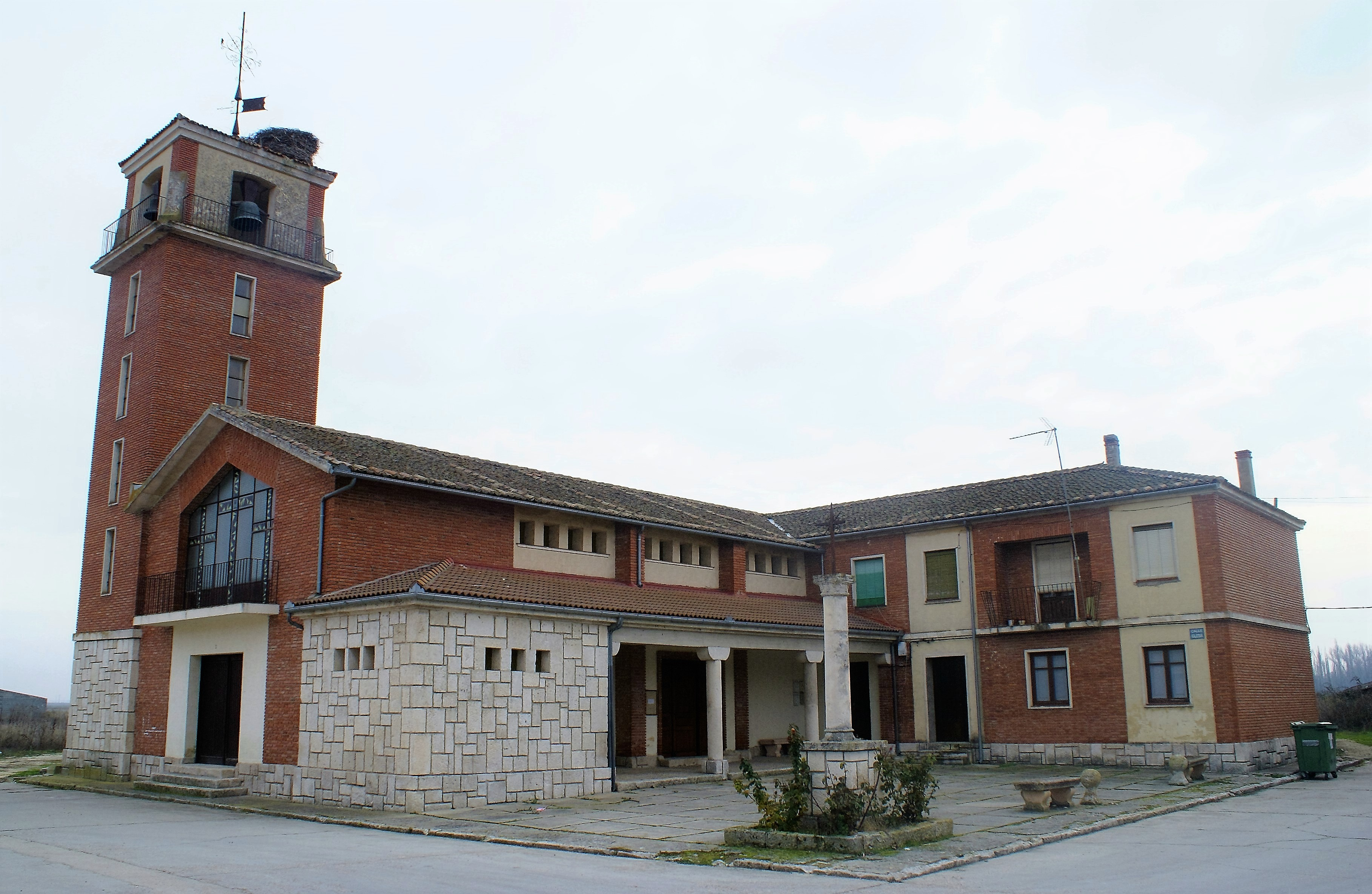
- Church of San Esteban, Mata de Cuéllar, Segovia, Spain.

- Location in Spain. Mata de Cuéllar (Spain)
- Coordinates: 41°23′47″N 4°28′17″W
- Country: Spain
- Autonomous community: Castile and León
- Province: Segovia
- Municipality: Mata de Cuéllar

Area
  - Total: 20 km^{2} (7.7 sq mi)

Population (2025-01-01)
  - Total: 261
  - Density: 13/km^{2} (34/sq mi)
- Time zone: UTC+1 (CET)
  - Summer (DST): UTC+2 (CEST)
- Website: Official website

Mata de Cuéllar is a municipality located in the province of Segovia, Castile and León, Spain. According to the 2004 census (INE), the municipality has a population of 301 inhabitants.
