= Sanchonuño =

- Municipality
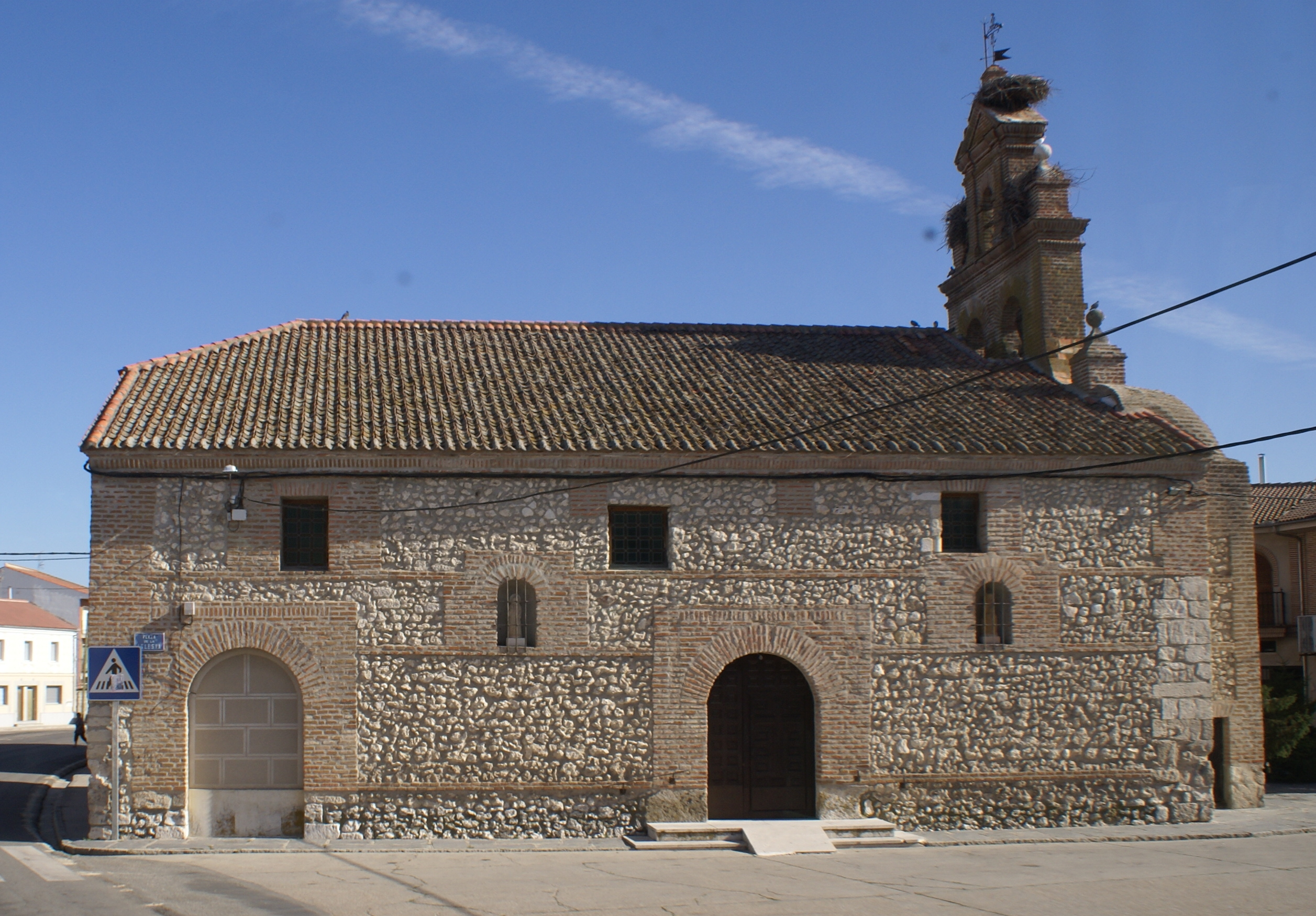
- Parish church of Saint Thomas, built in the 16th century.

- Flag Coat of arms

- Location in Spain. Sanchonuño (Spain)
- Coordinates: 41°19′24″N 4°18′18″W
- Country: Spain
- Autonomous community: Castile and León
- Province: Segovia
- Municipality: Sanchonuño

Area
  - Total: 29.27 km^{2} (11.30 sq mi)
- Elevation: 802 m (2,631 ft)

Population (2025-01-01)
  - Total: 1,053
  - Density: 35.98/km^{2} (93.18/sq mi)
- Time zone: UTC+1 (CET)
  - Summer (DST): UTC+2 (CEST)
- Website: Official website

Sanchonuño is a municipality located in the province of Segovia, Castile and León, Spain. According to the 2004 census (INE), the municipality has a population of 824 inhabitants.
