= San Martín y Mudrián =

- Municipality
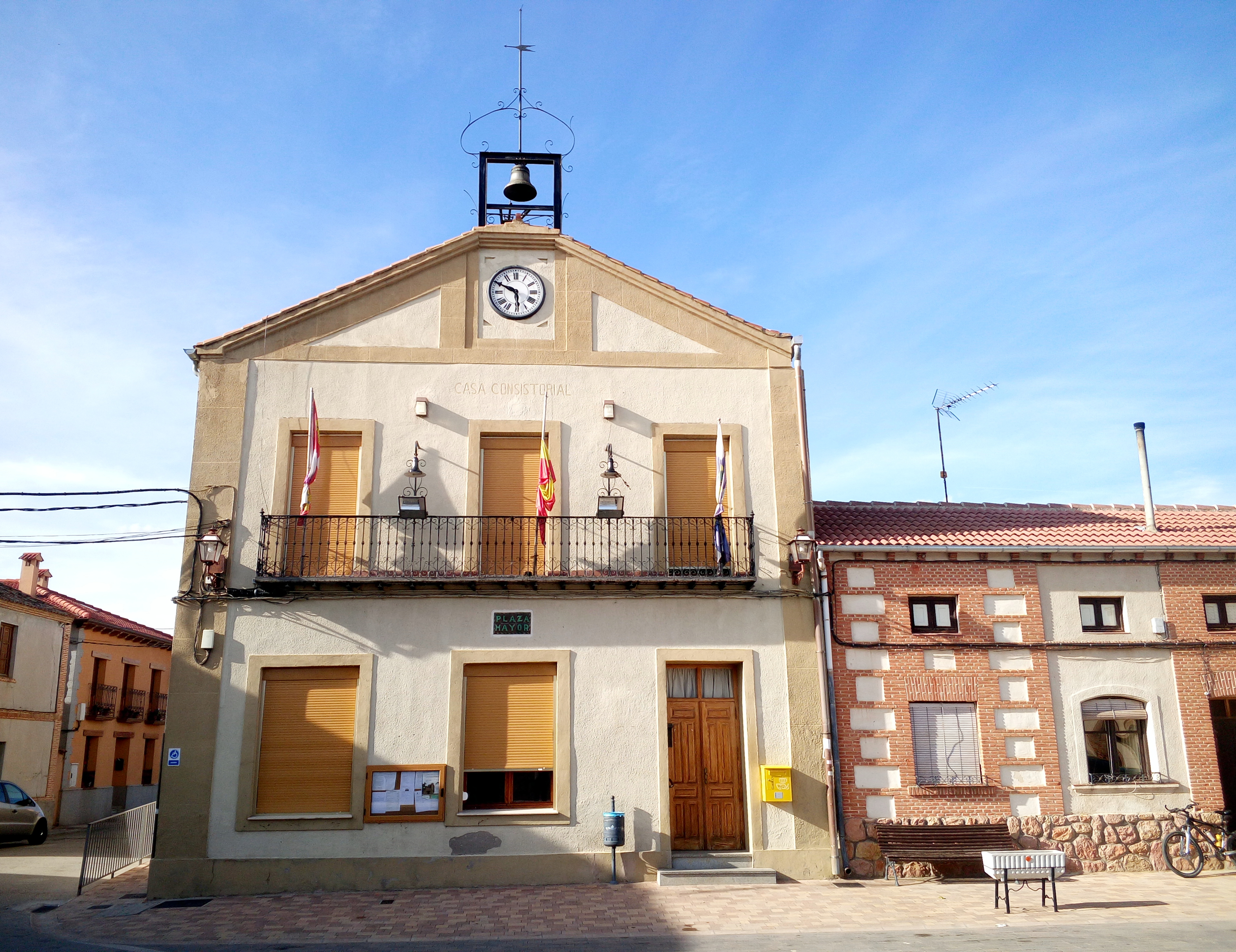
- Town hall

- Flag Coat of arms

- Location in Spain. San Martín y Mudrián (Spain)
- Coordinates: 41°13′24″N 4°19′55″W
- Country: Spain
- Autonomous community: Castile and León
- Province: Segovia
- Municipality: San Martín y Mudrián

Area
  - Total: 42.56 km^{2} (16.43 sq mi)
- Elevation: 820 m (2,690 ft)

Population (2025-01-01)
  - Total: 263
  - Density: 6.18/km^{2} (16.0/sq mi)
- Time zone: UTC+1 (CET)
  - Summer (DST): UTC+2 (CEST)
- Website: Official website

San Martín y Mudrián is a municipality located in the province of Segovia, Castile and León, Spain. According to the 2004 census (INE), the municipality had a population of 266 inhabitants.
