= San Cristóbal de Cuéllar =

- Municipality
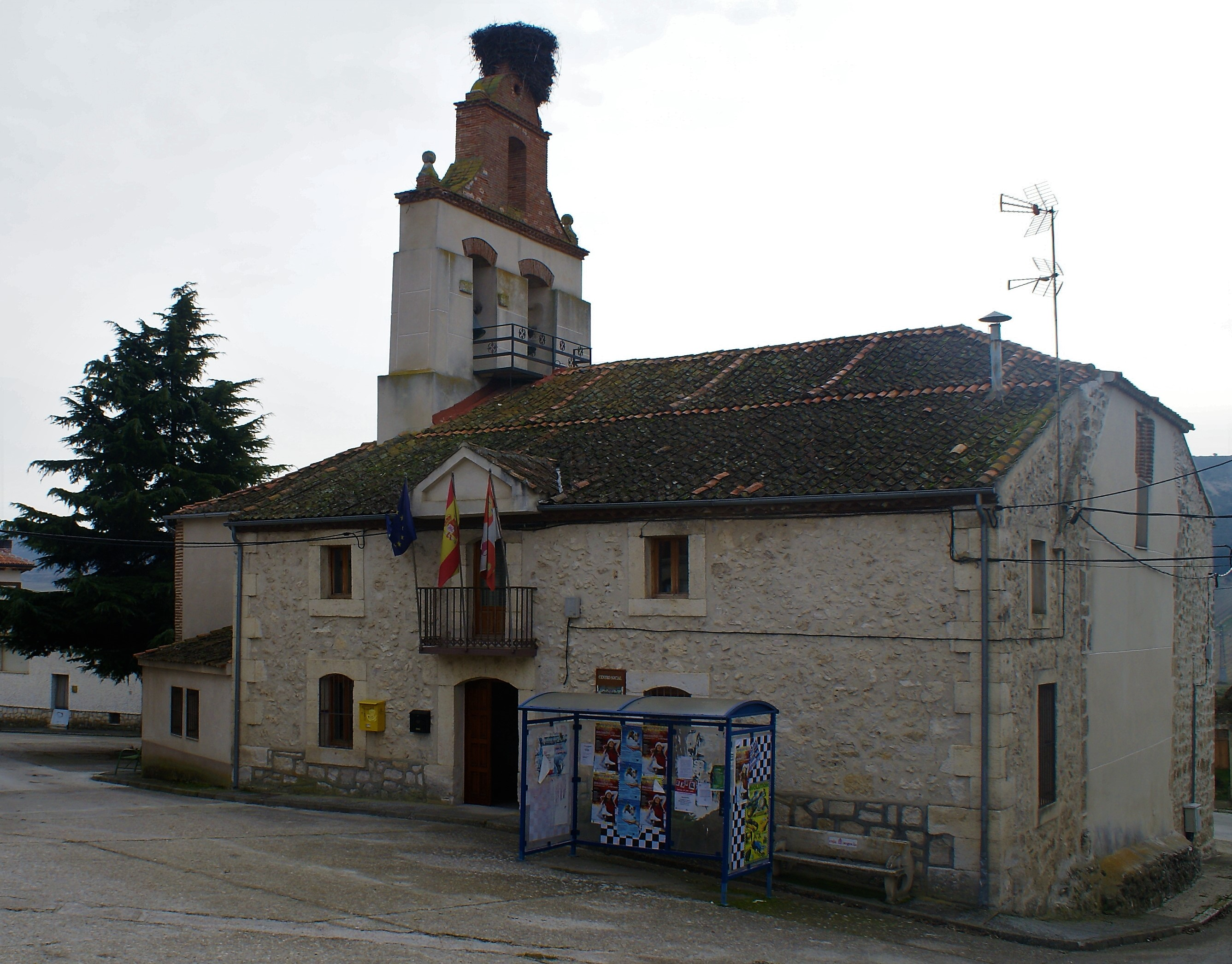
- San Cristóbal de Cuéllar Town Hall Building

- Location in Spain. San Cristóbal de Cuéllar (Spain)
- Coordinates: 41°24′19″N 4°24′15″W
- Country: Spain
- Autonomous community: Castile and León
- Province: Segovia
- Municipality: San Cristóbal de Cuéllar

Area
  - Total: 14 km^{2} (5.4 sq mi)

Population (2025-01-01)
  - Total: 161
  - Density: 12/km^{2} (30/sq mi)
- Time zone: UTC+1 (CET)
  - Summer (DST): UTC+2 (CEST)
- Website: Official website

San Cristóbal de Cuéllar is a municipality located in the province of Segovia, Castile and León, Spain. According to the 2025 census (INE), the municipality has a population of 161 inhabitants.
