= Lastras de Cuéllar =

- Municipality
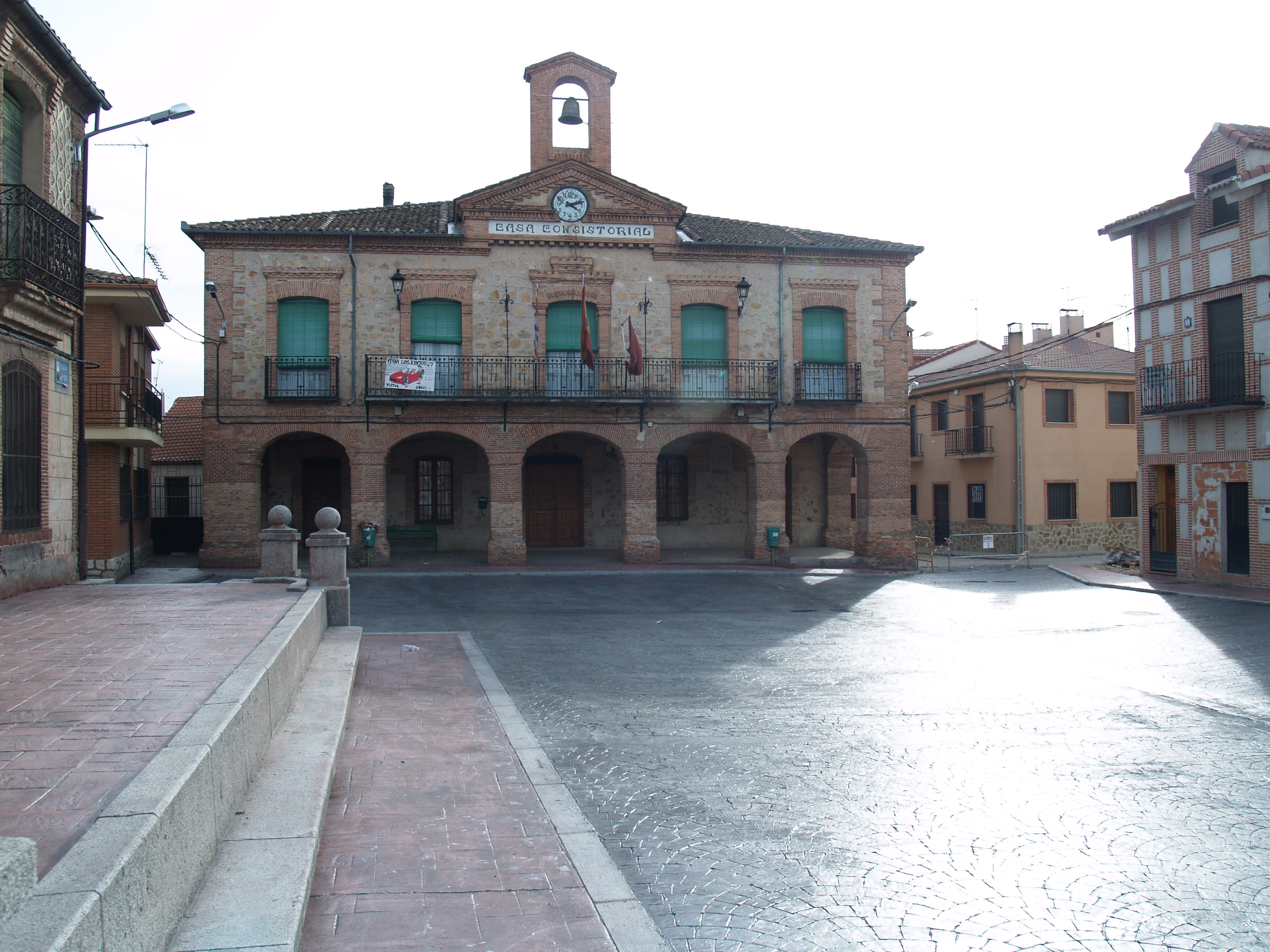
- Main square and Town hall

- Coat of arms

- Location in Spain. Lastras de Cuéllar (Spain)
- Coordinates: 41°17′50″N 4°06′27″W
- Country: Spain
- Autonomous community: Castile and León
- Province: Segovia
- Municipality: Lastras de Cuéllar

Area
  - Total: 65 km^{2} (25 sq mi)

Population (2025-01-01)
  - Total: 295
  - Density: 4.5/km^{2} (12/sq mi)
- Time zone: UTC+1 (CET)
  - Summer (DST): UTC+2 (CEST)
- Website: Official website

Lastras de Cuéllar is a municipality located in the province of Segovia, Castile and León, Spain. According to the 2004 census (INE), the municipality has a population of 487 inhabitants.

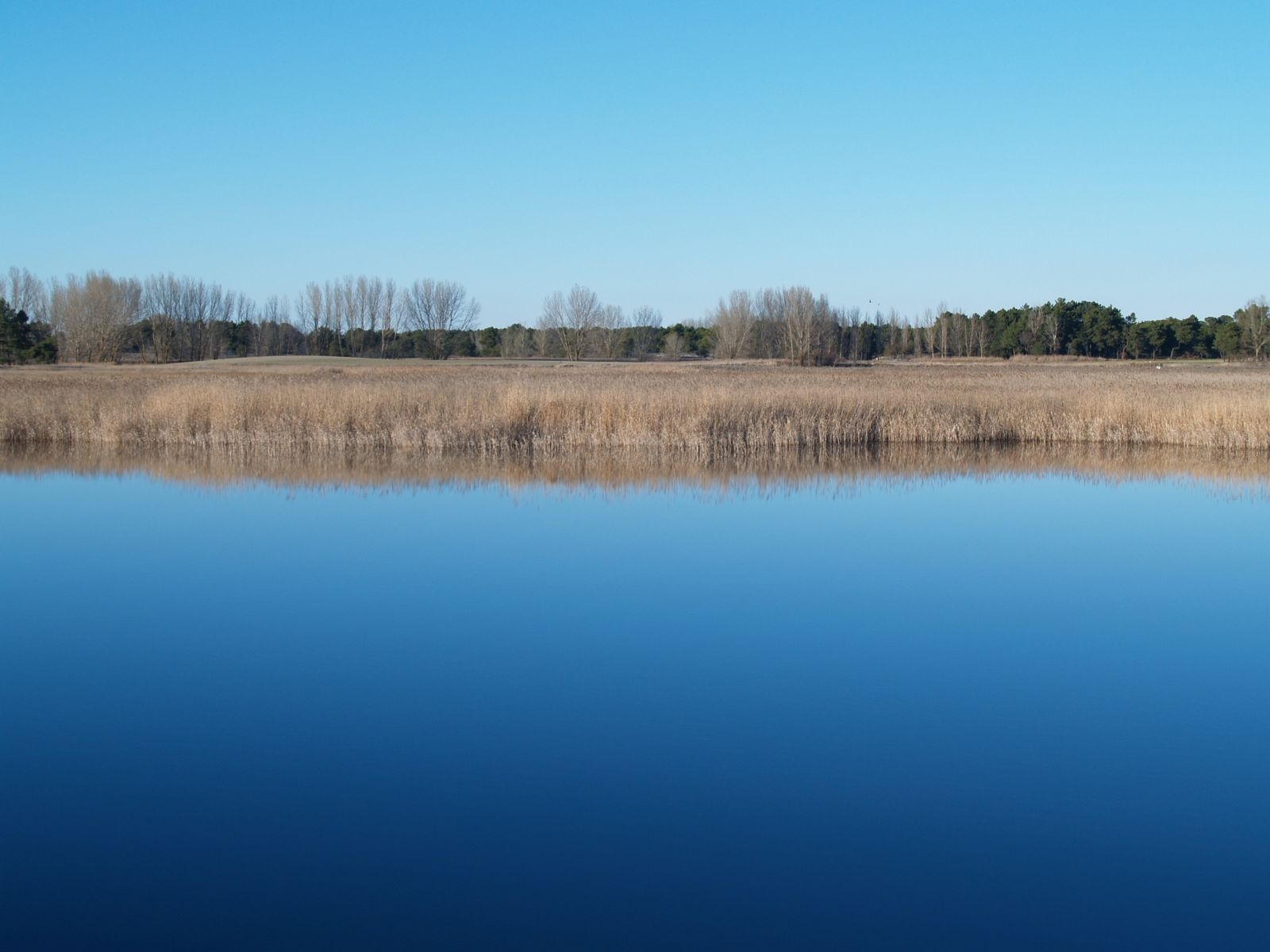
Laguna del Carrizal.
