= Villaseca =

Villaseca may refer to:

- Daniel Villaseca (born 2003), Czech footballer
- Marco Villaseca (born 1975), Chilean footballer
- Villaseca de Arciel, a municipality in Castile and León, Spain
- Villaseca de Henares, a municipality in Castile-La Mancha, Spain
- Villaseca de la Sagra, a municipality in Castile-La Mancha, Spain
- Villaseca de Uceda, a municipality in Castile-La Mancha, Spain

== See also ==
- Vila-seca, a municipality of the comarca of Tarragonès, Catalonia, Spain
