= Don Quijote cabalga de nuevo =

- Directed by: Roberto Gavaldón
- Screenplay by: Carlos Blanco Hernández
- Based on: Don Quixote by Miguel de Cervantes
- Produced by: Francisco Ruiz; Luis F. Rodríguez; María Luisa Llorente; María Teresa Saéz; Roberto Gavaldón
- Starring: Mario Moreno «Cantinflas» Fernando Fernán Gómez; María Fernanda D'Ocón
- Cinematography: Francisco Sempere
- Edited by: Juan Serra
- Music by: Waldo de los Ríos
- Production companies: Estudios Cinematográficos Roma; Rioma Films; Producciones Óscar
- Distributed by: Columbia Pictures
- Release dates: 9 March 1973 (Spain); 10 May 1973 (Mexico)
- Countries: Spain; Mexico
- Language: Spanish
- Box office: 69,807,068 pesetas (Spain)

Don Quijote cabalga de nuevo (English: Don Quijote Rides Again) is a 1973 Spanish-Mexican comedy film, directed by Roberto Gavaldón and starring Mario Moreno «Cantinflas» as Sancho Panza, Fernando Fernán Gómez as Don Quixote, and María Fernanda D'Ocón as Dulcinea. This film is loosely based on Miguel de Cervantes's novel Don Quixote.

== Plot ==
Don Quijote is obsessed with chivalry and its codes of honour. Accompanied by his peculiar squire Sancho Panza, he embarks on a series of adventures in which he is mocked and tricked by some, while others try to help him recover his sanity. But neither Don Quixote nor Sancho give up trying to protect humanity.

== Cast ==
- Mario Moreno «Cantinflas» as Sancho Panza
- Fernando Fernán Gómez as Alonso Quijano "Don Quijote"
- María Fernanda D'Ocón as Aldonza Lorenzo "Dulcinea del Toboso"
- Paca Gabaldón as Altisidora (credited as Mary Francis)
- Ricardo Merino as Bachelor Sansón Carrasco
- José Orjas as Judge
- Emilio Laguna as Duke
- Alberto Fernández as Pedro Pérez, the parish priest
- Laly Soldevila as Duchess
- María Luisa Ponte as Landlady of Don Alonso Quijano
- Serafín García Vázquez
- Valeriano Andrés as Master Nicholas, the barber (credited as Valeriano de Andres)
- Rafael Hernández as Young man in the street with Aldonza
- Manuel Alexandre as Young man in court case tried by Sancho Panza
- Luis Morris as Angulo the Bad, comedian
- Agustín González as Duke's Butler
- Valentín Tornos as Baldomero Fernández, notary
- Diana Lorys as Young woman in court case tried by Sancho Panza
- Javier Escrivá as Miguel de Cervantes

== Filming locations ==
- Peñaranda de Duero
- Talamanca de Jarama
- Villaseca de Uceda
- Torrelaguna
- Manzanares el Real
- La Pedriza
- El Romeral
- Consuegra
- Puerto de Despeñaperros
- Estudios Cinematográficos Roma, Madrid, Spain
- Palacio de Avellaneda

== Awards and honors ==
The film was shown in the 2019 edition of the San Sebastian International Film Festival as part of a retrospective of Roberto Gavaldón's work.

== Bibliography ==
- de Paranaguá, Paulo Antonio. Mexican Cinema. British Film Institute, 1995.
