= José Fernández Salvador =

Ecuadorian lawyer (1775–1853)

- Born: January 23, 1775; Quito, Real Audiencia of Quito, Spanish Empire
- Died: October 1, 1853 (aged 78); Quito, Republic of Ecuador
- Education: Colegio de San Luis, Universidad de Santo Tomas de Aquino
- Occupations: politician and jurist
- Known for: played a major part in defining the jurisprudence of the young Ecuadorian nation
- Notable work: leading the first constitutional convention in Ecuador in 1830
- Parents: Dr. Andrés Fernández-Salvador (father); Rosa Lopez (mother)

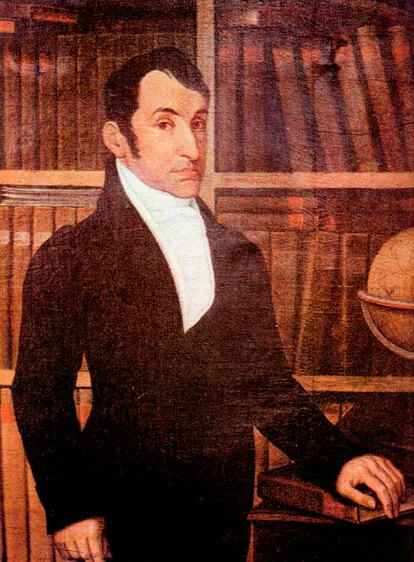

José Fernández-Salvador (January 23, 1775 – October 1, 1853) was an Ecuadorian politician and jurist, known as a "liberal among the criollos" (that is, those born in Latin America of full Spanish blood). He played a major part in defining the jurisprudence of the young Ecuadorian nation, notably leading the first constitutional convention there in 1830.

== Biography ==
He was born in Quito on 23 January 1775, son of Dr. Andrés Fernández-Salvador y Medrano and Rosa Lopez. (The Fernandez-Salvador family, one of the most prominent in Quito, was originally from Villoslada in Spain.) His father Andrés Fernández-Salvador y Medrano (holder of the 1769 coat of arms certificate) was the grandson of Antonio Fernández Salvador y Martínez (holder of the 1719 certificate), both of whom were notable figures in colonial Spanish administration.

=== Education ===
After having done his basic studies on scholarship at the Colegio de San Luis, he entered the Universidad de Santo Tomas de Aquino (St. Thomas of Aquinas), where he studied philosophy, law and theology. On April 8, 1799 he received a Ph.D. in civil and canon law, and immediately was received as Advocate of the Royal Audience of Quito.

=== Career ===
During the colonial period he held important public offices as Rapporteur of the Boards of the Treasury, Attorney and Mayor of the Municipality of Quito, Perpetual Alderman of Quito, on the Town Council, Juez de Policia (police magistrate), etc., all between 1799 and 1807, i.e. during the presidency of Baron de Carondelet.

Subsequently, President Ruiz Conde de Castilla appointed him Acting Mayor of Riobamba, a post he held for three years. This was in response to an uprising by the indigenous tribes of Guamote. Though he later showed great concern for indigenous peoples, he responded severely in this case. On August 10, 1809, he was made Senator of the Civil Chamber, created to replace the royal Audience. In 1806, he was made mayor.

He continued to fill a variety of other offices, most under the royal (that is, Spanish) government. Pablo Herrera: "He served the King faithfully, but after the Battle of Pinchincha, he embraced the cause of Independence with enthusiasm and accepted many posts of great importance."

On February 26, 1822, President Juan de la Cruz appointed him Acting Auditor General of War, an office which he resigned two months later.

In 1826, already in Gran Colombia, he was elected senator in Congress, but resigned because General Santander appointed him Judge Minister of the Court of Justice of Quito. Four years later, after Ecuador separated from Gran Colombia, he attended the First Constituent Assembly as a deputy. This was convened by General Juan José Flores and met in the city of Riobamba on August 14, 1830. Fernández Salvador was elected its president. He served as the executive on several occasions and attended the conventions of 1830, 1835, 1843 and 1845, and the congresses of 1837 and 1839.

On October 30, 1830, Ecuador's new leader General Flores made him the general director of the Estudios de Quito. He resigned this post in 1832, but was reappointed to it in 1837 by President Rocafuerte. While in this position, he formulated the Rules of Public Education, the first serious work on this subject in Ecuador.

He was senator for Pinchincha in 1836 and representative to Congress in 1843.

In February 1846, the President of the Republic, Dr. Vicente Ramón Roca, appointed him Minister of the Interior and Foreign Affairs, but he resigned in November 1847. Retired from politics and public life, he died in Quito, October 1, 1853.

Despite his prominence and the important part he played in creating Ecuadorian jurisprudence, he left no personal writings.

=== Family ===
He was very well regarded by Simon Bolivar, who sought his council on important issues. One of his daughters, Josefa, married José Maria Sáenz, the brother of Bolivar's mistress, Manuela Sáenz (who was from a prominent Quito family). Another, Manuela, married Bolivar's French aide-de-camp Charles Eloi Demarquet (their descendants include the French jurist and academician Jean-Jacques Chevallier). His wife, Carmen Gomez de la Torre, was also from a prominent family. All three families left many descendants in Quito.
