= Our Lady of Soterraña de Nieva =

Our Lady of Soterrania de Nieva
- Location: San Agustin church (previous), Intramuros; Minor Basilica of Saint Lorenzo Ruiz (previous); Residence of Imelda Marcos (previous); Privately owned (current)
- Date: 1781
- Witness: Augustinian Order
- Type: Ivory, 18 karat gold
- Approval: none granted
- Shrine: Binondo church
- Patronage: Tolosa
- Attributes: Madonna and Child; Baton sceptre Farthingale dress

Our Lady of Soterraña de Nieva (also spelt Soterrania; "of Subterranean of Nieva") is an 18th-century Roman Catholic image of the Blessed Virgin Mary crafted in part ivory and solid 18 karat gold formerly venerated in the Philippines. The image was previously owned by former First Lady Imelda Marcos. The image is also known among collectors of Catholic religious images under its former Marian title and category of Our Lady of Nieva or Our Lady of Subterranean. The image has its origins in Spain under its recognised title, Our Lady of Soterraña.

== Description ==
The image features the Virgin Mary holding the Child Jesus in her left arm and holding a sceptre in the left hand. The image is detallado and does not wear any fabric clothing, as its farthingale dress is made of solid 18-karat filigree gold. The hands and faces are made of ivory, and features a double aureole halo, with a resplendor facial halo and a crown to match. The image stands on a base surrounded with three cherubim and has an approximate height of 24 inches.

== History and devotion ==
Various novena booklets were printed in honour of the image' prestigious devotion, the earliest being in 1781 already with a full description and imagery, and another printed in 1853. The Augustinian Order were granted custody of the image for sometime, until the 1945 Battle of Manila, when it was considered lost and surfaced under private ownership.

Records of ownership also trace that the image was once venerated in the Minor Basilica of Saint Lorenzo Ruíz de Manila, while another theory holds that the Tuason clan once purchased the image, most notably Don Antonio Tuason, who had a particular preference for colonial fine art.

=== Present ownership ===
The image formerly participated in the annual Grand Marian Procession at Manila Cathedral in Intramuros as late as December 1981. In later years, the image was returned to its original custodian, and was last seen in the private living room of Imelda Marcos during a televised interview by ABS-CBN. It is now under the ownership of Louise Araneta-Marcos.

As of 2015, the image no longer participates in public processions due to its extreme fragility and value.
