= Villoslada =

- Minor local entity
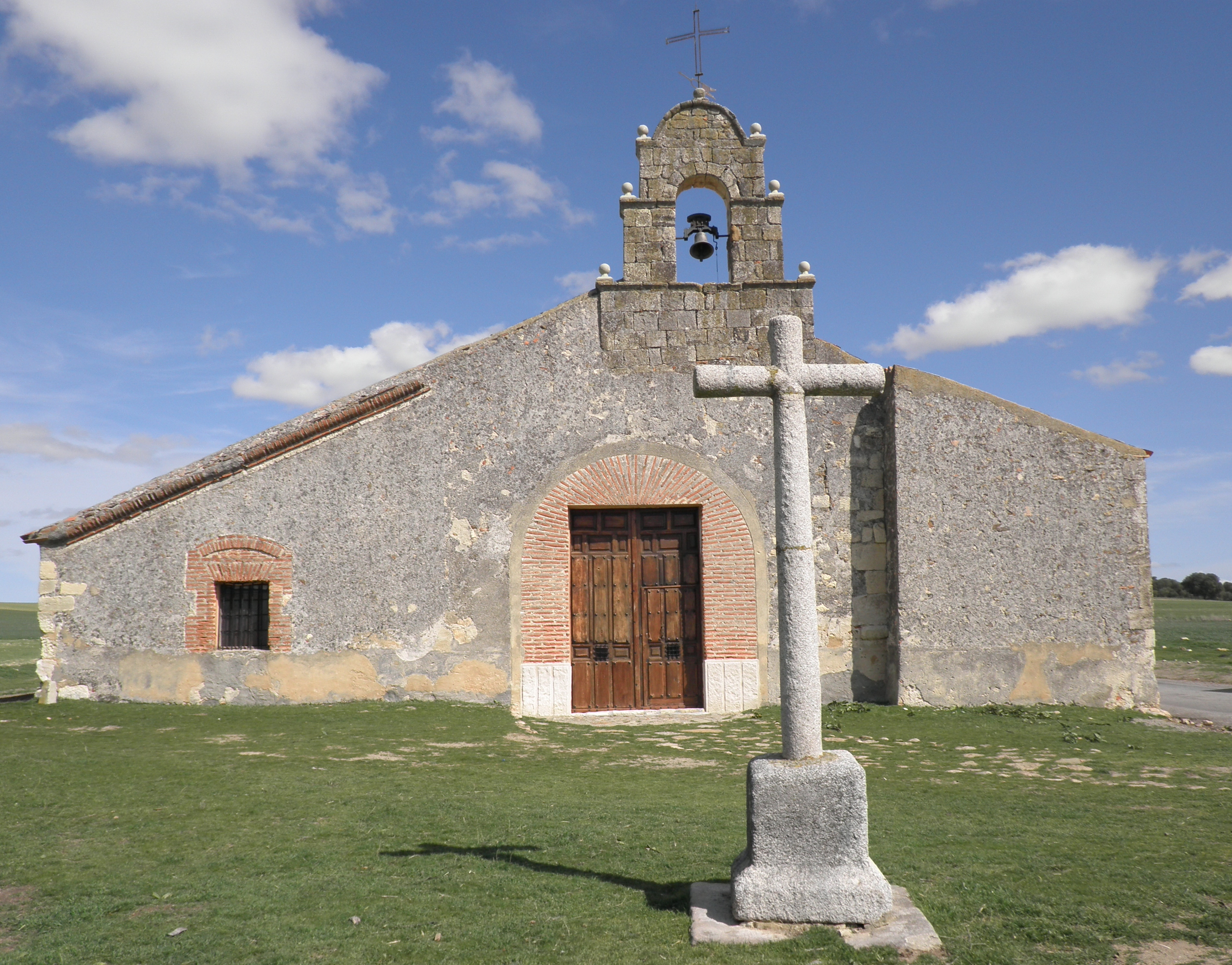
- St. Miguel of Parraces chapel in Villoslada.

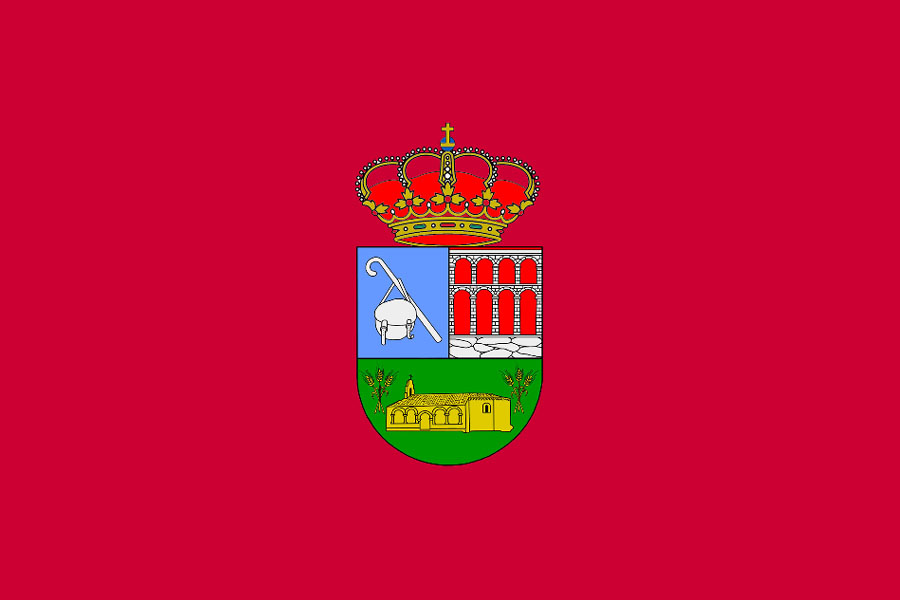
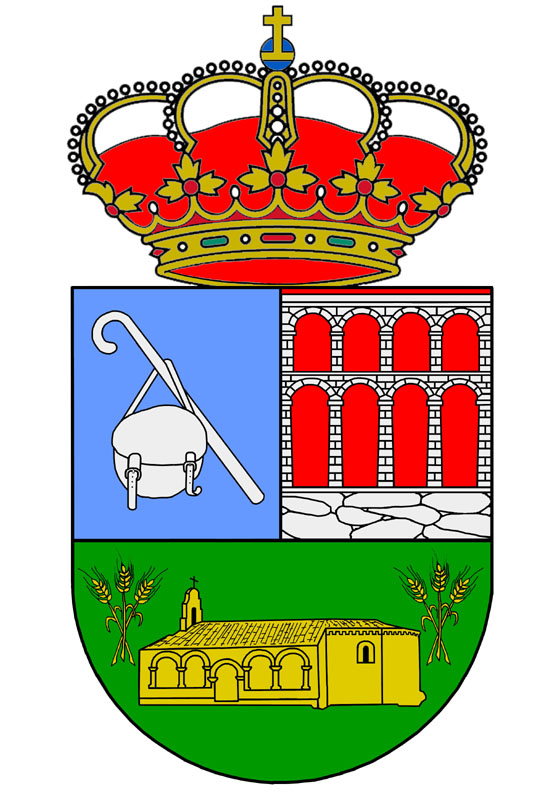
- Flag Coat of arms

- Location of Villoslada. Villoslada (Castile and León)
- Coordinates: 40°59′19″N 4°25′20″W
- Country: Spain
- Community: Castile and León
- Province: Segovia

Government
  - Mayor: Esteban Martín Tejedor

Population (2023)
  - Total: 43
- Time zone: UTC+1 (CET)
  - Summer (DST): UTC+2 (CEST)
- Postal code: 40449
- Website: www.elmvilloslada.es

Villoslada is a village located in Santa María la Real de Nieva in the province of Segovia in Castilla y Leon, Spain.

== Context ==
Villoslada is the head of the "Sexmo of the Trinity" in the "Commonwealth and Land of Segovia", which is also known as "Villoslada of the Trinity". It includes, in addition to the place of its name, the hamlet of San Miguel and the outback of Elmore (or Ermoro). It belongs to the party of judicial Santa Maria la Real de Nieva, to which was united as a dependent district for a few years until the recognition of their autonomy as a minor local entity.

== Local economy ==
Villoslada is basically a grain producer, as well as a producer of sunflowers and some other minor crops. In the past it bred sheep, cattle and pigs.

== Festivals ==
Villoslada celebrates the festival of its patron saint, San Miguel, the second weekend in May, although the parish patron is San Nicolas de Bari (celebrated December 6). It also holds a San Roque festival on August 16.

== Heritage ==
Among its monuments are the Chapel of San Miguel de Párraces, a Romanesque church built in the 12th and 13th centuries, catalogued as a national monument, it holds an interesting Romanesque Christ sculpture from the same period known as "Holy Christ". Also there are the Parish Church of St. Nicholas and the remains of an ancient shrine known as The Holy Land.
