= Nuestra Señora de la Soterraña =

Church in Segovia, Spain

Monasterio de Nuestra Señora de la Soterraña
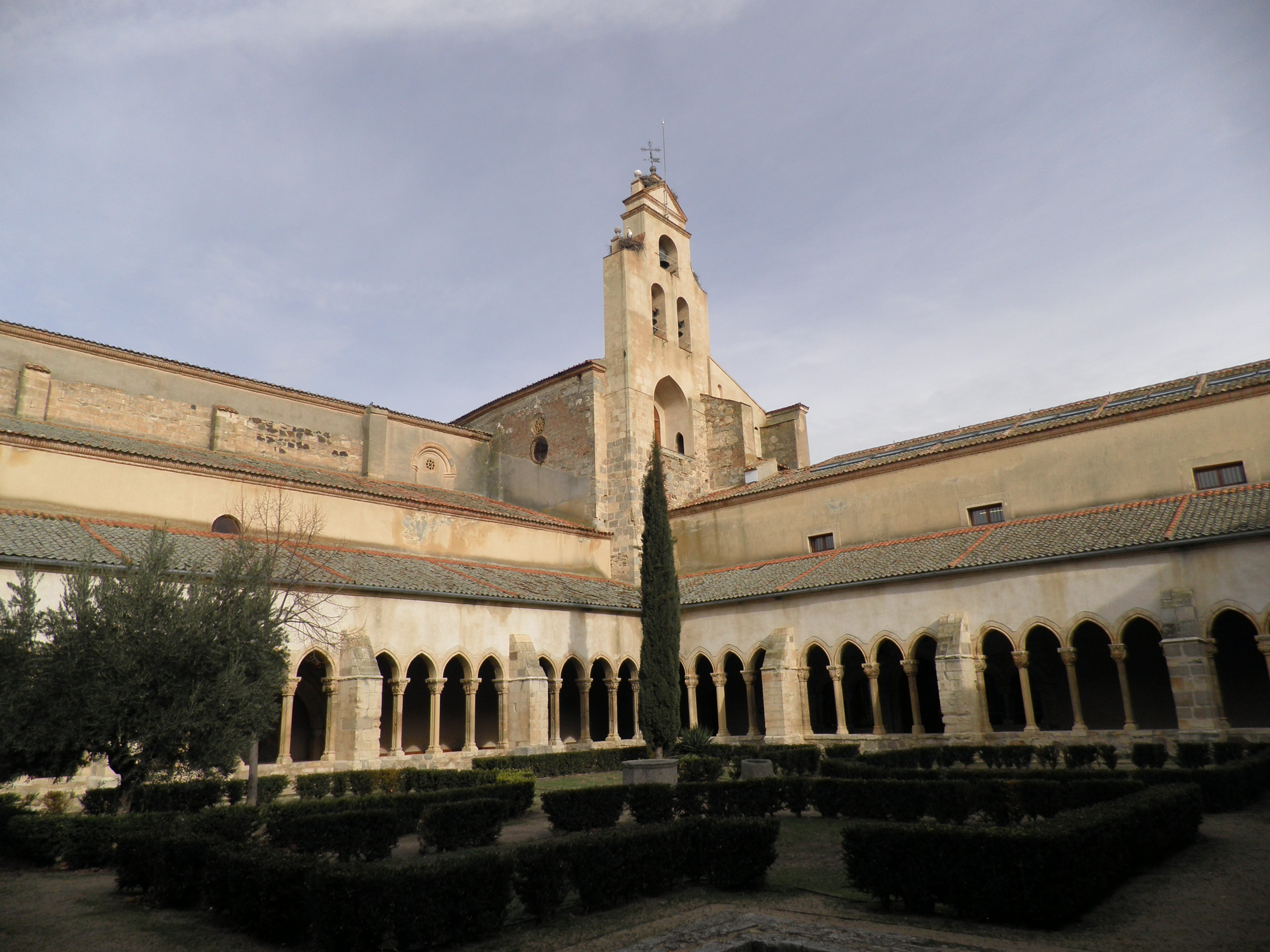

Religion
- Affiliation: Roman Catholic
- Diocese: Diocese of Segovia
- Province: Province of Segovia
- Status: Active (as church)

Location
- Location: Santa María la Real de Nieva, Spain
- Interactive map of Monasterio de Nuestra Señora de la Soterraña
- Coordinates: 41.070139°N 4.406472°W

Architecture
- Type: Monastery
- Style: Gothic
- Groundbreaking: 1393
- Completed: 1432
- Direction of façade: North

Nuestra Señora de la Soterraña Spanish pronunciation: [ˈnwestɾa seˈɲoɾa ðe la soteˈraɲa] (Spanish for Our Lady of Soterraña) is a Gothic church and monastery located at Santa María la Real de Nieva, Province of Segovia, Spain. It was built between late 14th and early 15th centuries.

In 1920, two of its elements, the facade and the cloister, were designated as national monuments. Its present designation is Bien de Interés Cultural.

== History ==
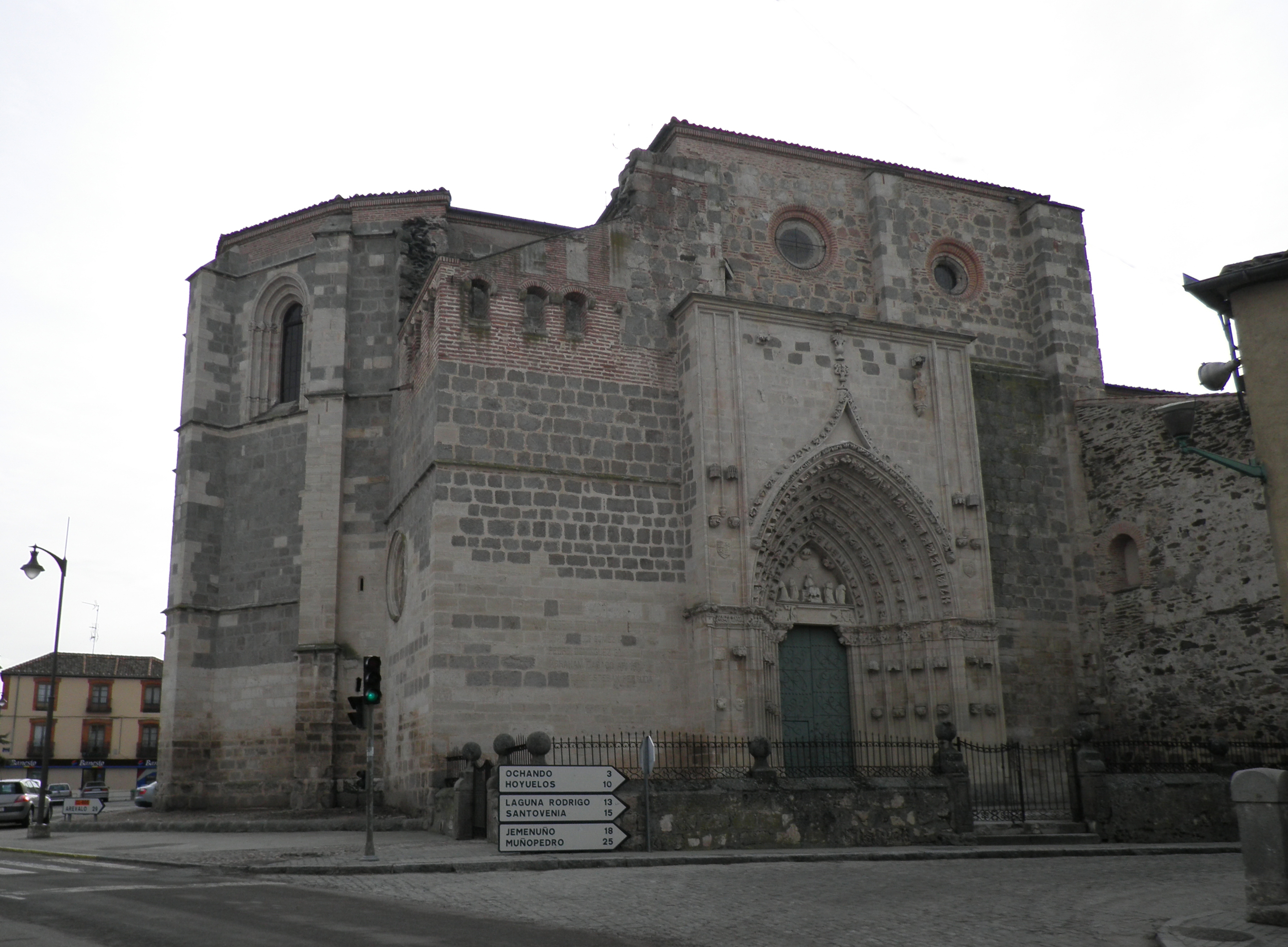
View of northern church front.

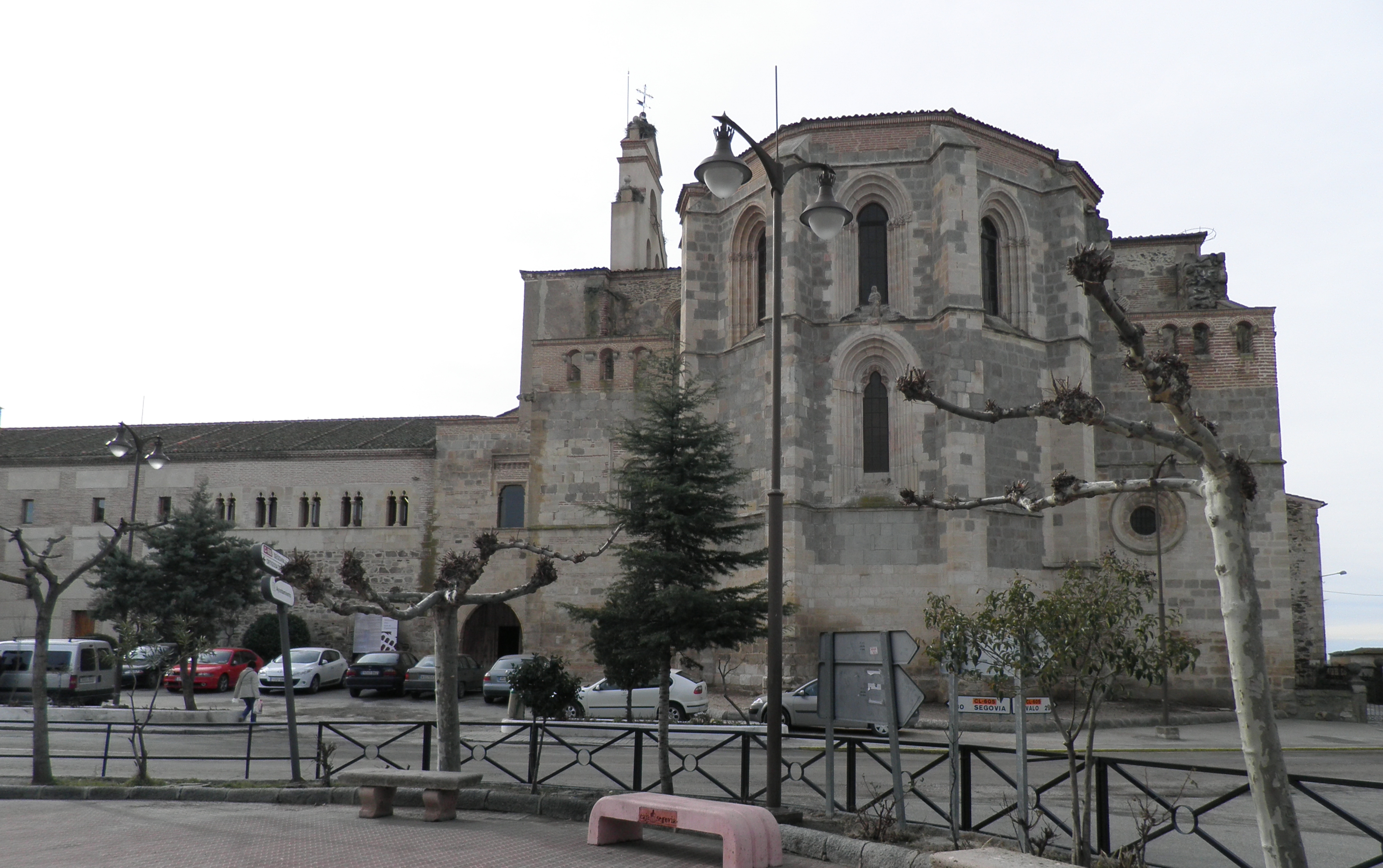
View from Main Square.

In 1392, a wooden sculpture of Mary was discovered buried, probably hidden since the Muslim invasion, in a piece of open ground at the municipality of Nieva, where the village of Santa María de Nieva sits now. This fact was considered a miracle, and the Queen Catherine of Lancaster ordered the building of a sanctuary there and a village around it, to the worship of that Virgin's image, called Soterraña, an old Spanish word that means 'subterranean'. She did it against the opinions of the priest of Nieva, who wanted to bring the image to his village, and nobility of Segovia who preferred moving it to the town. However, the Queen acquired two papal bulls from Clement VII, in February 1393, to release the sanctuary from the Nieva priest's jurisdiction, and getting indulgences for the visitors on certain days.

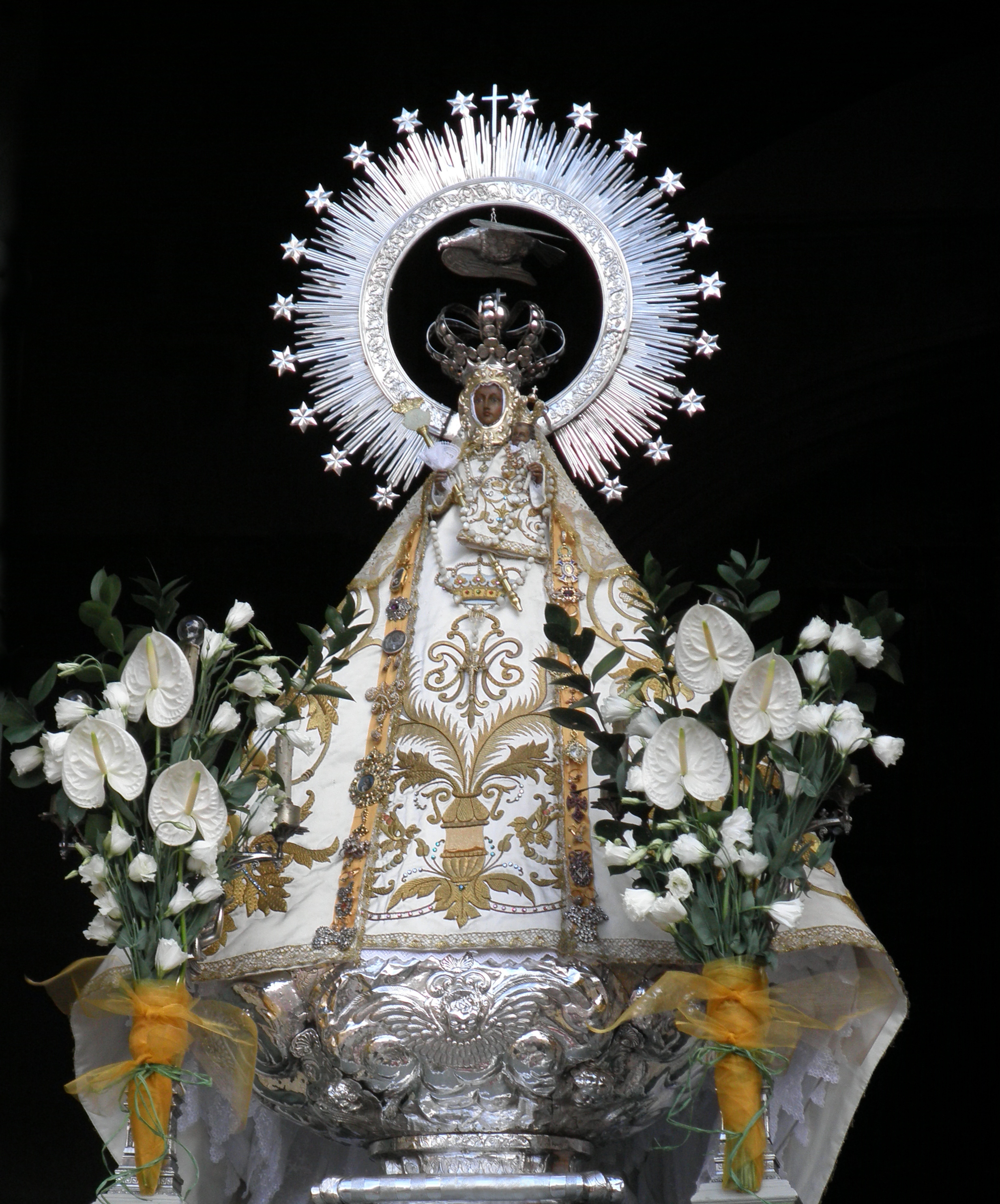
Present Our Lady of Soterraña image. The original one burned in the 19th century.

=== Original church construction (1393-1399) ===
Queen Catherine defrayed a large part of the building with Crown funds, many worshipers also contributed with their own money for the works, and these contributions were increased by two new bulls of Pope Benedict XII, in 1395, giving indulgences to those who gave money for the construction.

The original church was rectangular, divided into three naves, and faced towards East as was traditional in that time. The every-day door was at the northern wall, and there was another door at western wall used just on holy days.

On February 2, 1399, at Toledo, the Queen gave the custody of the image and the temple to the Dominican Order, that officially accepted it on September 7.

=== Enlargement (1414-1432) ===
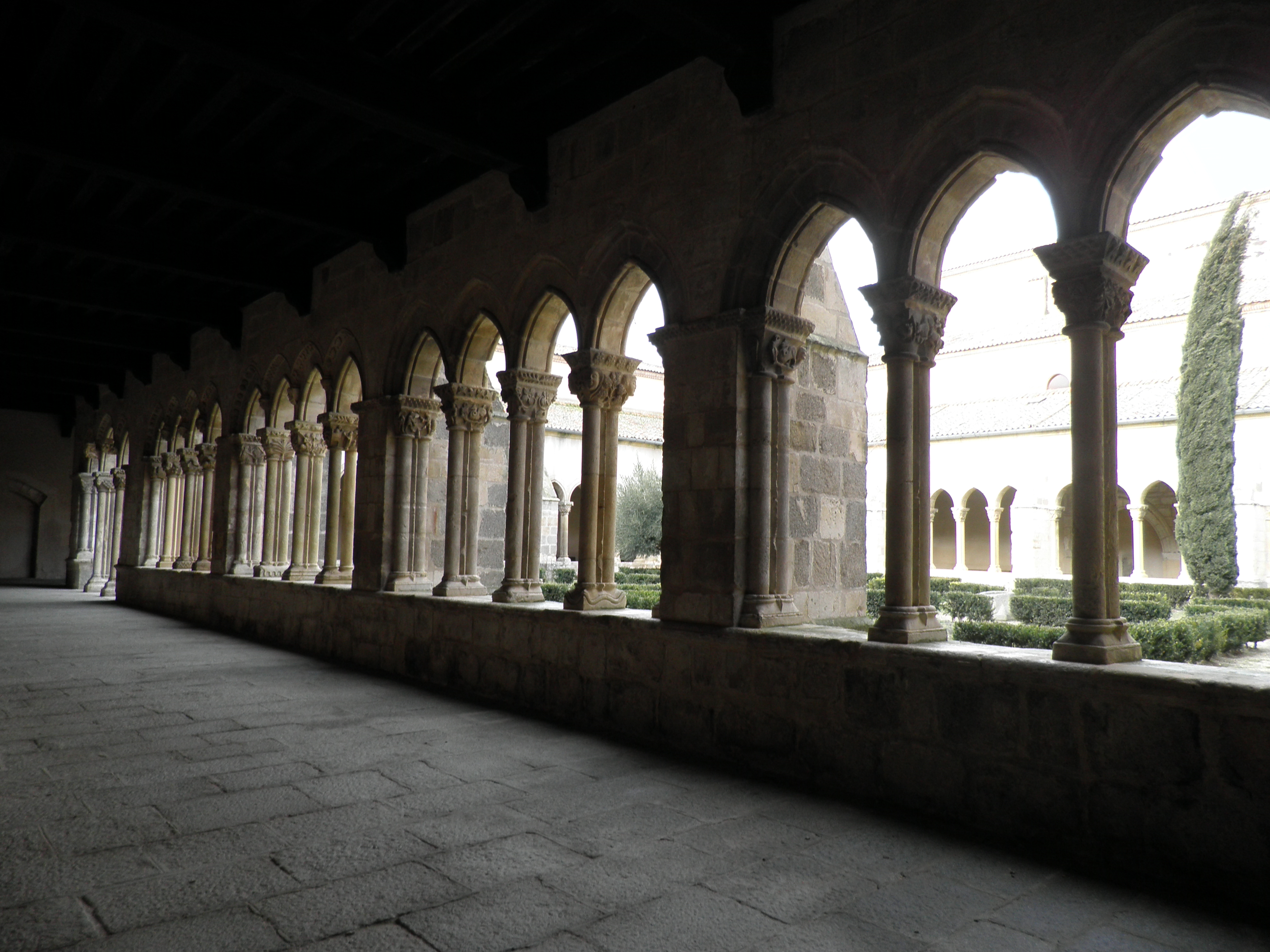
Southern corridor of the cloister.

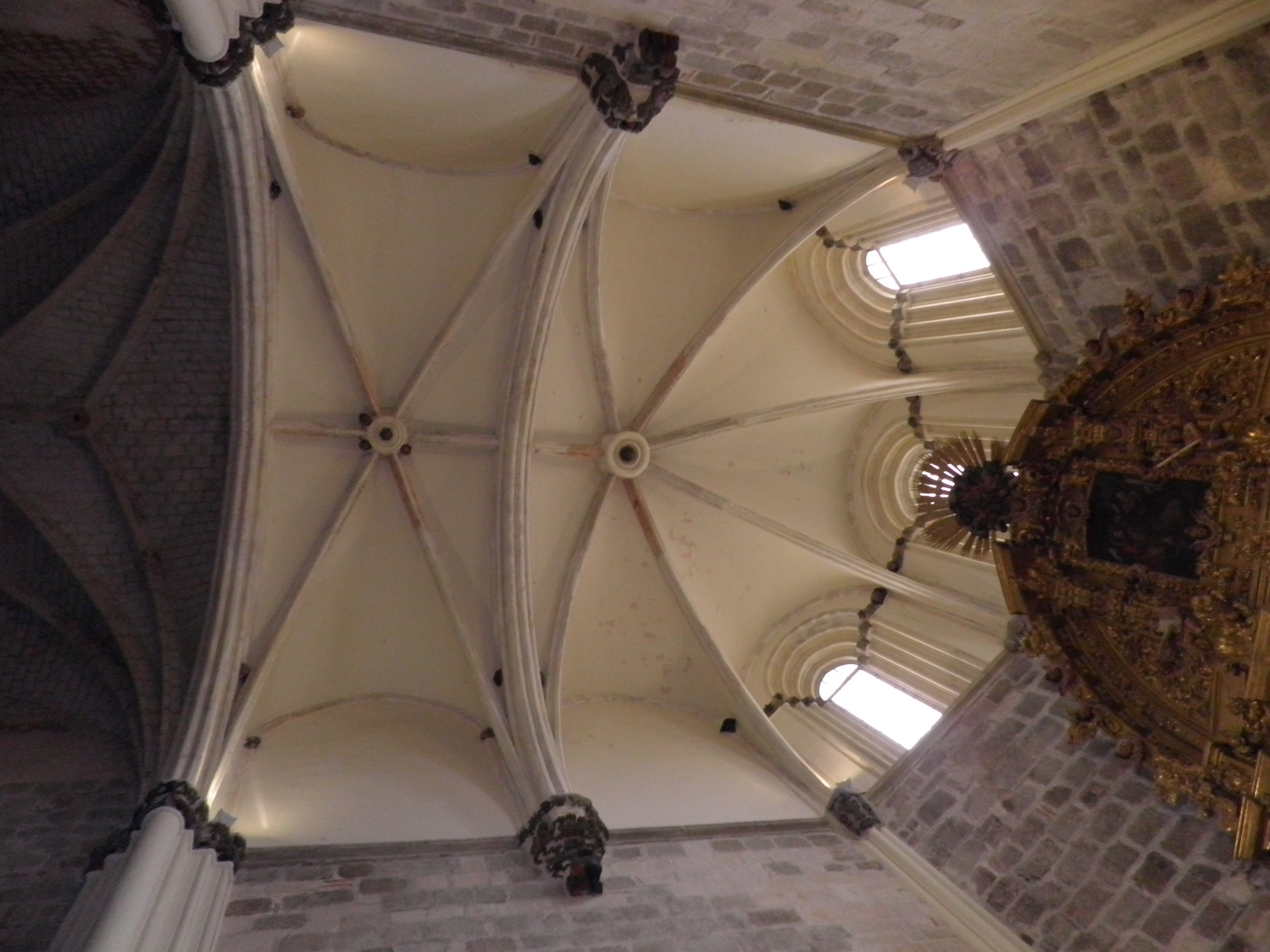
Apse added during the enlargement.

In 1395, Santa María la Real de Nieva village had been founded by Royal order. The number of inhabitants grew quickly along with the number of visitor, and so the need for enlargement. Work started on January 23, 1414, and ended in 1432. These dates are known by three inscriptions located on church transept columns. In this extension of the church, another nave was added along with a transept and an apse, in parallel with the construction of the monastery attached.

Queen Catherine of Lancaster sponsored these works until her death in 1418, and her son King John II of Castile continued the task. The next popes, Clement VII, Benedict XIII of Avignon, and Martin V, also contributed, giving indulgences to those who donated money for the building. Also, Martin V gave 500 florins of his own fund in 1425.

=== Events ===
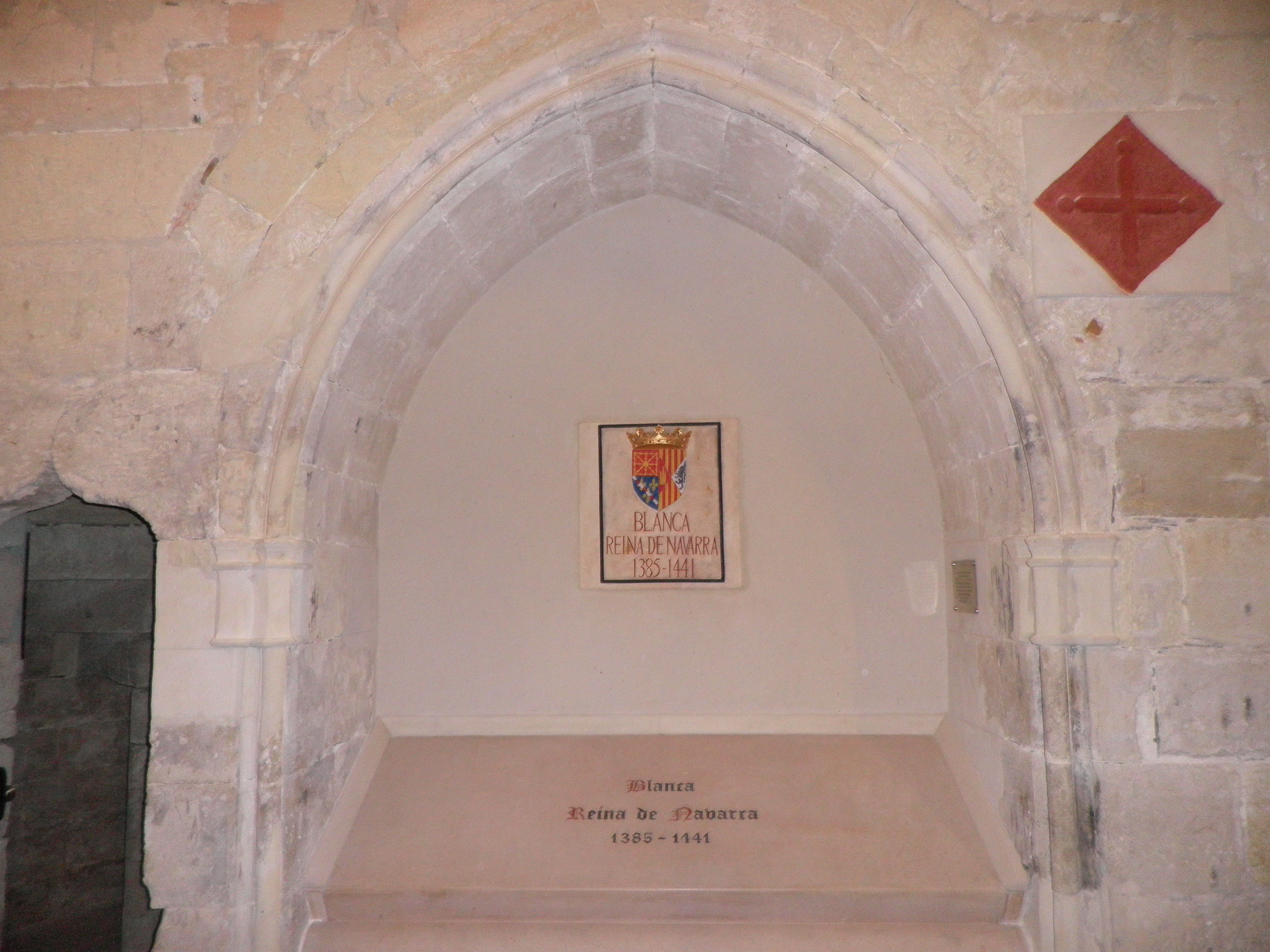
Blanche I of Navarre's tomb.

On April 1, 1441, Queen Blanche I of Navarre was passing by the village on her way to a meeting with Prince Henry, his father King John II of Castile, and King John II of Aragon, when the Queen died, being buried at Nuetra Señora de la Soterraña church's main chapel. Her body stayed there, despite her last wish of resting in Ujué. With time, her location was forgotten until the tomb was discovered during restoration works in 1994.

On October 28, 1473, King Henry IV called a meeting of the Courts of Castile at Our Lady of Soterraña monastery.

After Ecclesiastical Confiscations of Mendizábal, monks left the monastery and its property was divided between the Segovia bishopric and the Santa María la Real de Nieva's Town Hall.

In late 19th century, the monument suffered two fires. The first one, in 1899, affected the southern wing of the monastery and the second was at the high altar of the church.

The monument has been restored a number of times, the façade in 1927 and the cloister in 1929, 1954, and 1976.

== Church ==
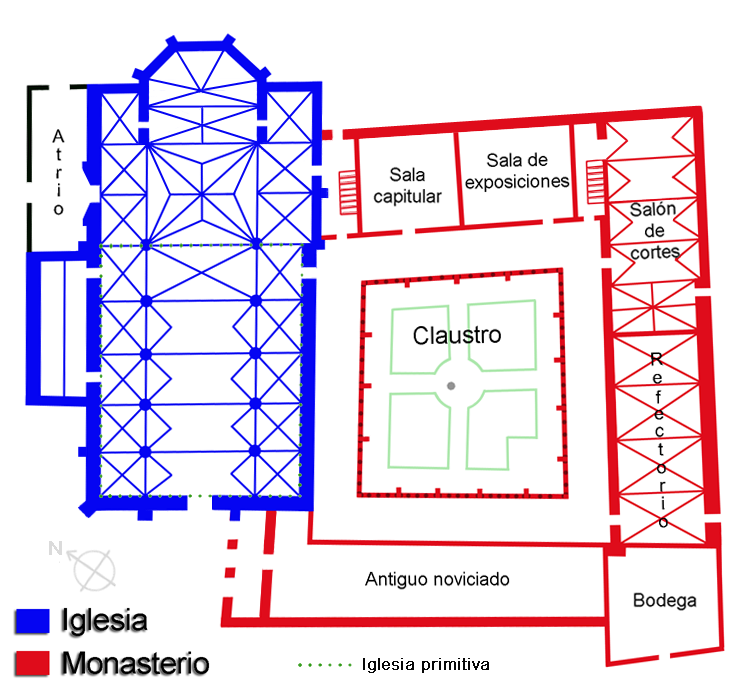
Building plan; church (blue) and monastery (red).

The church was built following early 15th-century Gothic structure canons in Spain. Its decorative style has been described as archaic, because it is influenced by Romanesque art that was present in the Kingdom of Castile until the late 14th century.

The main body of the church consists of three naves, the middle one being wider and higher than the side ones. This structure fits in with the original church. Its slate masonry walls have granite ashlar foundations and corners. However, inside the columns were built using bricks. In the middle there is a small cave where the Virgin's image was found.

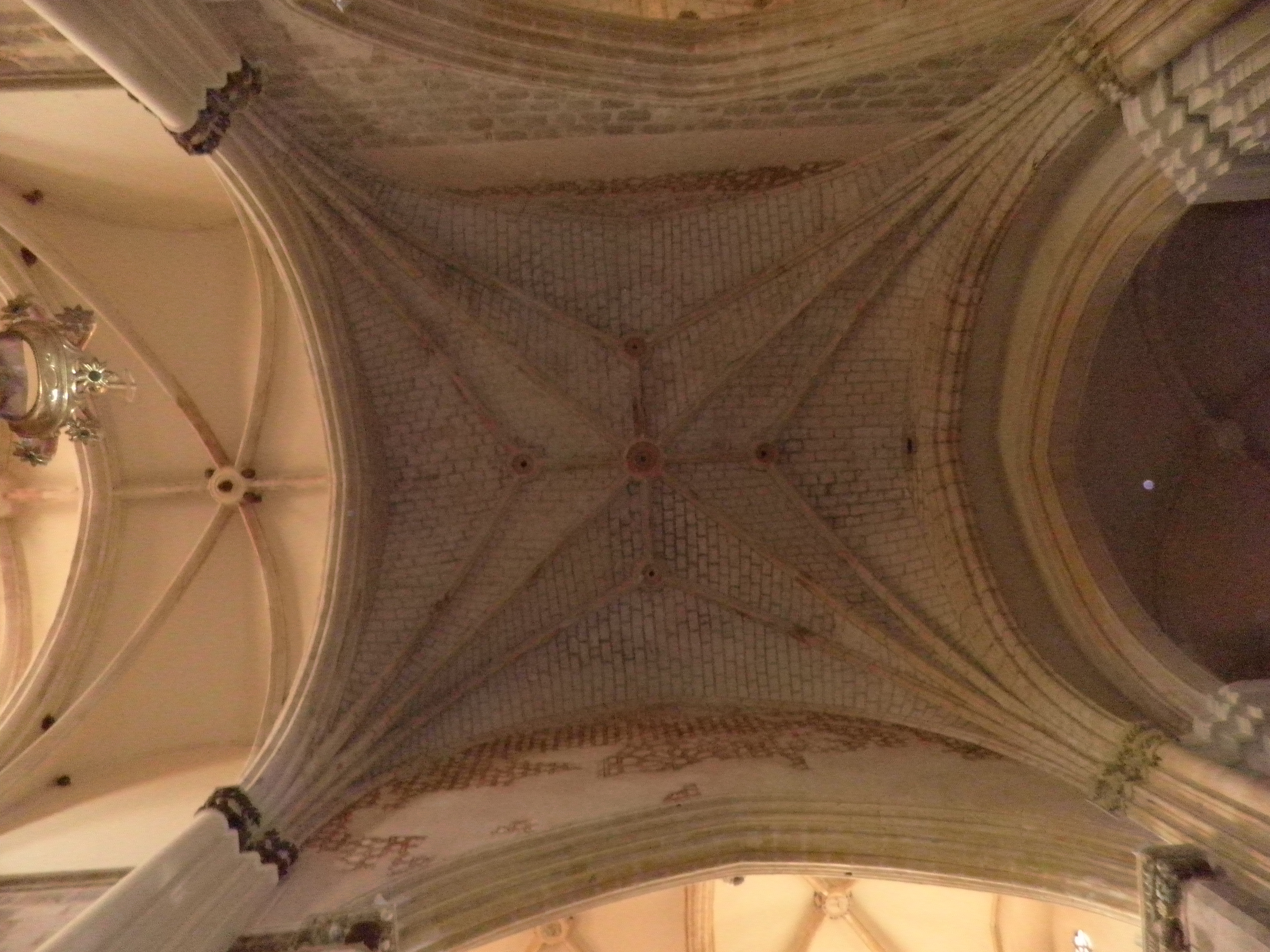
Church transept

Later, another nave, with a transept and one apse with two side chapels, was added. This new part was totally built with ashlar walls. There are mason's marks of 22 different workshops in its walls, that indicates the large number of workers used in the construction. When this part was finished, the old east wall in between was demolished to incorporate the new nave into the building.

In the back central nave, there is a choir loft whose wall are lined with carved wooden chairs. The ceiling under the loft is decorated with a mudéjar wooden coffer.

There is a mural painting of Saint Christopher carrying the child Jesus in the southern wing, discovered during a restoration in 1997.

=== Facade ===
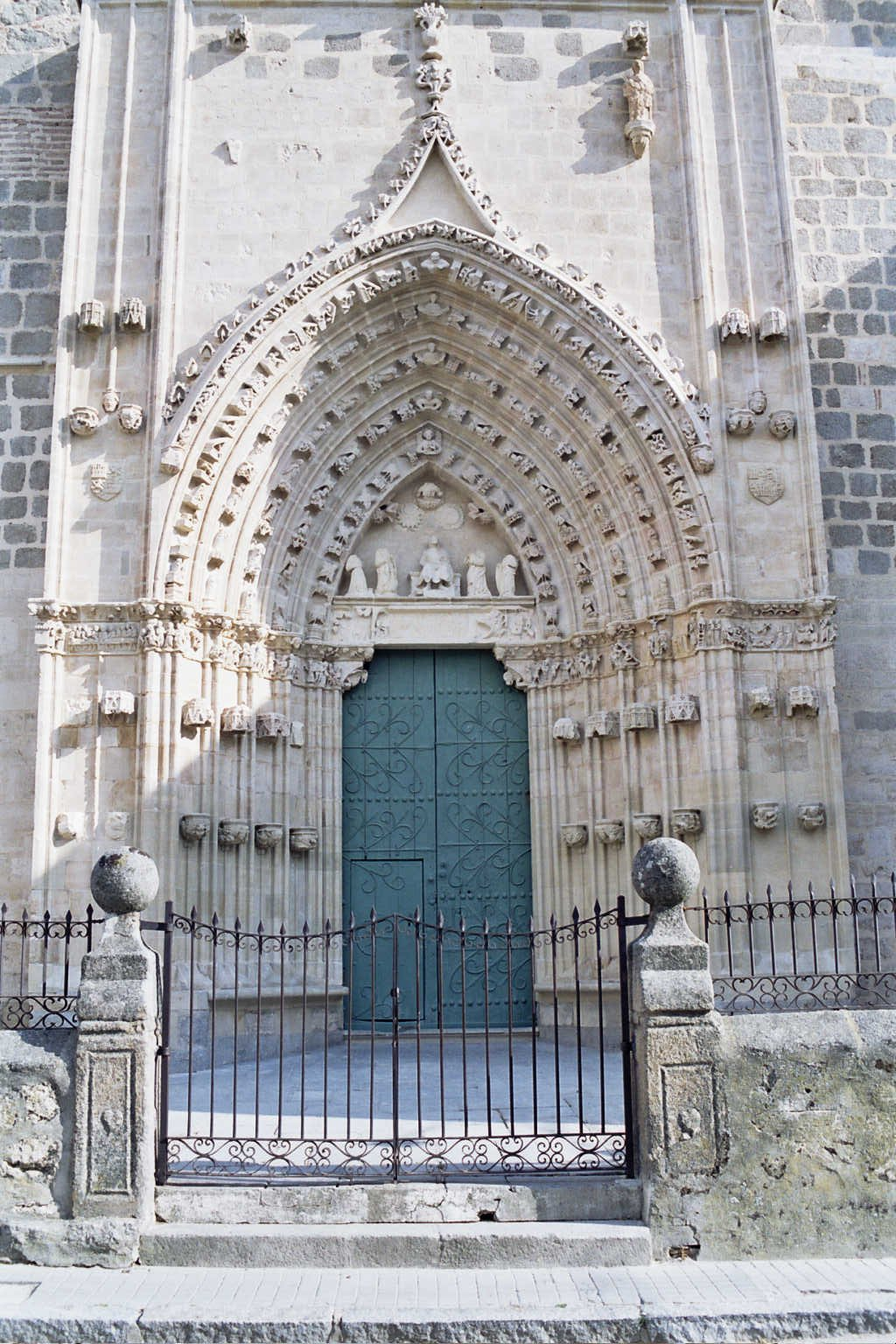
Gothic church facade

The most notable of the church's elements is the facade in the northern wall, opening just under the transept, that is designated as bien de interés cultural itself. It was made in Gothic style with many reliefs and sculptures. It is divided into two bands with an ogival arch. In the upper part, there is a tympanum with an entrenched Christ image, in between two currently beheaded figures, probably the King and Queen that sponsored the building, and two angels. Above there are the Sun and the Moon representing the Universe, and angels on clouds.

The tympanum is surrounded by five archivolts that depict, from outside to inside:

- resurrection of the dead, with 34 figures beside their tombs;
- 16 female saints;
- 14 male saints;
- 12 kneeling archangels with torches;
- 10 seraphs guarding the tympanum's Christ.

The lintel over the door had three carved slabs, but the central one that depicted the Last Judgment is lost. The right slab depicts Hell into whose fish-mouth-shaped entrance persons enter. The left one depicts Heaven with Saint Peter in its gate receiving another person. This slab is held with two corbels with allegorical figures. The left one is a griffin, as a symbol of evil, carrying a hare that represents sin. And the right cobel is lion-shaped, as a symbol of goodness, protecting a naked woman with its paws, that depicts concupiscence.

Under the facade arch there are many scenes depicting the Passion.

== Monastery ==
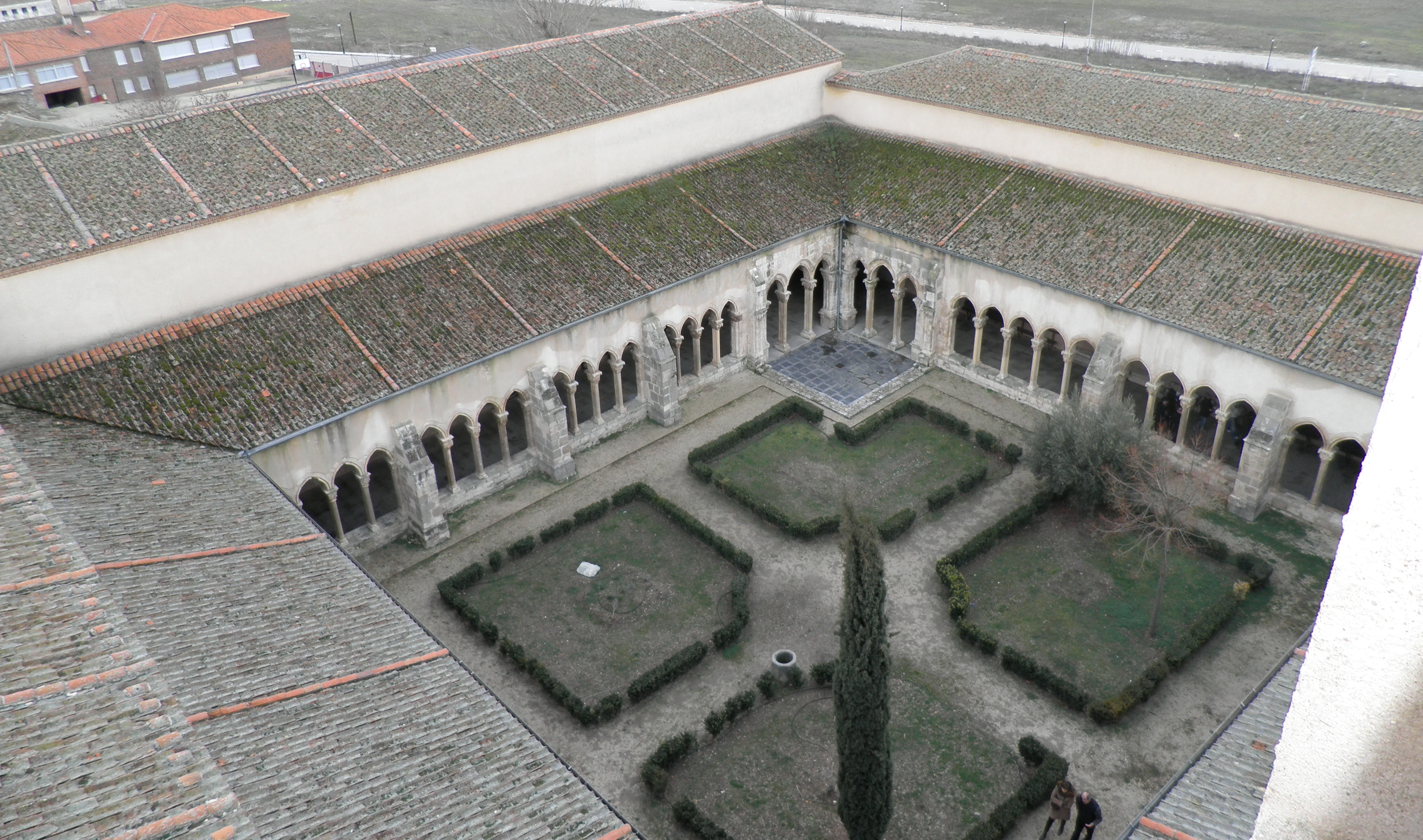
Cloister view from bell tower.

All the monastery rooms are placed around its cloister and open to it. In the eastern wing there are a chapter house, currently used as an exhibition room and the Queen's dormitory on the second floor, that is a library at present. In the southern wing there is the Court Hall, where King Henry IV called a meeting of the Courts of Castile in 1473, next to the refectory. Under the refectory, there is a subterranean warehouse.

There was a fire in the southern wing of old monastery on December 6, 1899, that destroyed some of the old rooms – another smaller cloister, the library, stables and barns, that were not reconstructed, and later that piece of land was sold.

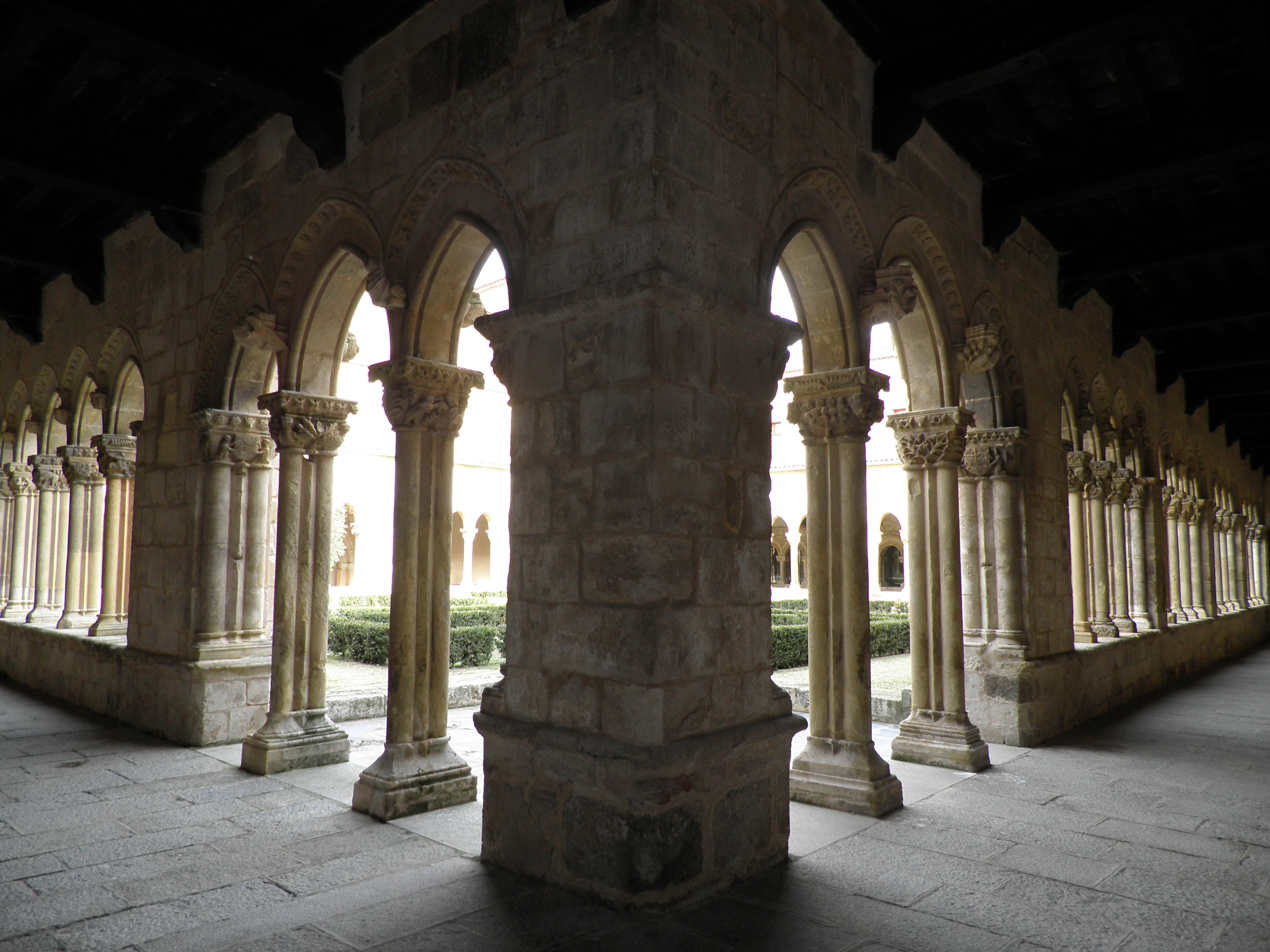
Arches of the cloister southern corner.

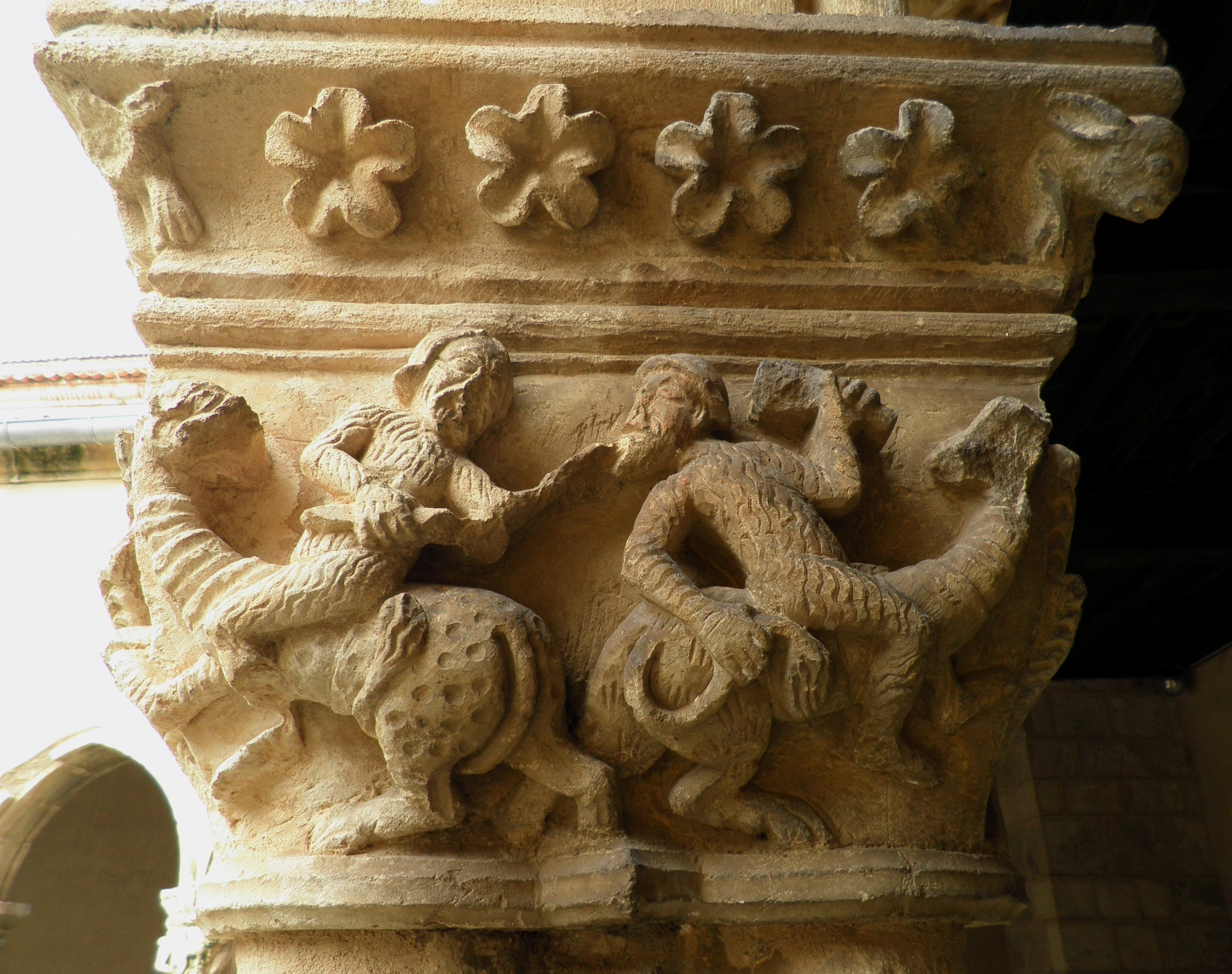
Every cloister capital is decorated in a different way.

=== Cloister ===
The cloister plan is almost square and is attached to the church by its southern wall, where there is a door that connects both sides. The cloister probably was built simultaneously with the church enlargement, as indicated by coincident mason's marks carved in their stones.

There are 17 piers raised on one-yard high, limestone ashlar walls. Between each pair of piers there are groups of 3, 4 or 5 ogival arches, a total of 68. There is no wall in the south-western corner forming a pair of three arch gates to access into the central garden.

The cloister structure is held by 11 big buttresses, and two smaller ones placed in its entrance.

Each column is carved in a sole piece as two cylinders linked by a bevel withstanding a capital decorated with reliefs. Every capital is decorated in a different way. Unlike the facade, cloister capitals have very few biblical depictions. The main themes used in their decoration are scenes of the Middle Age monks and people's way of life, nature, monsters, and coats of arms.

== See also ==
- Our Lady of Soterraña de Nieva, an ivory Marian image venerated in the Philippines

== Bibliography ==
- (in Spanish) Antonio Sánchez Sierra (1992), El monasterio de Santa María la Real de Nieva. ISBN 84-7231-802-8
- (in Spanish) A. Sánchez Sierra y A. R. Esteban, Guía del Monasterio de Santa María la Real de Nieva. Ed. Palgraf S. L.
- (in Spanish) A. M. Yurami y A. Sánchez Sierra (1995), Historia de la Aparición de la Taumaturga Ymagen de nuestra Señora de la Soterraña de Nieva. ISBN 84-605-3511-8
- (in Spanish) Carlos Arnaz Ruiz (1972), Santa Mª la Real de Nieva. Ed. Ayuntamiento de Sª Mª la Real de Nieva.
