= Almazul =

- Municipality
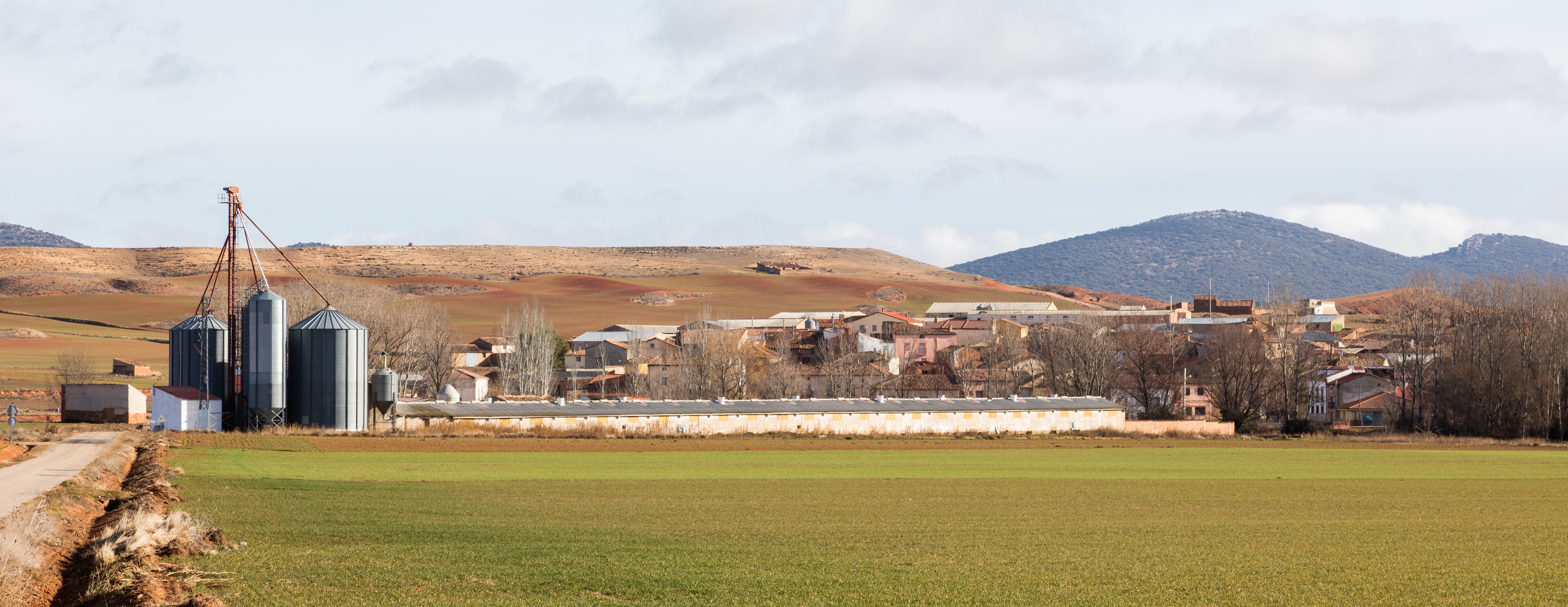
- Almazul

- Location in Spain. Almazul (Spain)
- Country: Spain
- Autonomous Community: Castile and León
- Province: Soria
- Comarca: Gómara
- Distritos: List: Almazul; Zarabes; Mazaterón

Government
  - Type: Ayuntamiento
  - Mayor: Félix López García (PP)

Area
  - Total: 67.86 km^{2} (26.20 sq mi)
- Elevation: 199 m (653 ft)

Population (2025-01-01)
  - Total: 61
  - Density: 0.90/km^{2} (2.3/sq mi)
- Time zone: UTC+1 (CET)
  - Summer (DST): UTC+2 (CEST)
- Postcode: 42126
- ISO 3166 code: ES-Z
- Website: Official website

Almazul is a municipality located in the province of Soria, in the autonomous community of Castile and León, Spain. Its current name comes from Arabic to al Mahsul, a name that refers to the vertical movement of water due to the birth of the river Henar in this county.

Celebrates local festival in honor of the La Virgen de la Blanca on May 27.

== Geography ==
Almazul is located on a gentle slope and is 981 meters high above sea level.

Bordered by the terms of Mazaterón Zárabes Gómara Ledesma of Soria and Villaseca de Arciel.

== Weather ==
Almazul has a Mediterranean climate, with long, cold winters and short, warm summers.

Prediction by localities, Almazul. State Agency for Meteorology.

== Administration ==
The municipality of Almazul integrates itself Almazul term and Zarabes and Mazaterón that were annexed in 1900 and 1975 respectively.

== Area and population ==
It has an area 67.86 km^{2}, population of 114 inhabitants, of whom 60 are men and 54 women. The density is 1.68 inhabitants per square kilometer.

Historical population
Year	Pop.	±%
1900	467	—
1910	529	+13.3%
1920	508	−4.0%
1930	532	+4.7%
1940	545	+2.4%
1960	430	−21.1%
1970	436	+1.4%
1986	252	−42.2%
1990	238	−5.6%
1995	205	−13.9%
2000	167	−18.5%
2005	131	−21.6%
2006	121	−7.6%
2007	114	−5.8%
Source: INE

== Celebrations ==
=== La Virgen de la Blanca ===
Patron of Almazul, takes place on May 27. It is the biggest feast.

=== Festivities in honor of San Roque ===
They are the most popular and festivals are held in honor of the patron saint of Almazul. Traditionally worship this holy French after each summer harvest in recognition of the work done during the year.

They start at 00:00 hours the night of 15 to 16 each month of August with the chupinazo that is launched from the council after which attaches the stake that had been installed in the main square of the village.
