= Charles Eloi Demarquet =

French military officer

Charles Eloi Demarquet (June 13, 1796 – February 26, 1870) was one of the principal aides-de-camp of Simón Bolívar (the first name is sometimes given only as "Eloy" or "Eloi").

Originally a French officer, he fought for Napoleon, probably at Waterloo, and may have lost three fingers in that battle. He joined Bolivar early enough to have been one of the principal figures mentioned at the Battle of Carabobo. In Ecuador, he made friends with Jean-Baptiste Boussingault, who later became a famous chemist and left memoirs which describe both his time in South America in general and his relations with Demarquet in particular:

I had been very close to Demarquet (Eloi), whom I had known in Quito, where he was married. ... It was in Jamaica that he met Bolivar, after he [Bolivar] was obliged to leave, having been defeated at Cartagena by Morillo's troops. It was there that Bolivar recruited several French military men who were to follow him when he returned to Venezuela.

Demarquet became his first aide de camp, he fought all the wars of independence, starting in 1816 or 1817, he accompanied the Liberator in the Peru campaign...

Demarquet was an honest man in every sense of the word. In the course of his difficult and dangerous career, he suffered much in the milieu in which circumstances obliged him to live; he had an enchanting good humor, which did not exclude a great sensitivity.

(Note that "first aide de camp" here refers to rank, not chronology – chronologically, Ibarra and O'Leary were Bolivar's first aides-de-camp.)

From early on, he was promoted regularly until attaining the rank of Colonel (in 1829). By July 26, 1822, he was already close enough to Bolivar to be one of the few people present at the Guayaquil conference, when Bolivar and José de San Martín met. According to Lafond de Lurcy, he acted as Bolivar's secretary on that occasion.

In 1823, he became engaged to Manuela Fernandez-Salvador and Gomez de la Torre, daughter of the prominent jurist José Fernández Salvador, married her then or soon after and settled in Quito. The bride's father was also a close associate of Bolívar.

During the repression of the uprising of Pasto (1823), he signed numerous orders on Bolivar's behalf. He appears to have been one of the principal agents working for support of Bolivar as a dictator, notably in 1826. When Bolivar's mistress Manuela Sáenz took a perilous journey from Quito to Bogota (12/1827-1/1828), he served as her escort. During the Colombian-Peruvian conflict over Guayaquil, he served as Bolivar's representative to the Peruvian government (1829). Bolivar subsequently recommended him for the Holland legation, but Bolivar's resignation and then death (1830) prevented further action on this.

Boussingualt: "Before the death of general Bolivar, he had already left service, did business in Quito, Lima, Choco, earned a good enough fortune and came to live in Paris, with his family...".

After Bolivar's death, Demarquet served General Florès (the first leader of the new nation of Ecuador) for some time before again retiring. He subsequently went into (or exclusively engaged in) business but also served Ecuador again in its conflicts with Florès. He ended his days in Paris and died there on February 27, 1870. He is buried in Père Lachaise Cemetery.

Demarquet, though less known today than other of Bolivar's associates, was closely identified with him at the time and his character was praised as honest, faithful and dependable by a variety of sources, among them Bolivar, Florès, Boussingault, and Lafond de Lurcy.

Among his notable descendants are his own oldest son, Carlos, an Ecuadorian politician who served as Quito's cantonal leader (Jefe Politico) from 1886 to 1892, and the French historian and Academician Jean-Jacques Chevallier.
