= Jean-Jacques Chevallier =

Jean-Jacques Chevallier, (February 15, 1900 – May 23, 1983), was a 20th-century French professor, jurist and historian and Academician. Professor at the Paris Faculty of Law and Economic Sciences, member of the Academy of Political and Moral Sciences (1964–83), he left numerous works, in particular a major classic on "The Great Political Works from Machiavelli to Our Day" (Les grandes œuvres politiques: de Machiavel à nos jours), recently reissued with an update by Yves Guchet. Several subsequent historians in France have acknowledged his influence; Jean-Pierre Gross writes of "A chronological and historical account, in the tradition established by Jean-Jacques Chevallier", and according to the French jurist Georges Lavau: "We had a few masters who had explored certain territories, almost in solitude: André Siegfried, Raymond Aron, Jean-Jacques Chevallier, Georges Burdeau, Jean Stoetzel."

== Family ==
Joseph Jean-Jacques Chevallier was born in Paris, France, the son of Jeanne Marie Demarquet and Joseph Rogatien Chevallier. His mother was a great-granddaughter of the Ecuadorian jurist José Fernández Salvador and a granddaughter of Charles Eloi Demarquet, one of Bolivar's principal aides-de-camp. His father was a military officer who was ordered to French Indochina the year after his son's birth and left a series of letters on Tonkin (part of what is now Vietnam) and Laos (collected and published in 1995).

He was the father of nine children, including screenwriter and author François Chevallier and food historian Jim Chevallier.

== Education ==
Through his early twenties, he accumulated studies and degrees: from 1918-1921 at the Faculty of Law in Paris; in 1922, at the Institut de Haut Enseignement commercial de Nancy; in 1924 he received a doctorate in political and economic sciences at Nancy; in 1925 he received a doctorate in jurisprudence at Nancy and became a professor of public law (“agrégé de droit public”).

During this same period, he was also a prize-winning athlete: In 1920, he was French University Champion in foot racing, winning the 400m, and again in 1921, winning the 100m, 400m and 400m high jump; that year, he also won the 200m in the France-Switzerland athletic international; in 1922, he was again university champion of France in the 100m, 400m, 400m high jump and relay race. In 1924, he was Lorraine champion in the 400m. In 1925 he was again university champion of France in the 400m.

== Career ==
He then began a lifelong career as a professor, starting in 1926 at the Grenoble Faculty of Law (constitutional law and international public law). He remained at this faculty until 1942. Though he was named to the Paris Faculty in 1939, the mobilization of 1939 resulted in this being canceled.

In 1931, he published L'Évolution de l'Empire britannique, his first major work. He continued to publish a long list of well-received books over the years.

In 1943, he became a professor at the Paris Faculty of Law until retiring in October 1970. Originally he taught constitutional law; from 1957 he held the chair of the doctorate of the history of political ideas. From 1943 to 1967, he was also professor at the Ecole Libre des Sciences Politiques, then the Institute of Political Studies of Paris (Institut d'études politiques de Paris)- known familiarly as "Sciences Po". From 1951 to 1956 he also taught constitutional law at the Hautes Études Commerciales (HEC).

From 1950 to 1951 and from 1951 to 1952, he was at the Institute for Advanced Study in Princeton, New Jersey.

On March 2, 1964, he became a member of the Institut de France in the Académie des Sciences Morales et Politiques, and in 1972 became the academy's president.

== Selected works ==
- Barnave: ou, Les deux faces de la Révolution, Presses Universitaires de Grenoble, 1979, 366 pp. ISBN 2-7061-0161-X
- Histoire de la pensée politique, Paris: Payot, 2006, 895 p. ISBN 2-228-90127-X
- Histoire des institutions et des régimes politiques de la France de 1789 à nos jours, Dalloz, 1991 (8^{e} éd.), 1028 pp. ISBN 2-247-01183-7
- Histoire des institutions et des régimes politiques de la France de 1789 à 1958, Paris: Colin, 2001 (9^{e} éd.), 748 pp. ISBN 2-247-03824-7
- La Société des Nations britanniques (Académie de droit international de La Haye), Librairie du Recueil Sirey, Paris, 1939, 113 pp.
- L'Évolution de l'Empire britannique, Paris: Éditions Internationales, 1930, 1068 pp. 2 vols
- with Mario Albertini, Pierre Armaud, Henri Buch, L'Idée de nation, Paris: Presses Universitaires de France, 1969, 232 pp.
- with Yves Guchet, Les grandes œuvres politiques: de Machiavel à nos jours, Paris: Colin, Collection « U », 2001 (new ed.), 303 pp. ISBN 2-200-26179-9
- Chevallier, Jean-Jacques; Guy Carcassonne; Olivier Duhamel (2017). Histoire de la V^{e} République: 1958 - 2017 (in French) (16th ed.). Paris: Dalloz. ISBN 978-2247169221.
