= Santa María la Real de Nieva =

- Municipality
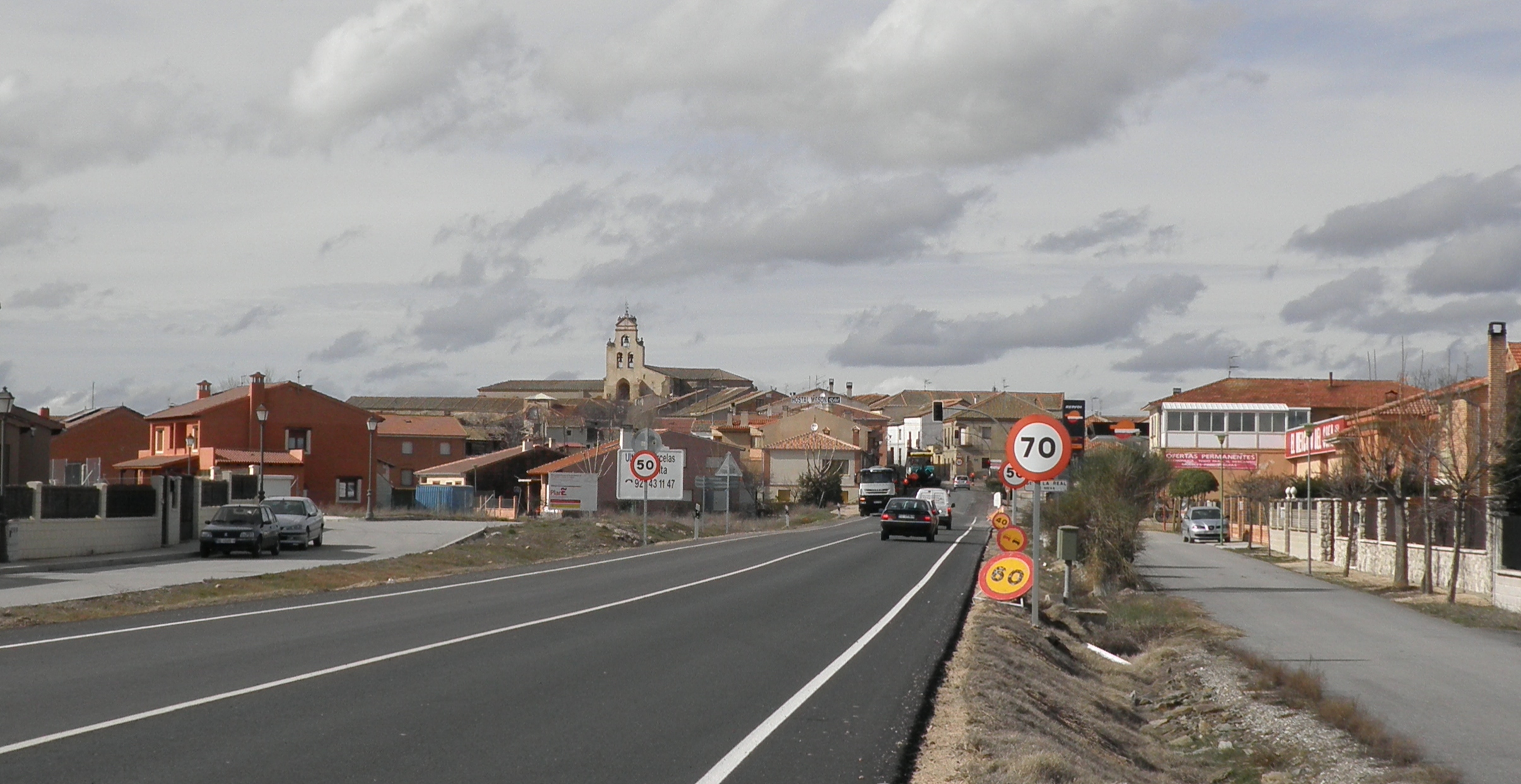

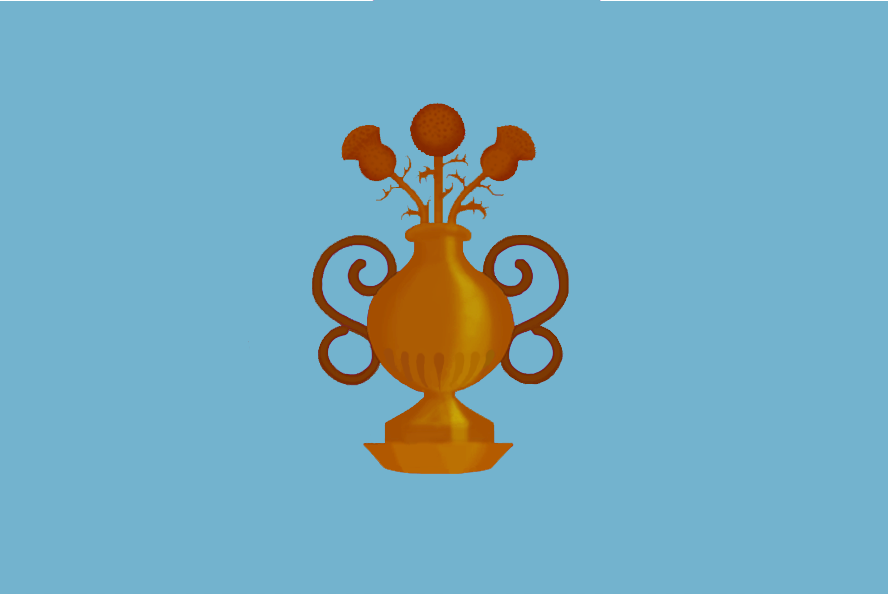
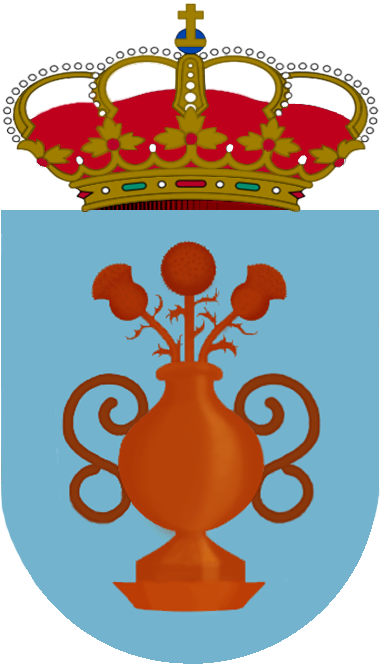
- Flag Coat of arms

- Location in Spain. Santa María la Real de Nieva (Spain)
- Coordinates: 41°04′14″N 4°24′23″W
- Country: Spain
- Autonomous community: Castile and León
- Province: Segovia
- Municipality: Santa María la Real de Nieva

Area
  - Total: 198 km^{2} (76 sq mi)
- Elevation: 907 m (2,976 ft)

Population (2025-01-01)
  - Total: 906
  - Density: 4.58/km^{2} (11.9/sq mi)
- Time zone: UTC+1 (CET)
  - Summer (DST): UTC+2 (CEST)
- Website: Official website

Santa María la Real de Nieva is a municipality located in the province of Segovia, Castile and León, Spain, about 30 km (18 mi) northwest of Segovia town. According to the 2010 census (INE), the municipality had a population of 1,193 inhabitants.

== Villages ==
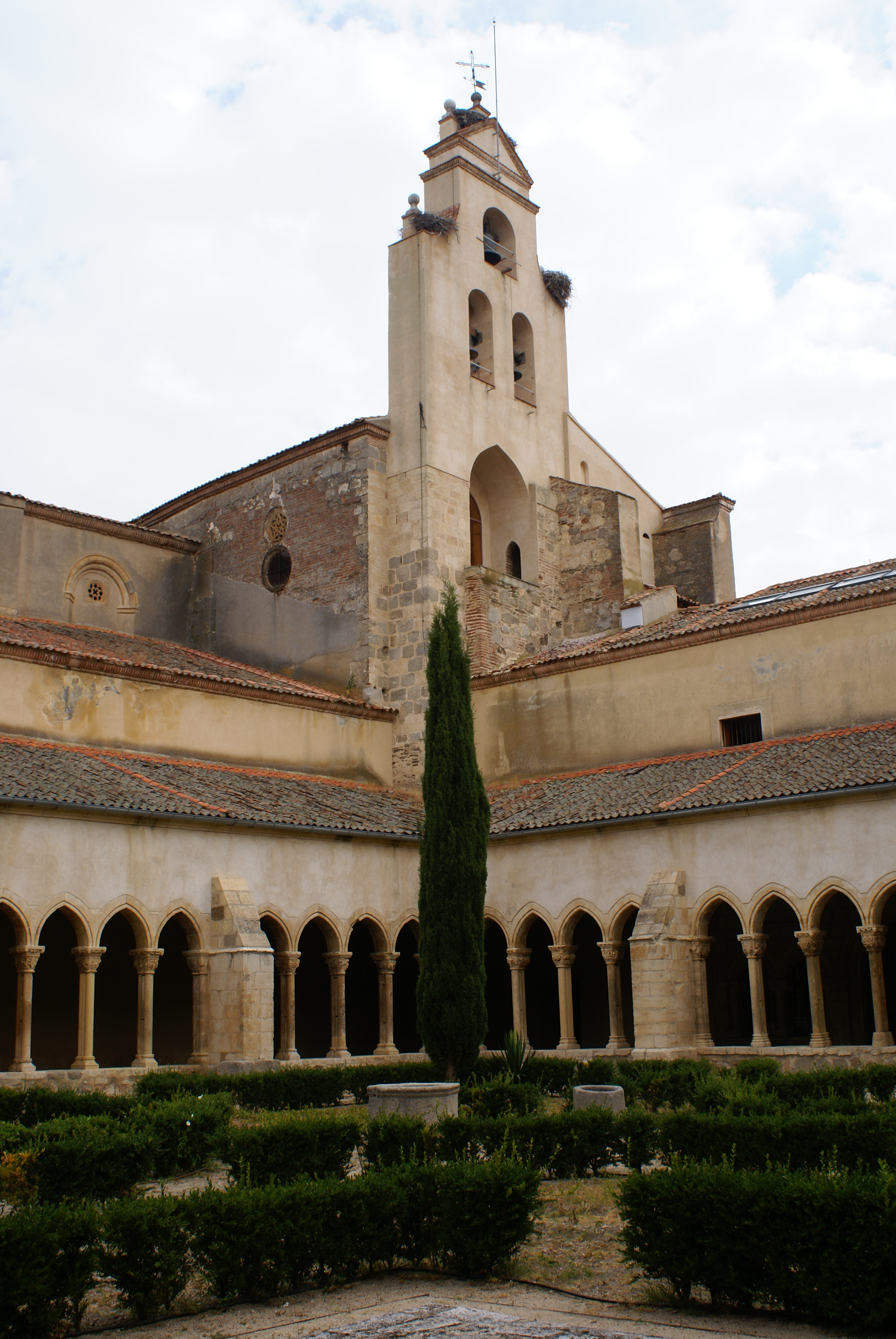
View of Our Lady of Soterraña Monastery's cloister at Santa Maria la Real de Nieva.

This municipality includes 14 villages:

- Aragoneses
- Balisa
- Hoyuelos
- Jemenuño
- Laguna Rodrigo
- Miguel Ibáñez
- Ochando
- Paradinas
- Pascuales
- Pinilla-Ambroz
- Santa María la Real de Nieva
- Santovenia
- Tabladillo
- Villoslada

== The History ==
All its villages, except Santa María la Real de Nieva village, were repopulated in the 11th century after the region's Reconquista, during the reign of Alfonso VI of León and Castile. Santa María la Real de Nieva village was founded in 1395 by King Henry III, by the mediation of his wife Catherine of Lancaster. The town's founding was due to the finding of a buried wooden sculpture of Mary three years before, probably hidden since muslem invasion, in a piece of open ground where the village is now. This fact was considered a miracle, and the Queen ordered the building of a sanctuary and a village around it, to the worship of this Virgin's image, called Soterraña, an old Spanish word that means 'subterranean'. The Crown proclaimed some privileges to foster the settlement in the village on 1395 and 1407, like tax and conscription exemptions.

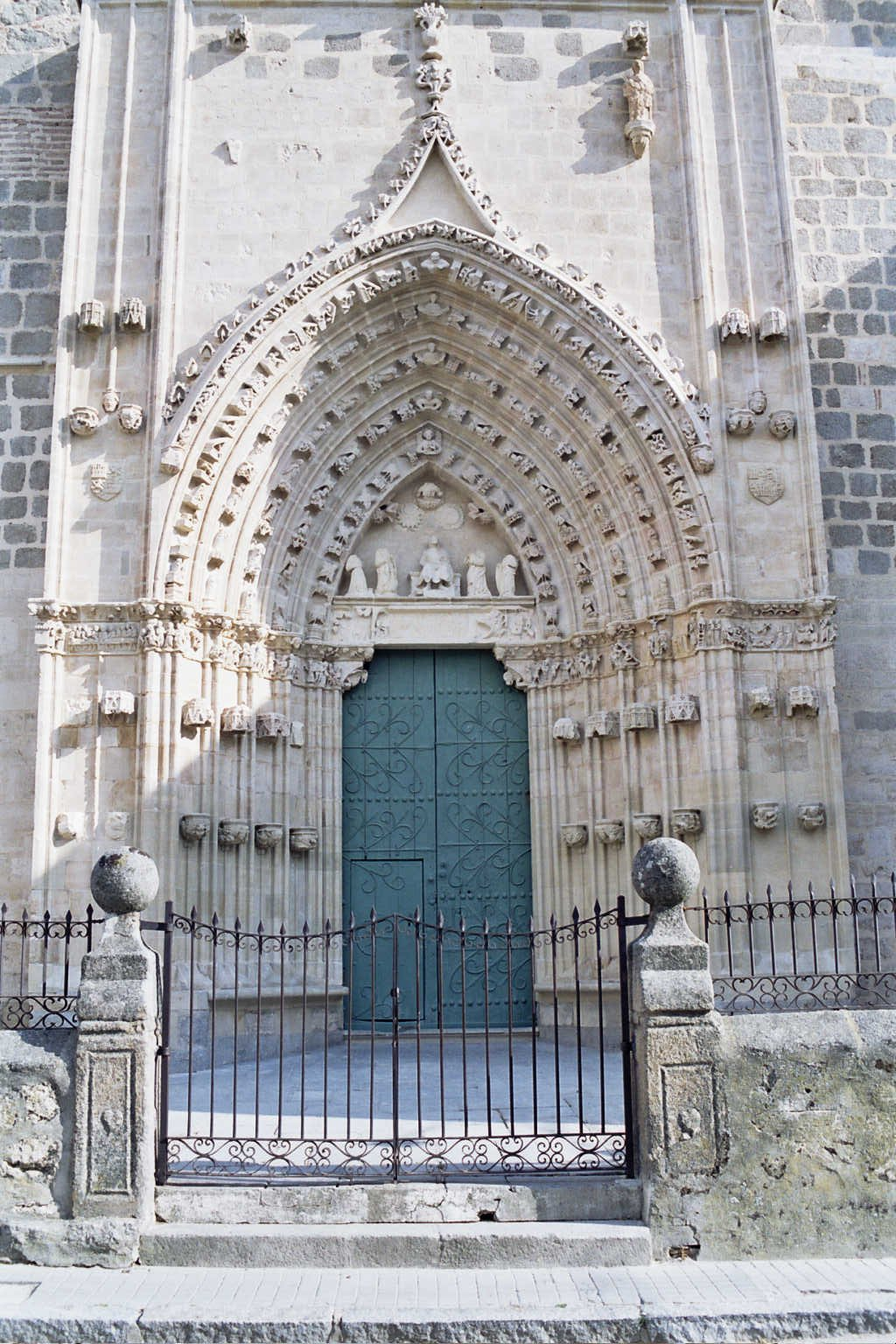
Gothic facade of Our Lady of Soterraña Church.

During her stay in Santa María la Real de Nieva, Queen Blanche I of Navarre died on April 1, 1441, and she was buried at its church.

On October 28, 1473, King Henry IV called a meeting of the Courts of Castile at Santa Maria's monastery.

During the revolt of the Comuneros in 1520, Rodrigo Ronquillo, chief of royal troops in the area, set his headquarters in Santa Maria la Real de Nieva, and lost a battle near the town.

In the 1834 territorial reorganization of Spain, Santa María la Real de Nieva became one of the five legal districts in Province of Segovia.

Santa María la Real de Nieva's municipality grew by the adding of the surrounding villages; Ochando and Pascuales (1965); Aragoneses, Balisa, Hoyuelos, Laguna Rodrigo, Miguel Ibañez, Pinilla-Ambroz, Tabladillo, and Villoslada (1969); Jemenuño, Santovenia, and Paradinas (1970).

== Monuments ==
There are three national monuments in the municipality:

- Monastery of Our Lady of Soterraña, in Santa Maria la Real de Nieva town, is a 15th-century Gothic building notable by its cloister and facade.
- Chapel of Saint Michael, in Villoslada, is a small Romanesque temple built between 12th and 13th centuries.
- Church of Our Lady of Assumption, in Paradinas, is a 16th-century Gothic building with some neoclassical elements.

== Bibliography ==
- (in Spanish) Antonio Miguel Yurami y Antonio Sánchez Sierra (1995), Historia de la aparición de la taumaturga ymagen de nuestra Señora la Soterraña de Nieva. ISBN 84-605-3511-8
- (in Spanish) Antonio Sánchez Sierra (1992), El monasterio de Santa María la Real de Nieva. ISBN 84-7231-802-8
