= El Romeral =

Coordinates: 39.706°N 3.433°W

- municipality
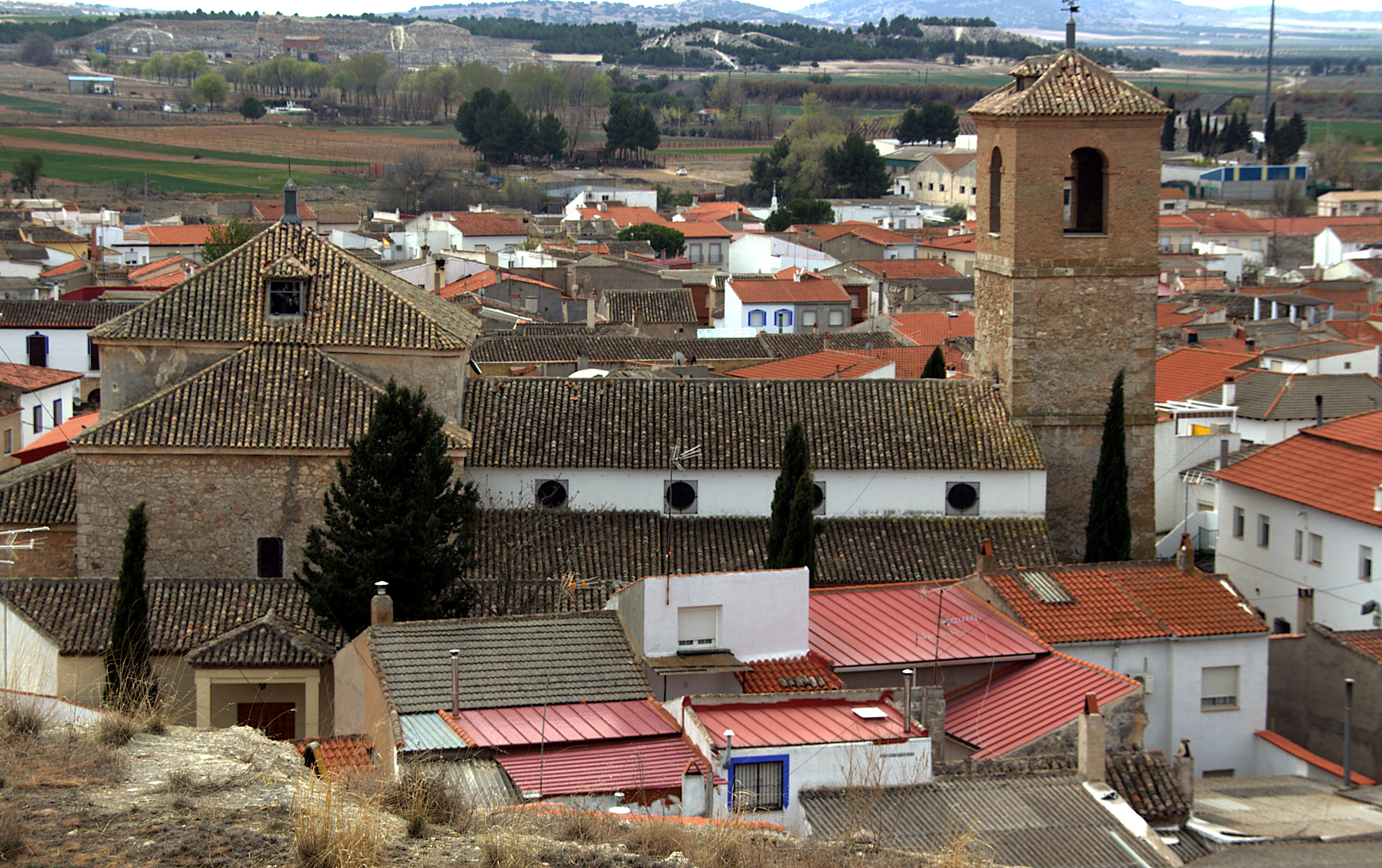
- Church of El Romeral

- Flag
- Interactive map of El Romeral
- Country: Spain
- Autonomous community: Castile-La Mancha
- Province: Toledo
- Municipality: El Romeral

Area
  - Total: 79 km^{2} (31 sq mi)
- Elevation: 622 m (2,041 ft)

Population (2025-01-01)
  - Total: 518
  - Density: 6.6/km^{2} (17/sq mi)
- Time zone: UTC+1 (CET)
  - Summer (DST): UTC+2 (CEST)

El Romeral is a municipality located in the province of Toledo, Castile-La Mancha, Spain. According to the 2006 census (INE), the municipality has a population of 807 inhabitants.
