= Nieva, Spain =

Nieva
- Municipality
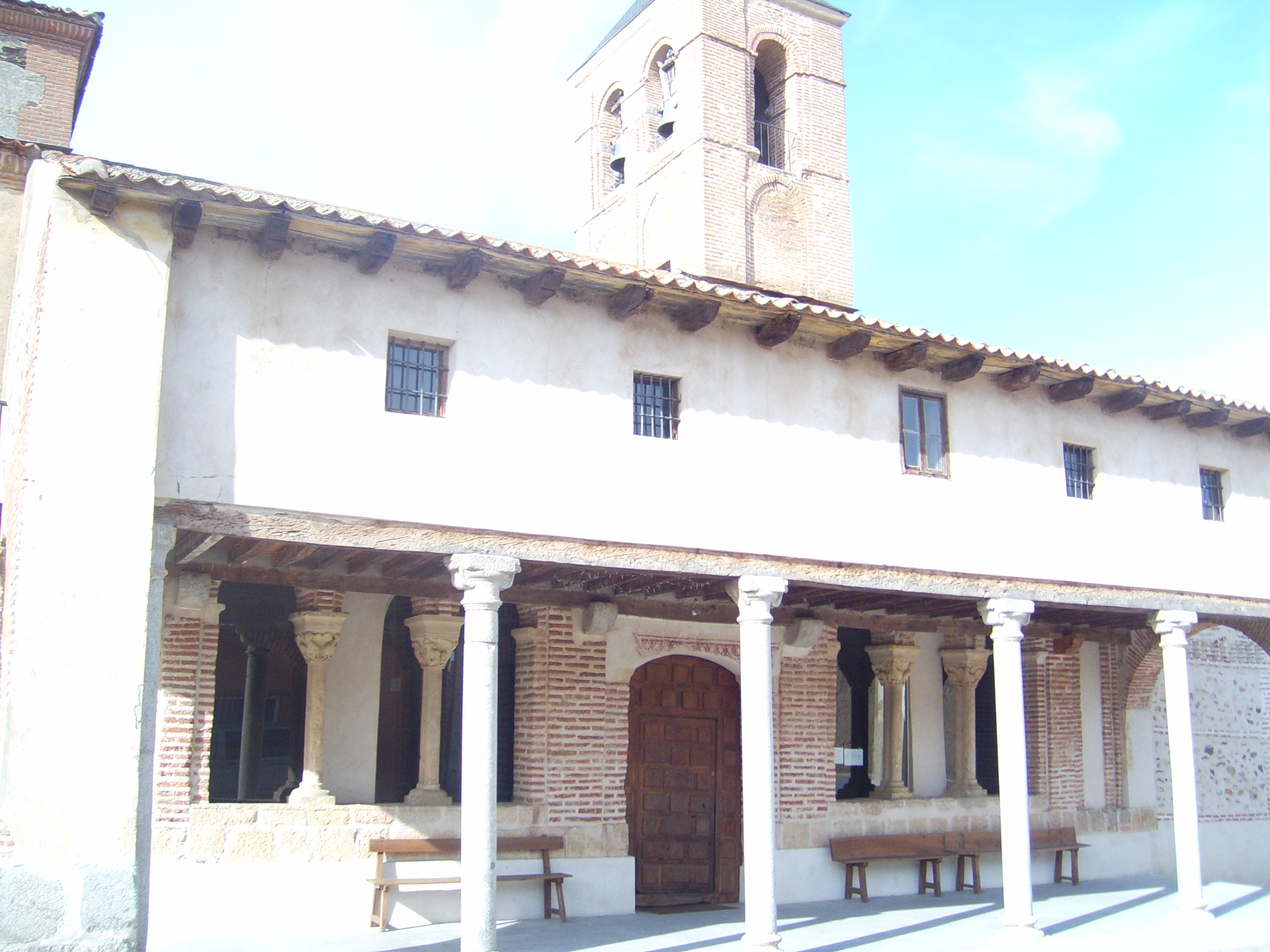

- Location in Spain. Nieva (Spain)
- Coordinates: 41°04′50″N 4°25′35″W
- Country: Spain
- Autonomous community: Castile and León
- Province: Segovia
- Municipality: Nieva

Area
  - Land: 33.81 km^{2} (13.05 sq mi)
- Elevation: 842 m (2,762 ft)

Population (2025-01-01)
  - Total: 256
- Time zone: UTC+1 (CET)
  - Summer (DST): UTC+2 (CEST)
- Website: Official website

Nieva is a municipality located in the province of Segovia, Castile and León, Spain, about 32 km (19.8 mi) northwest of the town of Segovia. According to the 2010 census (INE), the municipality has a population of 340 inhabitants.

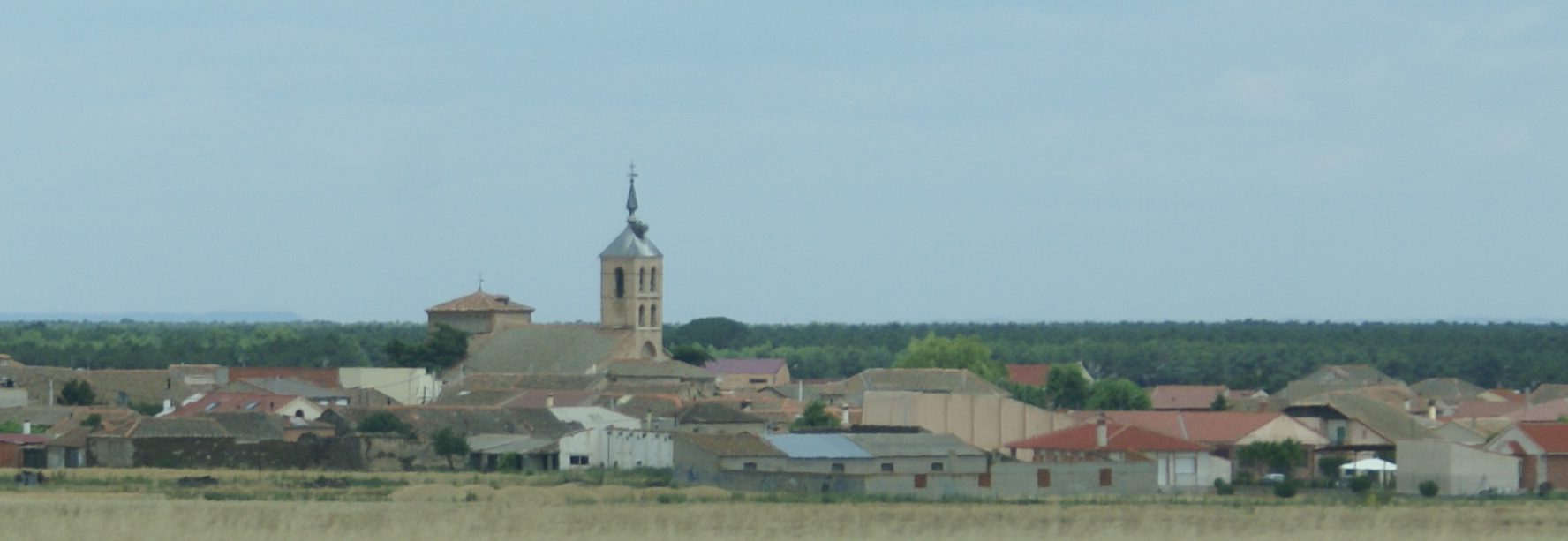
View of Nieva.
