= Villaseca de Arciel =

- Municipality
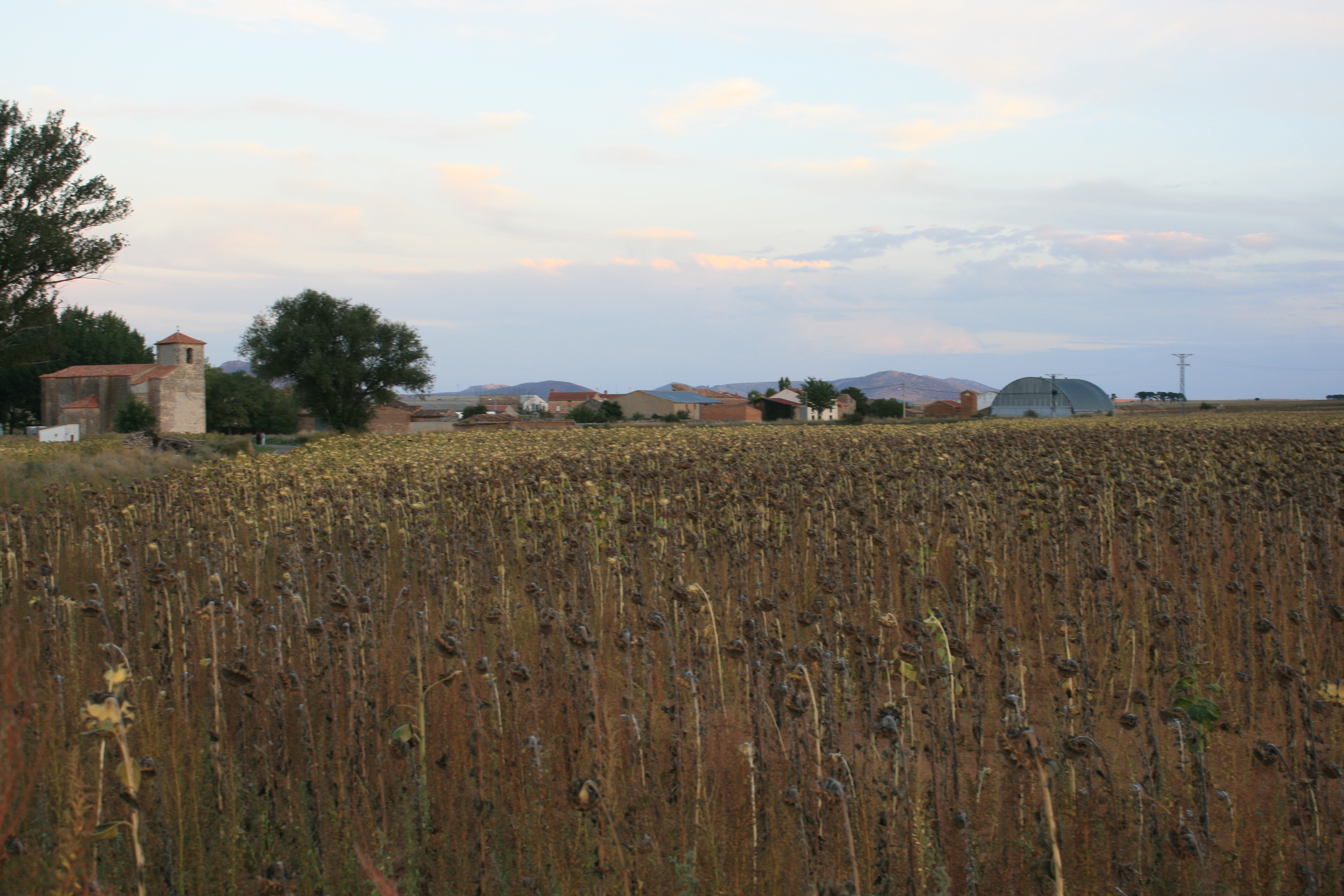

- Location in Spain. Villaseca de Arciel (Spain)
- Coordinates: 41°37′N 2°10′W
- Country: Spain
- Autonomous community: Castile and León
- Province: Soria
- Municipality: Villaseca de Arciel

Area
  - Total: 21.57 km^{2} (8.33 sq mi)
- Elevation: 1,006 m (3,301 ft)

Population (2025-01-01)
  - Total: 23
  - Density: 1.1/km^{2} (2.8/sq mi)
- Time zone: UTC+1 (CET)
  - Summer (DST): UTC+2 (CEST)
- Climate: Cfb
- Website: Official website

Villaseca de Arciel is a municipality located in the province of Soria, Castile and León, Spain. According to the 2004 census (INE), the municipality had a population of 40 inhabitants.
