= Pecharromán =

- village
- Pecharromán
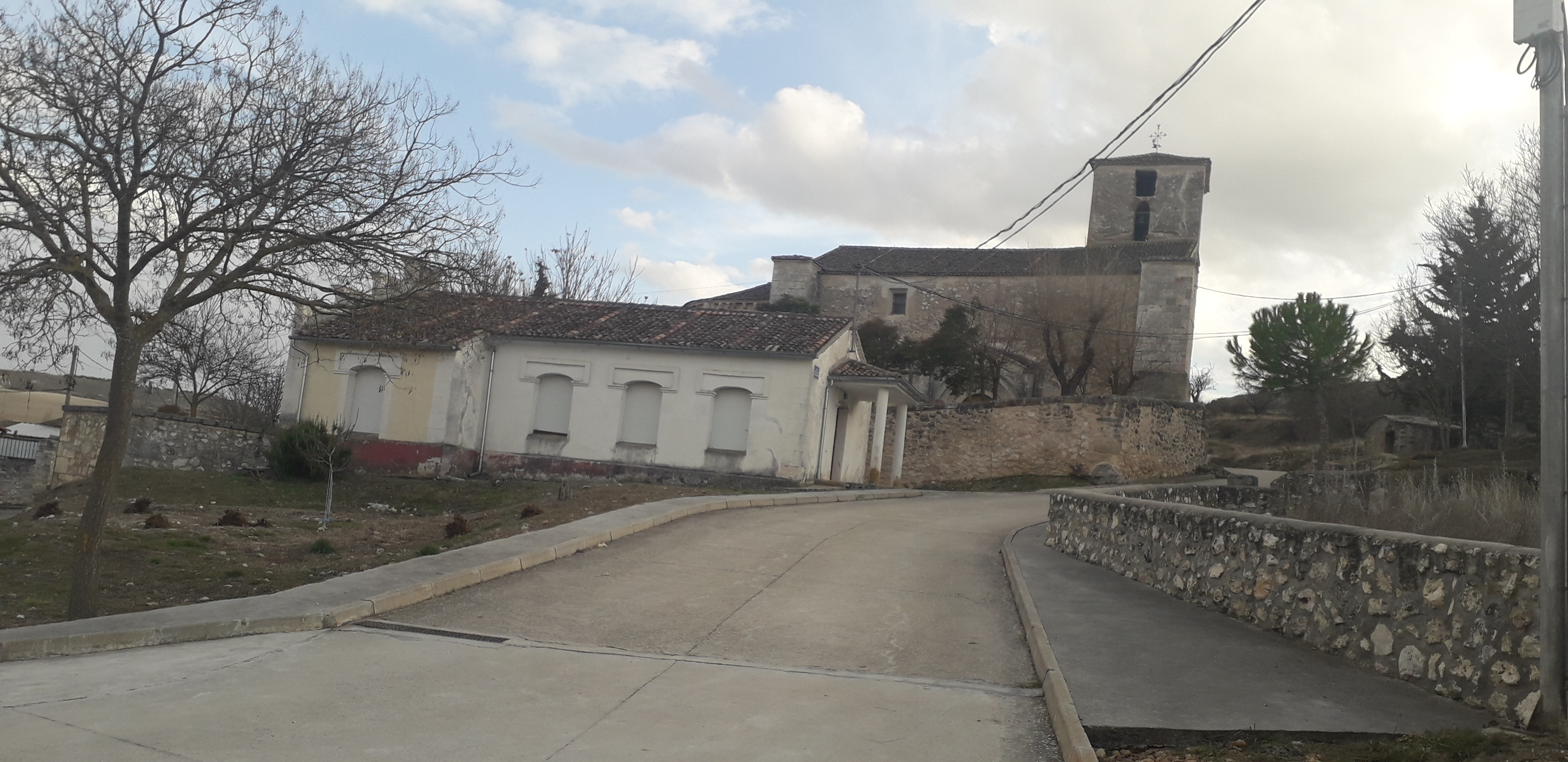
- Principal street

- Location within Spain
- Coordinates: 41°28′43″N 03°57′07″W
- Country: Spain
- Autonomous community: Castile and León
- Province: Province of Spain
- Judicial district: Judicial District of Cuéllar
- Municipality: Valtiendas
- Elevation: 863 m (2,831 ft)

Population (2016)
  - Total: 12
- Postal code: 40283

Pecharromán is a village located in the Province of Segovia, Castile and León (Spain). It belongs to the municipality of Valtiendas and has 12 inhabitants (2016). The village is 80 kilometers away from Segovia, and 863 meters above sea level.

== Geography ==
Pecharromán is located in the northern part of the Province of Segovia and in the center of the Iberian Peninsula. Its coordinates are: 41°28′43″N 3°57′07″O.

== Demographics ==
Historical populations
Year	Pop.	±%
2000	24	—
2002	28	+16.7%
2004	23	−17.9%
2006	25	+8.7%
2008	25	+0.0%
2010	24	−4.0%
2012	24	+0.0%
2014	14	−41.7%
2016	12	−14.3%

As in many small villages of Castile and León, the population of Pecharromán has been decreasing over the years. In the year 2000, 24 people lived in the village, but in 2016 the population decreased to 12.

== Main sights ==
- Iglesia de San Andrés (Saint Andrew Church): it is a church located in the center of Pecharromán. It is named after the village's patron saint, and still has some Romanesque remains.
- Iglesia de Santa María de Cárdaba (Saint Mary of Cárdaba Church): this church, also named Iglesia de Santa Apolonia, is located in the center of the village. It used to be a Romanesque monastery built in the 10th century.
- Ermita de la Virgen del Prado (Hermitage of the Meadows Virgin): it is a hermitage located in the surroundings of Pecharromán.
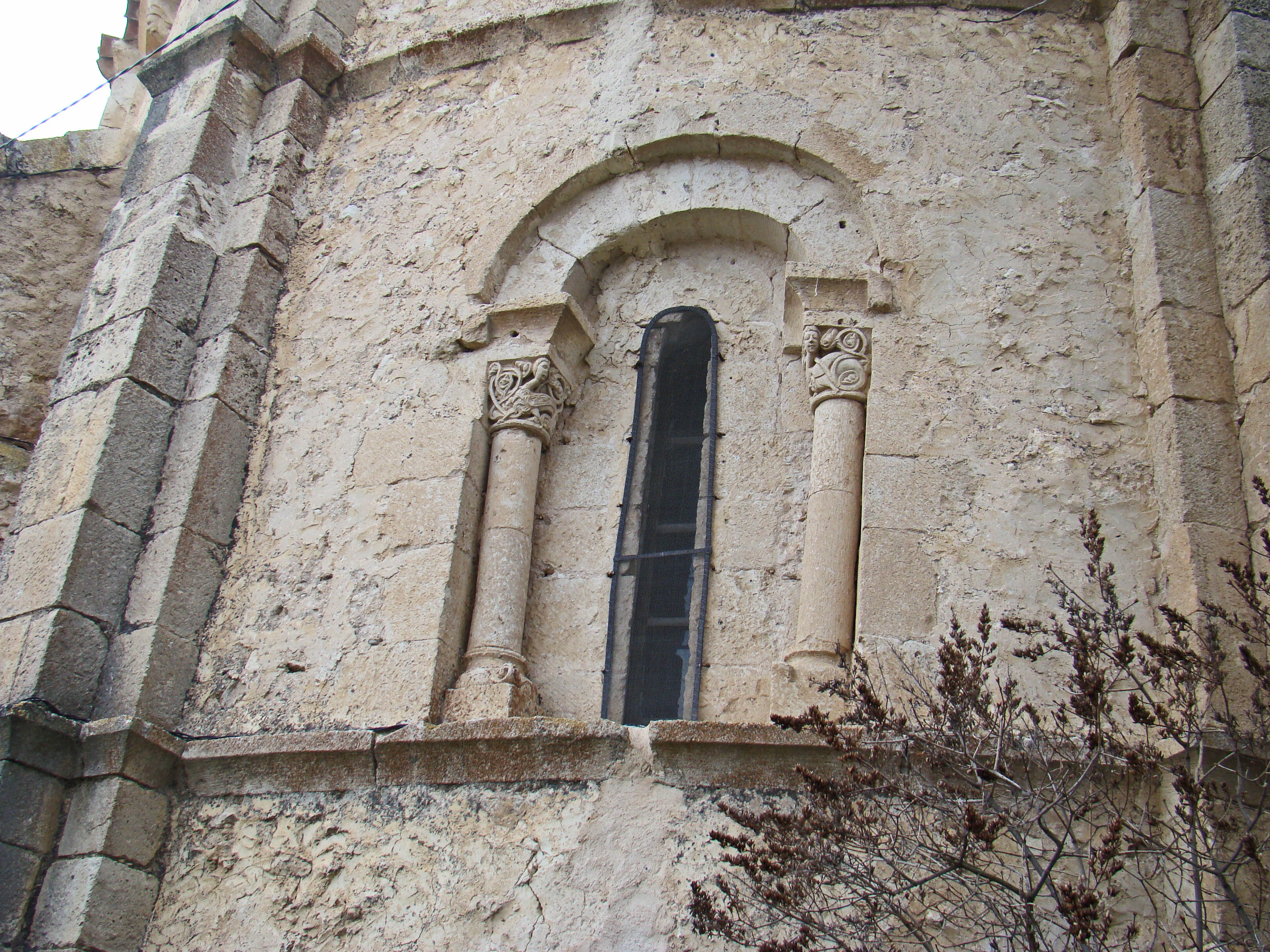
Window of Iglesia de San Andrés.

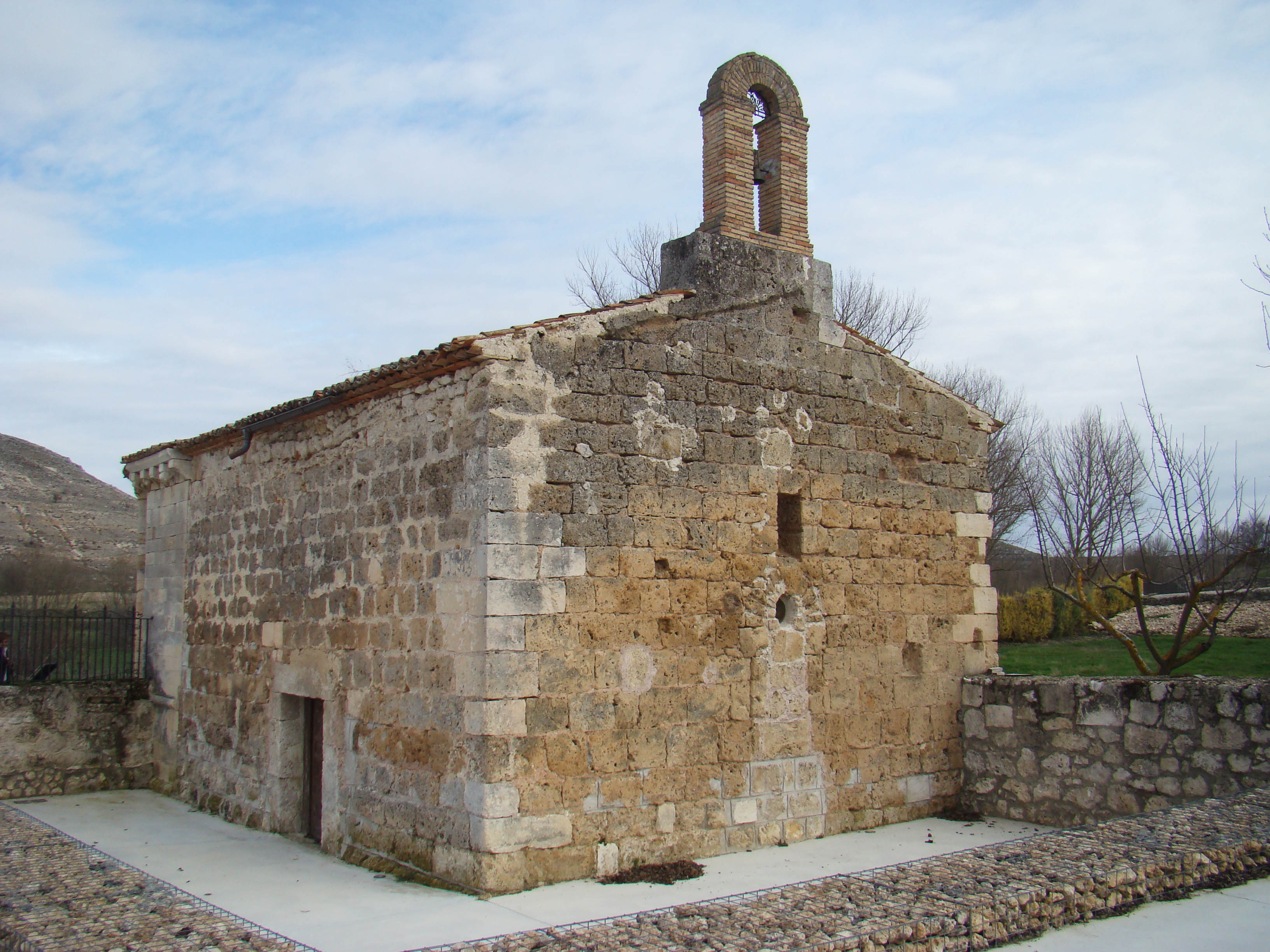
Iglesia de Santa María de Cárdaba.

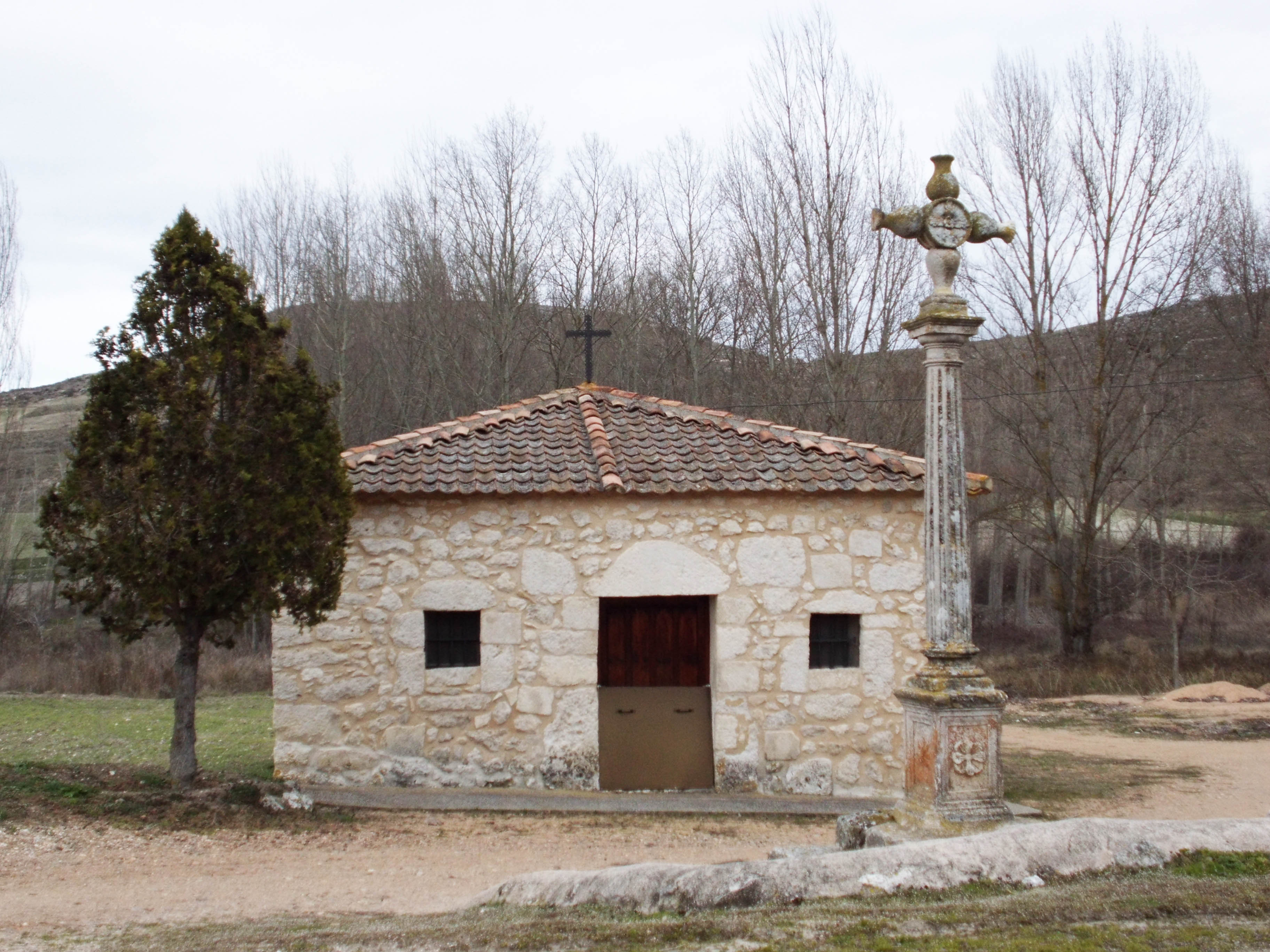
Ermita de Virgen del Prado.

== See also ==
- List of municipalities in Segovia
- Province of Segovia
- Valtiendas
