= Valtiendas =

- Municipality
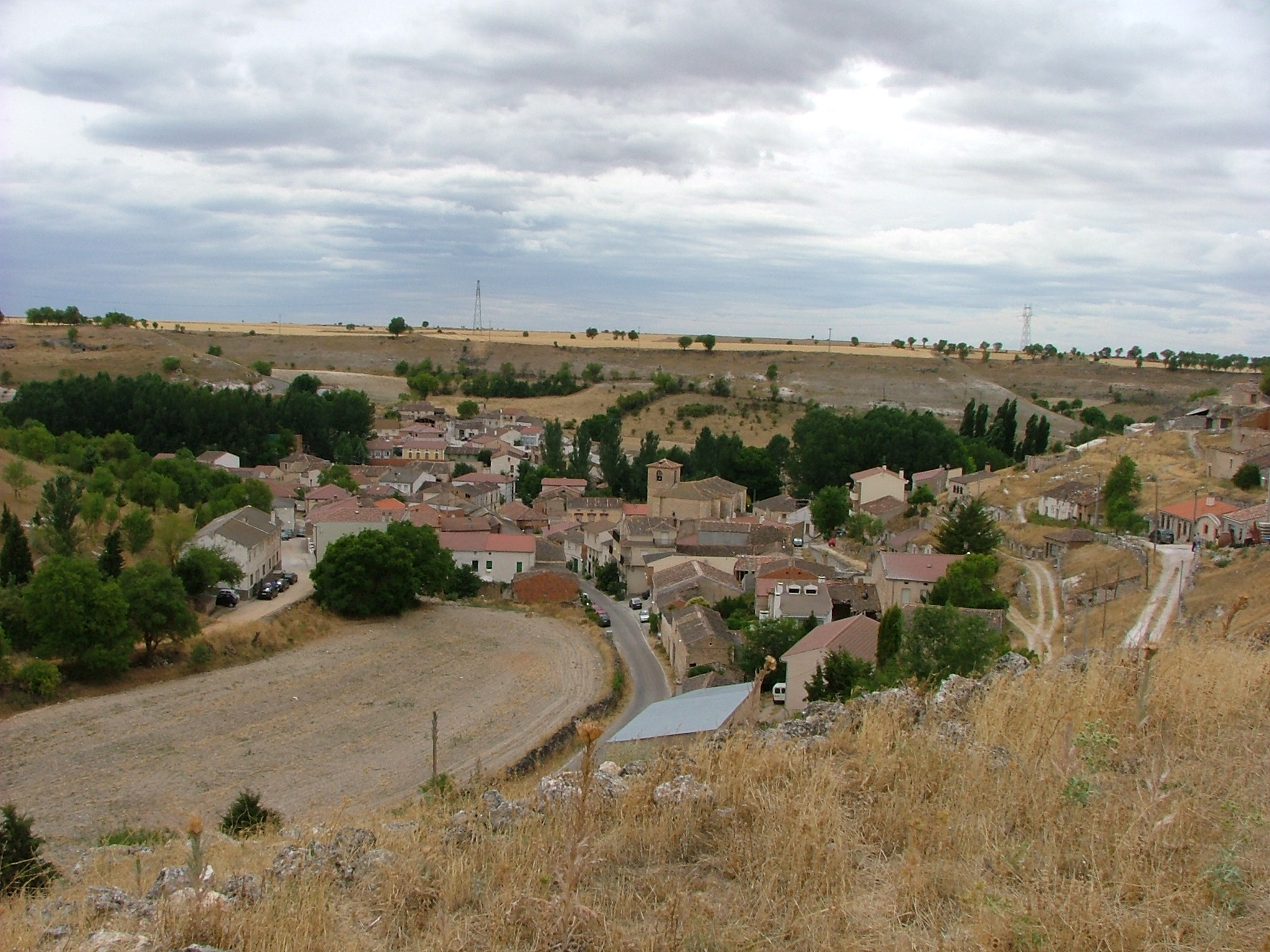
- Panoramic view of Valtiendas

- Location in Spain. Valtiendas (Spain)
- Coordinates: 41°28′42″N 3°55′02″W
- Country: Spain
- Autonomous community: Castile and León
- Province: Segovia
- Municipality: Valtiendas

Area
  - Total: 38 km^{2} (15 sq mi)

Population (2025-01-01)
  - Total: 75
  - Density: 2.0/km^{2} (5.1/sq mi)
- Time zone: UTC+1 (CET)
  - Summer (DST): UTC+2 (CEST)
- Website: Official website

Valtiendas is a municipality located in the province of Segovia, Castile and León, Spain. According to the 2004 census (INE), the municipality has a population of 161 inhabitants.

It is formed by three towns: Valtiendas, Pecharromán and Caserío de San José.

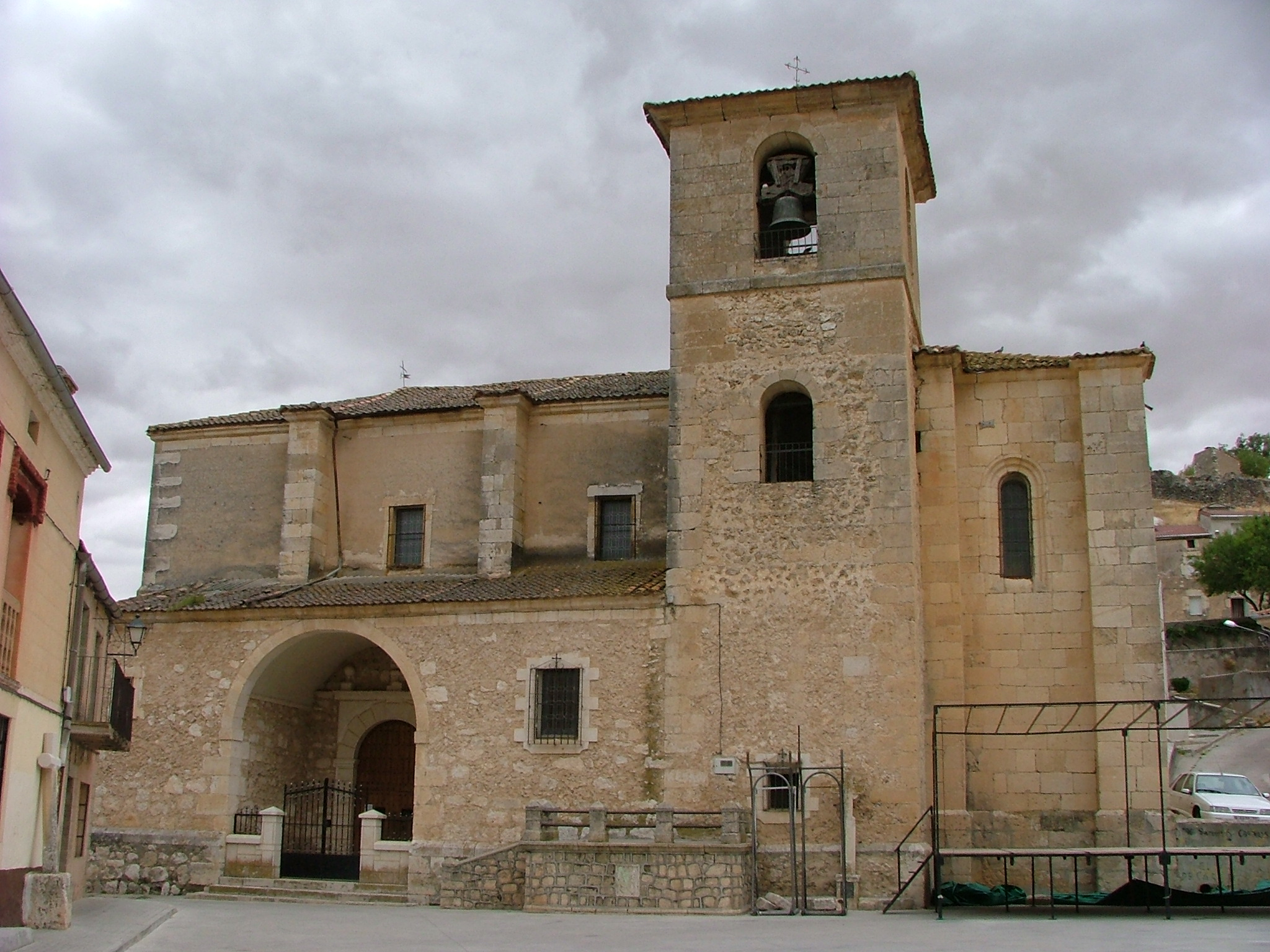
Church of Nuestra Señora de la Asunción, of renassaincist style.
