= Aldealengua de Santa María =

- Municipality
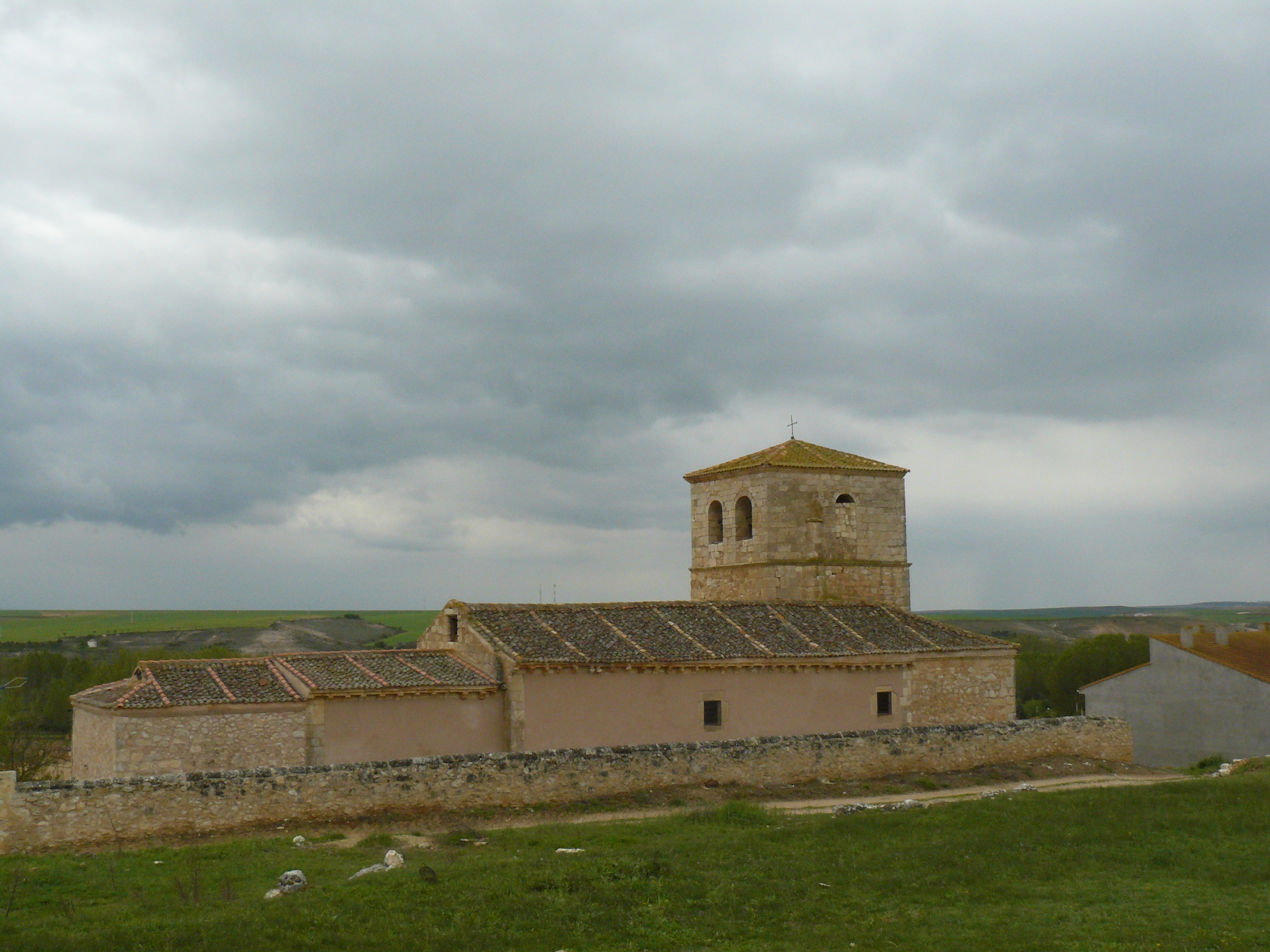
- Church of Our Lady of the Assumption, in Aldealengua de Santa María, Segovia.

- Location in Spain. Aldealengua de Santa María (Spain)
- Coordinates: 41°27′43″N 3°28′00″W
- Country: Spain
- Autonomous community: Castile and León
- Province: Segovia
- Municipality: Aldealengua de Santa María

Area
  - Total: 19.73 km^{2} (7.62 sq mi)
- Elevation: 948 m (3,110 ft)

Population (2025-01-01)
  - Total: 50
  - Density: 2.5/km^{2} (6.6/sq mi)
- Time zone: UTC+1 (CET)
  - Summer (DST): UTC+2 (CEST)
- Website: Official website

Aldealengua de Santa María is a municipality located in the province of Segovia, Castile and León, Spain. According to the 2004 census (INE), the municipality had a population of 78 inhabitants.
