= Cabanillas (disambiguation) =

Cabanillas may also refer to:

- Cabanillas del Monte, a locality of Torrecaballeros, Segovia, Spain
- Cabanillas del Pirón, uninhabited of Adrada de Pirón, Segovia, Spain
- Cabanillas, a locality of Cuadros, Leon, Spain
- Cabanillas, a locality of Alentisque, León, Spain
- Cabanillas de San Justo, a locality of Noceda del Bierzo, León, Spain
- Cabanillas, a municipality located in Navarre, Spain
- Cabanillas de la Sierra, a municipality of Madrid, Spain
- Cabanillas del Campo, a municipality in Guadalajara, Castile-La Mancha, Spain
- Cabanillas District, a district of San Román Province, Peru

== People with the surname ==
- Carlos Asensio Cabanillas (1896 – 1969), Spanish soldier and statesman
- Isabel Cabanillas (died 2020), Mexican artist
- José M. Cabanillas (1901 – 1979), United States Navy rear admiral
- José María Cabanillas (1892 – unknown), Spanish equestrian
- María del Tránsito Cabanillas (1821 – 1885), beatified Argentine Roman Catholic
- Mercedes Cabanillas (born 1947), Peruvian politician
- Nuria Cabanillas (born 1980), Spanish gymnast
- Pío Cabanillas Alonso (born 1958), Spanish politician
- Pío Cabanillas Gallas (1923 – 1991), Spanish jurist and politician
