= San Cristóbal de Segovia =

- Municipality
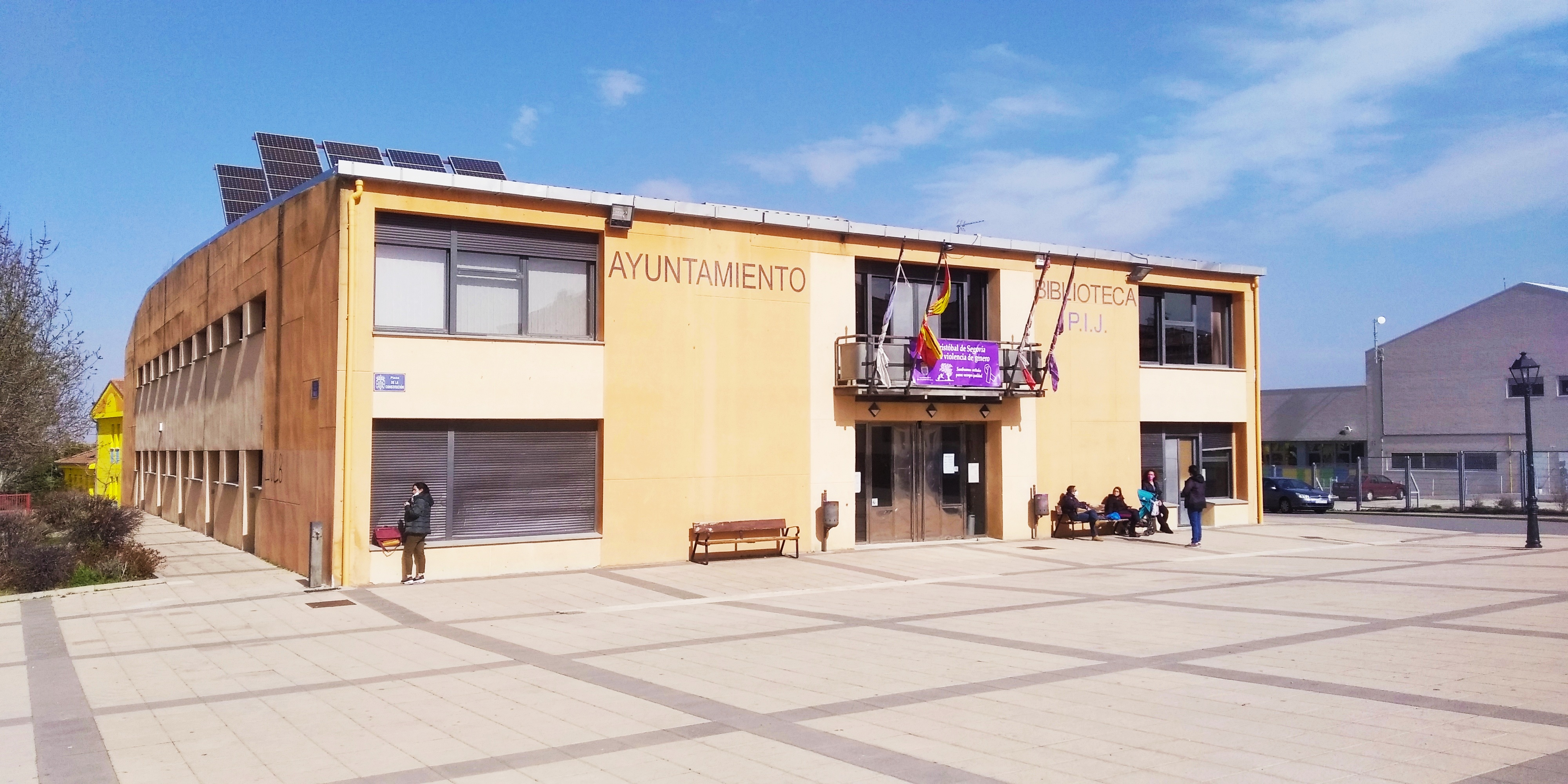

- Flag Coat of arms

- Location in Spain. San Cristóbal de Segovia (Spain)
- Coordinates: 40°57′07″N 4°04′32″W
- Country: Spain
- Autonomous community: Castile and León
- Province: Segovia
- Municipality: San Cristóbal de Segovia

Area
  - Total: 6.35 km^{2} (2.45 sq mi)
- Elevation: 1,074 m (3,524 ft)

Population (2025-01-01)
  - Total: 3,161
  - Density: 498/km^{2} (1,290/sq mi)
- Time zone: UTC+1 (CET)
  - Summer (DST): UTC+2 (CEST)
- Website: Official website

San Cristóbal de Segovia is a town and municipality located in the Province of Segovia, Castile and Leon, Spain. The municipality has a population of 3153 inhabitants. It separated from Palazuelos de Eresma municipality on the 25 November 1999.

The municipality contains the towns of Montecorredores, El Terradillo and San Cristóbal de Segovia, as well as the former towns of Aragoneses and Cáceres, which were both along the border with the neighbouring municipality of Trescasas, and Prozaces, which was entirely within the municipality. It is 2km to the north-east of Segovia, and has seen a significant recent increase in its population, due to its proximity to the capital.

== Geography ==
=== Location ===
San Cristóbal is a part of the Communidad de ciudad y tierra de Segovia, and more recently as a suburb of Segovia.

The municipality is in the comarca of Tierras de Segovia, and the Segovia Metropolitan Area.

=== Physical Geography ===
The highest point in the municipality is Cabezuelas at 1105m above sea level. Cabezuelas is a hill on the border with Trescasas and previously held the town of Cáceres. The lowest point is along the Eresma River, at a height of 963m.

The Eresma and Ciguiñuela Rivers form the Western and most of the southern border of the municipality. The Milón and Recuéncano streams are located within the municipality, and flow into the Ciguiñuela River. The Las Peñas Lisas y Cerezo stream lie within the municipality and flows into the Eresma River.

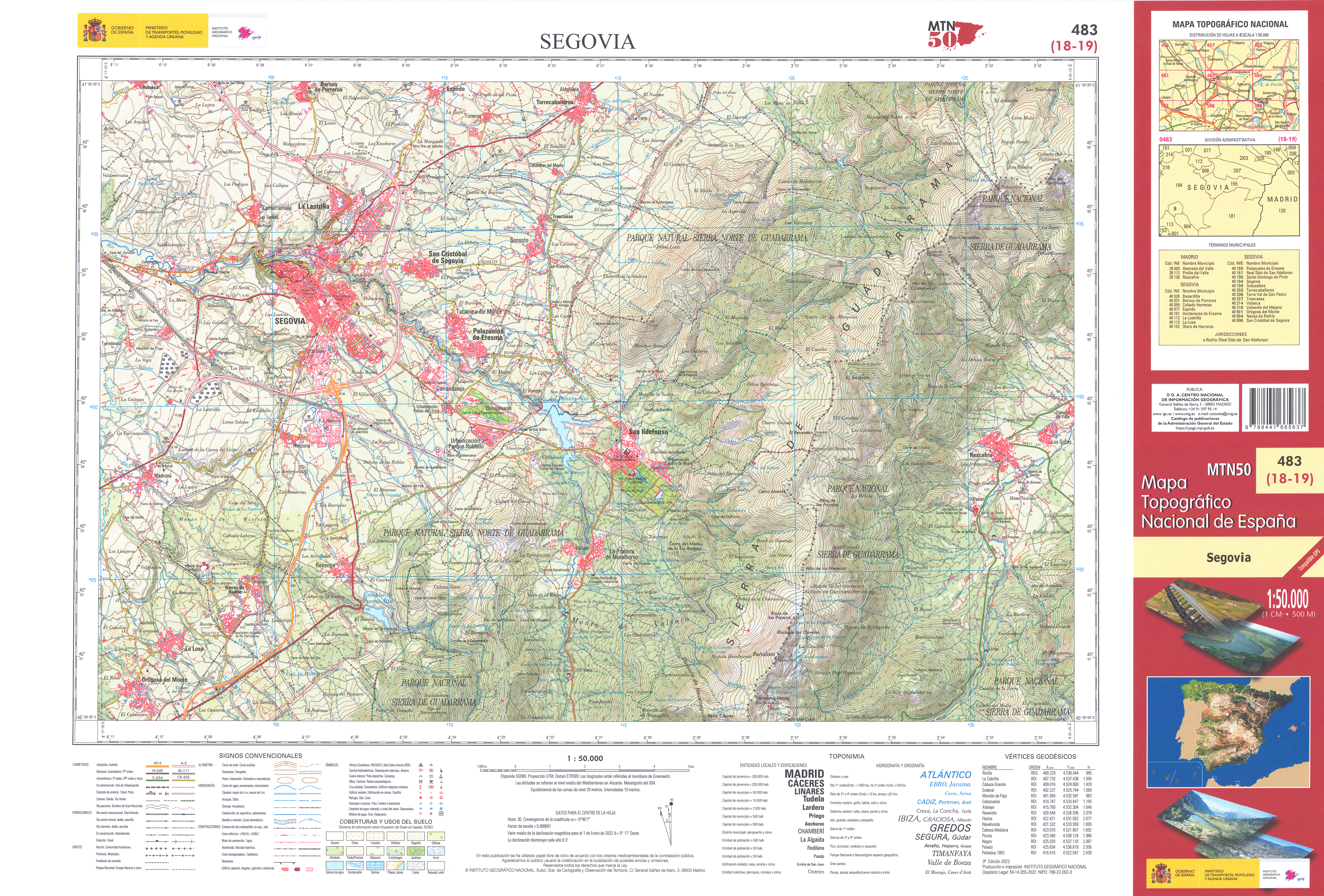
Section 483 of the 2022 National Topographic Map of Spain, which contains San Cristóbal.

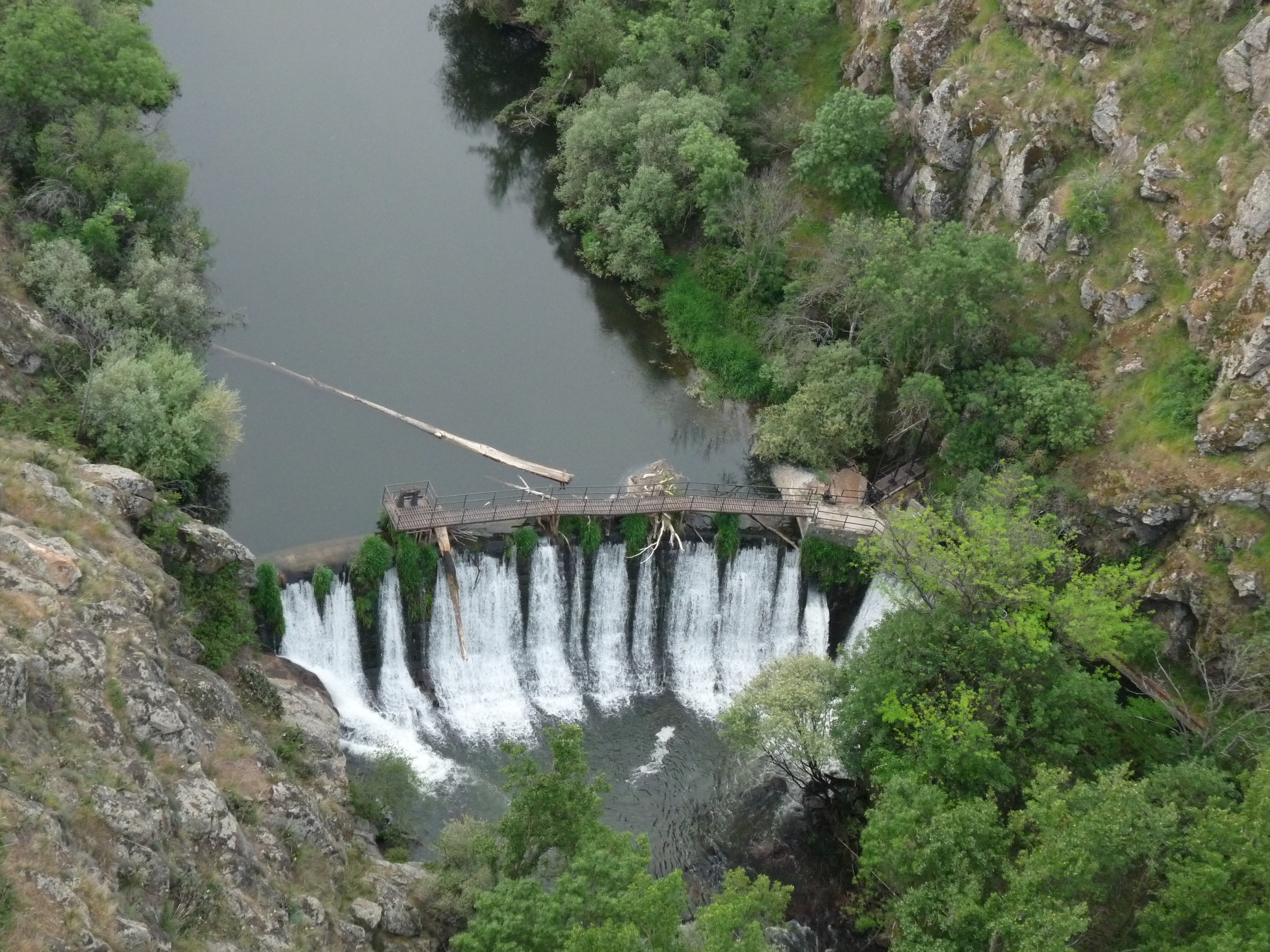
Small dam along the Eresma River, on the southern border of the municipality

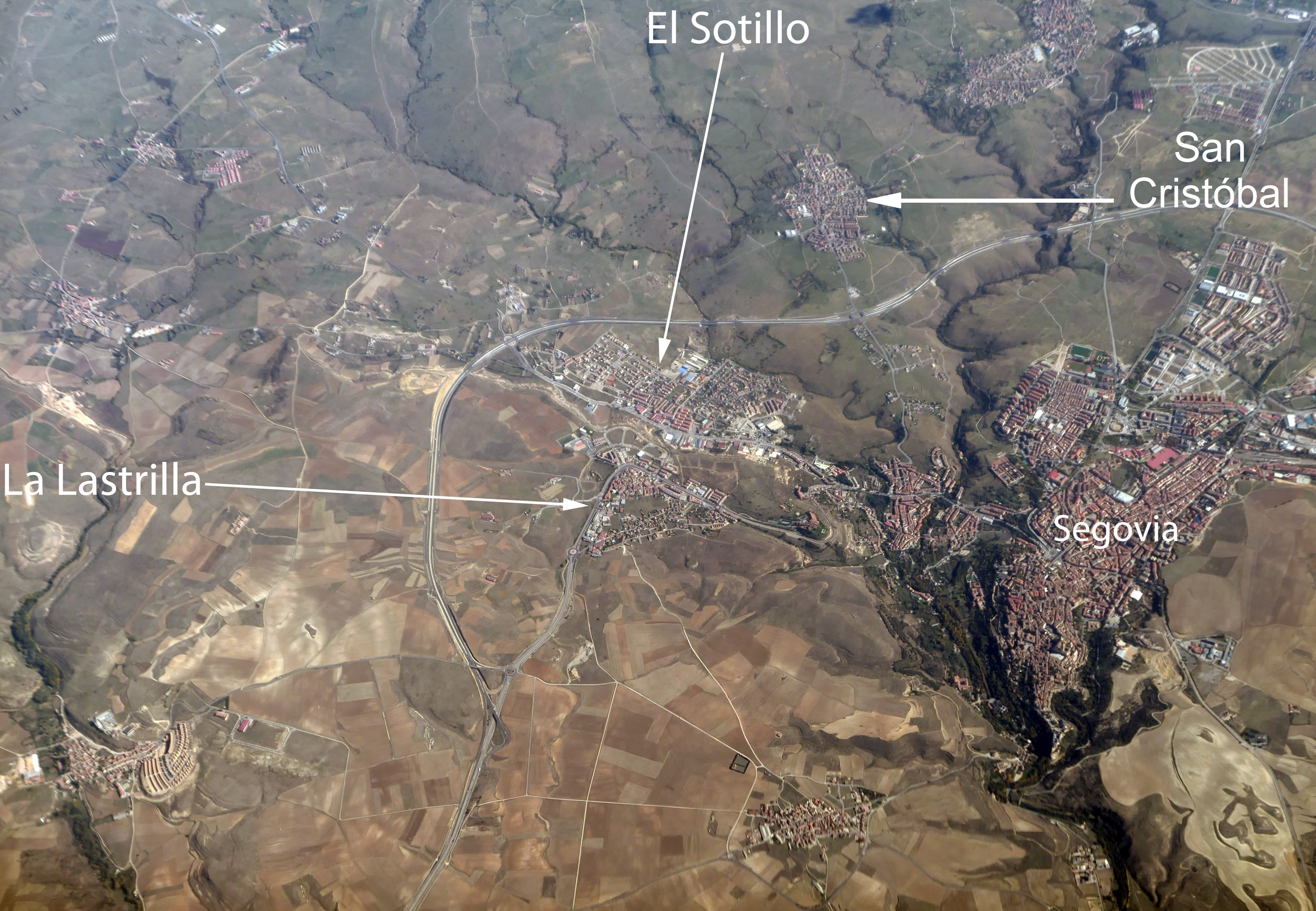
Aerial view of San Cristóbal and its surrounding towns.

== History ==
=== Middle Ages ===
San Cristóbal was first settled by Segovians who fled the city following the Muslim invasions and founded smaller villages in the surrounding hills. It was then repopulated during the second Castilian repopulation, when the border regions in modern-day Ávila and Segovia provinces were populated with settlers from further north.

The first documented mention is from 1247, called "Sant Christoval" or "Sant Xval" and refers to it as a satellite town of the city of Segovia.

Its economy was focused on agriculture and livestock farming. The town also contained an irrigation system transporting water from the Cambrones river.

=== Modern History ===
San Cristóbal had a church dedicated to its namesake Saint. At the beginning of the 18^{th} Century, however, the dedication to Saint Christopher was changed to Our Lady of the Rosary, it was around this time when the confraternities of la Santa Vera Cruz and de Nuestra Señora de Rosario were founded.

During the Peninsula War San Cristóbal, La Lastrilla, Zamarramala and Perogordo were considered part of the City of Segovia, as is seen in the French street map of the City.

=== Contemporary History ===
Following the Territorial Division of 1833, San Cristóbal de Segovia became part of the Province of Segovia, within the region of Old Castile. In the mid-19^{th} century, the town had a population of 93.

In 1862 or 1863, San Cristóbal was annexed into the municipality of Palazuelos, and was renamed to San Cristóbal de Palazuelos.

In 1940 it was listed as a village within Palazuelos de Eresma, with 51 homes and 56 other buildings, a registered population of 261 and an actual population of 236.

In 1958, the church was demolished and replaced with a new church. To cut costs, portions of the church, such as capitals, columns, pulpit, the baptismal font and Saint Roch altarpiece were reused in the new church. With public subsidies and assistance from locals, construction was completed by 16 September 1962. The Baptismal font comes from an old church from the end of the 15^{th} century.

Located a few metres from the Town Centre is the hermitage of Saint Anthony of Padua, which dates from the mid-19^{th} century.

In the late 20^{th} century, several petitions regarding the separation of San Cristóbal from Palazuelos were submitted to the Regional Government of Castile and León, with all being signed by a majority of the town's population, all of which were rejected. On the 5 August 1990, an unofficial non-binding referendum was held in which the residents overwhelmingly voted for separation, although on a low turnout. On 25 November 1999, San Cristóbal was established as a separate municipality.

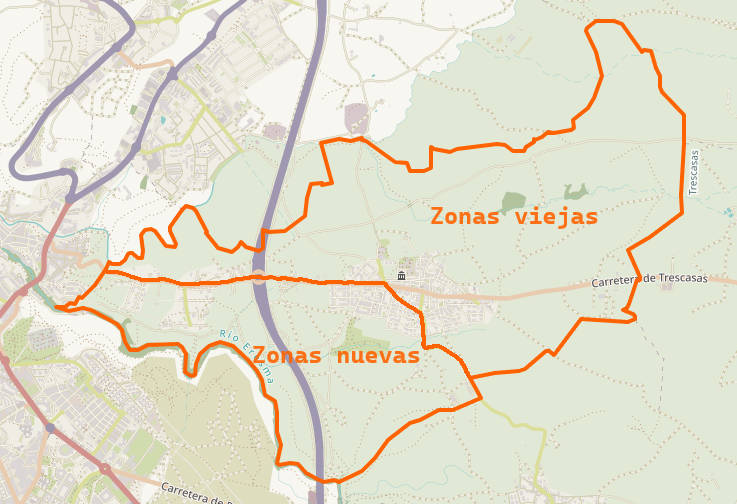
Map of the neighbourhoods and polling districts of San Cristóbal de Segovia

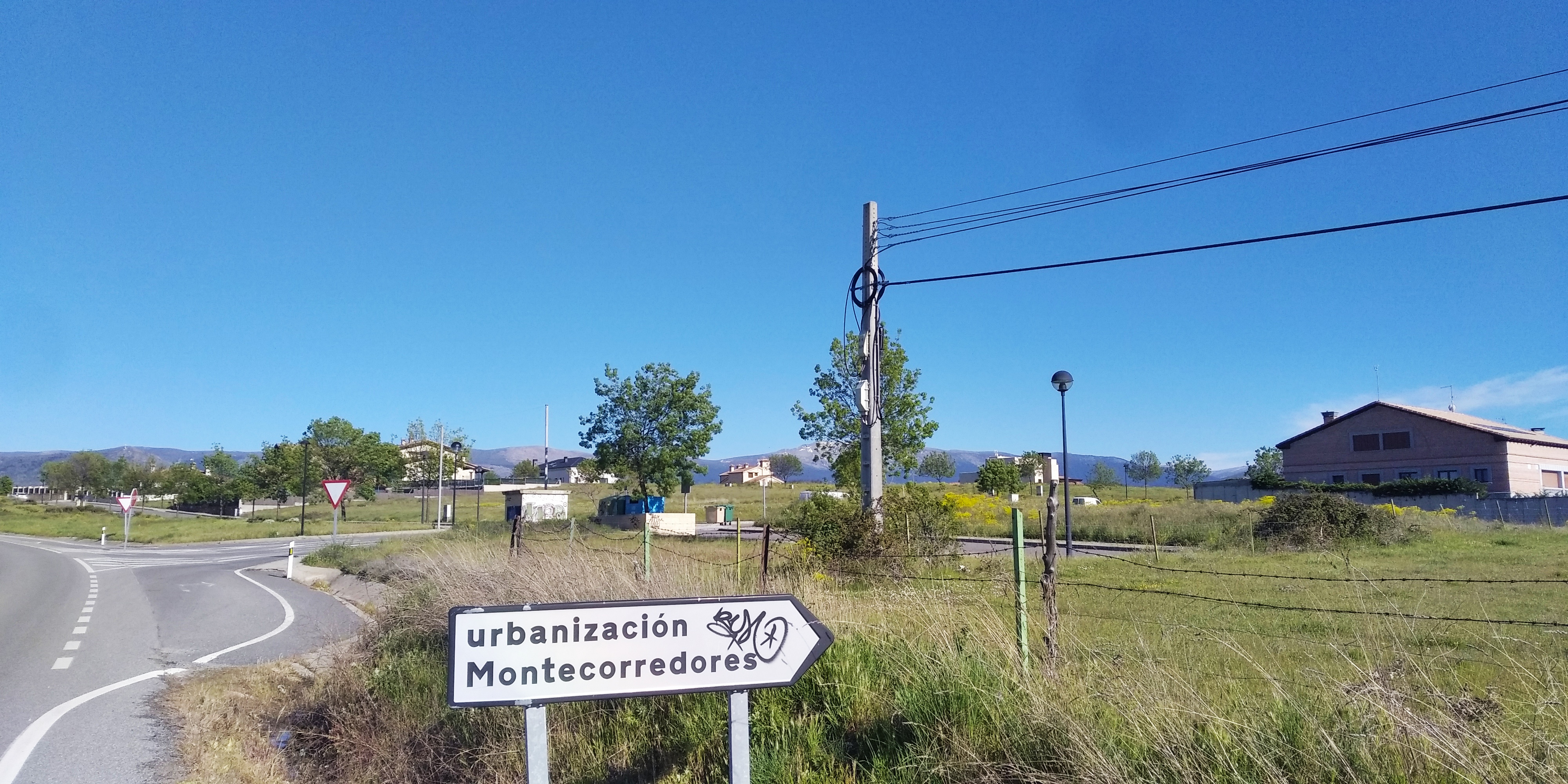
Entrance to Montecorredores

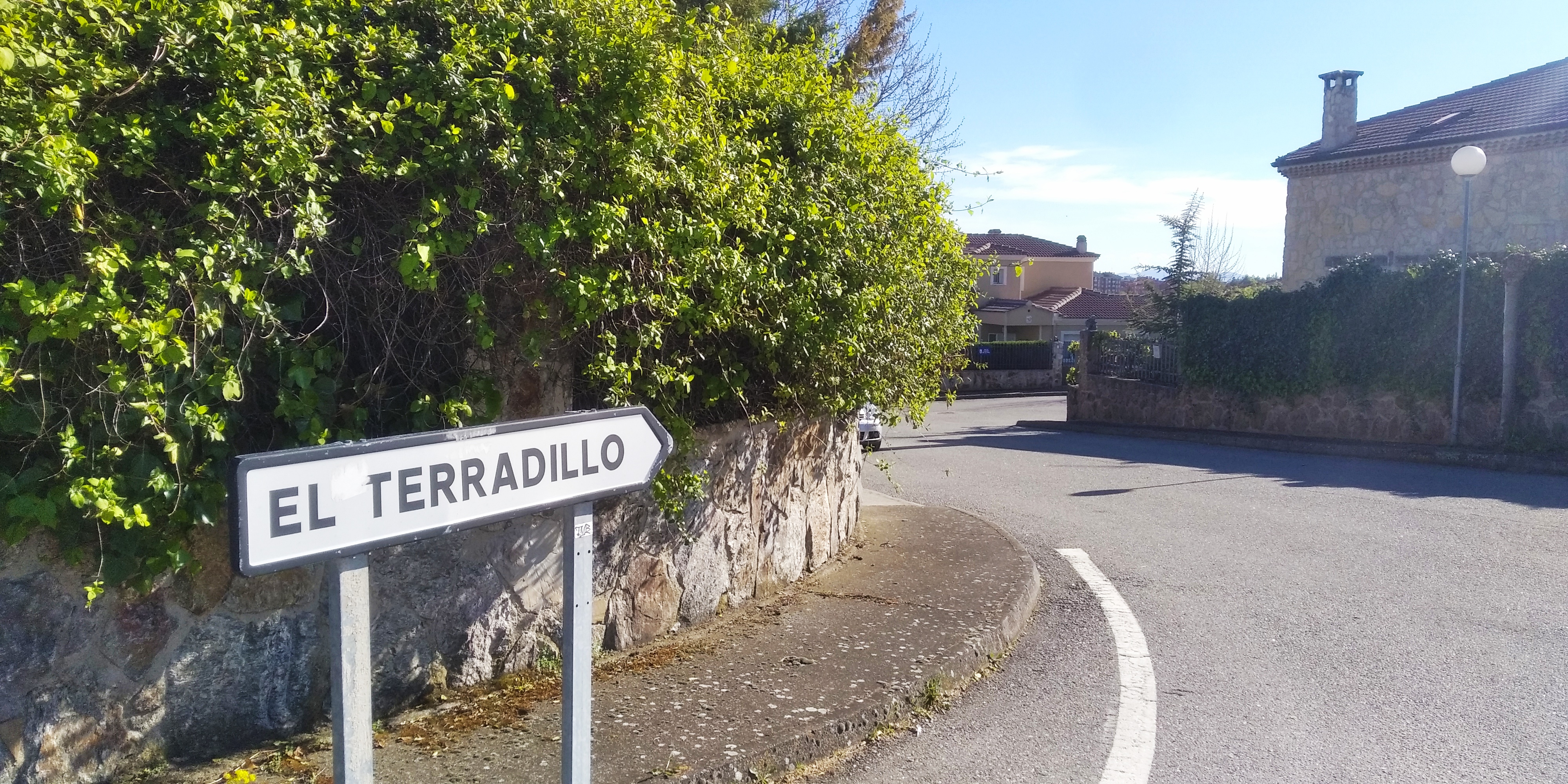
Entrance to El Terradillo

== Demography ==
1st January population estimate of San Cristóbal de Segovia between 2001 and 2023

Year	Pop.	±%
2001	1,751	—
2002	1,968	+12.4%
2003	2,245	+14.1%
2004	2,324	+3.5%
2005	2,455	+5.6%
2006	2,596	+5.7%
2007	2,761	+6.4%
2008	2,854	+3.4%
2009	2,908	+1.9%
2010	2,921	+0.4%
2011	2,899	−0.8%
2012	2,928	+1.0%

Year	Pop.	±%
2013	2,916	−0.4%
2014	2,939	+0.8%
2015	2,964	+0.9%
2016	2,991	+0.9%
2017	3,028	+1.2%
2018	3,021	−0.2%
2019	3,051	+1.0%
2020	3,080	+1.0%
2021	3,102	+0.7%
2022	3,110	+0.3%
2023	3,152	+1.4%

Registered population of San Cristóbal between 1828 and 2021
Population according to Sebastián Miñano
Population according to the BBVA Foundation
Registered population according to the INE Census

In 1900, San Cristóbal was the 8^{th} smallest town in the Province of Segovia. In 2025, it was the 8^{th} largest with 3080 inhabitants.

The 3 population centres within the municipality and their populations in 2021 were:

Distribution of the population
El Terradillo	Montecorredores	San Cristóbal de Segovia
29	46	3035

== Symbols ==

The Municipal Shield and Flag were officially adopted on the 23 January 2009.

The Coat of Arms is a field of blue, with 4 silver lines, a silver border and 8 flax flowers. The Flax flowers within the shield represents the Noble Junta de Cabezuelas.

The Flag of San Cristóbal de Segovia is a 1:1 flag, divided into 3 bands, a central blue band, twice the width of the two white bands on the top and bottom of the flag, with the Coat of Arms in the centre of the flag.

== Politics and Administration ==
Composition of the Council after the 2023 Municipal Elections

=== Municipal Administration ===
There have been 4 Mayors in San Cristóbal since its separation from Palazuelos in 1999, of which all but the first were elected, while the first mayor was appointed by the Provincial Deputation.

List of Mayors since 1999
Term	Name	Party
1999-2003	Gabino Herranz Benito	Independent Group of San Cristóbal (GISCS)
2003-2007	Elías Sacristán Martín	People's Party
2007-2011	Belén Salamanca Escorial	Spanish Socialist Workers' Party
2011-Now	Óscar Benito Moral Sanz	People's Party

San Cristóbal de Segovia local election results
Partido político	2023			2019			2015			2011			2007		
Partido político	%	Votes	Cllrs.	%	Votes	Cllrs.	%	Votes	Cllrs.	%	Votes	Cllrs.	%	Votes	Cllrs.
People's Party	62.63	969	8	50.53	802	6	46.35	622	6	55.37	717	7	40.75	509	5
Spanish Socialist Workers' Party	28.37	439	3	27.15	431	3	31.59	424	4	38.84	503	4	31.71	396	4
Centrados	—	—	—	12.16	193	1	—	—	—	—	—	—	—	—	—
Citizens	—	—	—	7.75	123	1	—	—	—	—	—	—	—	—	—
Union, Progress and Democracy	—	—	—	—	—	—	14.75	198	1	—	—	—	—	—	—
Independent Group of San Cristóbal de Segovia (GISCS)	—	—	—	—	—	—	—	—	—	—	—	—	12.33	154	1
Castilian Party–Commoners' Land	—	—	—	—	—	—	—	—	—	—	—	—	10.65	133	1

=== Separation ===
Non-binding referendum on the separation of San Cristóbal
- 5 August 1990

Results
Choice	Votes	%
Yes	151	87.28%
No	22	12.72%
Valid votes	173	99.43%
Invalid or blank votes	1	0.57%
Total votes	174	100.00%
Registered voters/turnout	1,200	14.5%

During the late 20th century, while still a part of Palazuelos, the municipal residents repeatedly petitioned the Regional Government, but these petitions were consistently rejected. On the 5 August 1990, a non-binding referendum was held, in which there was overwhelming support for separation, though it was on a very low turnout. On the 25 November 1999, after the pro-Separation group, GISCS, gained power in the Palazuelos Municipal council, permission was granted to establish an independent municipality..

=== Municipal Debt ===
The Municipal Debt per capita at the end of 2021 is €674.00.

Municipal debt is all debt owed to banks and other financial institutions related to financial loans, fixed-income securities, and third-party loans, and does not include commercial debt.

Evolution of Municipal Debt between 2008 and 2022
Municipal debt in thousands of Euros, according to the Ministry of Finance

=== Autonomous Administration ===
The Regional Government of Castile and Leon manages the Municipality's education and healthcare services.

=== Justice ===
San Cristóbal de Segovia is part of the Judicial District of Segovia, along with 55 other municipalities, including the capital. This Judicial District elects 15 Provincial Deputies.

A map showing the municipalities within Commonwealth of La Atalaya (shown in Red)

=== Commonwealth of La Atalaya ===
San Cristóbal de Segovia is also part of the Commonwealth of La Atalaya since the Commonwealth's foundation in 1987. The Commonwealth is a voluntary grouping of municipalities jointly managing certain services. Its headquarters are in Palazuelos de Eresma and includes the municipalities of La Lastrilla, Trescasas, Palazuelos de Eresma and San Cristóbal de Segovia. Prior to San Cristóbal's separation, the area was part of the Commonwealth through its administration within the Palazuelos de Eresma municipality. The current leader of the Commonwealth is Jesús Nieto Martín, the Mayor of Palazuelos de Eresma.

== Services ==
=== Education ===
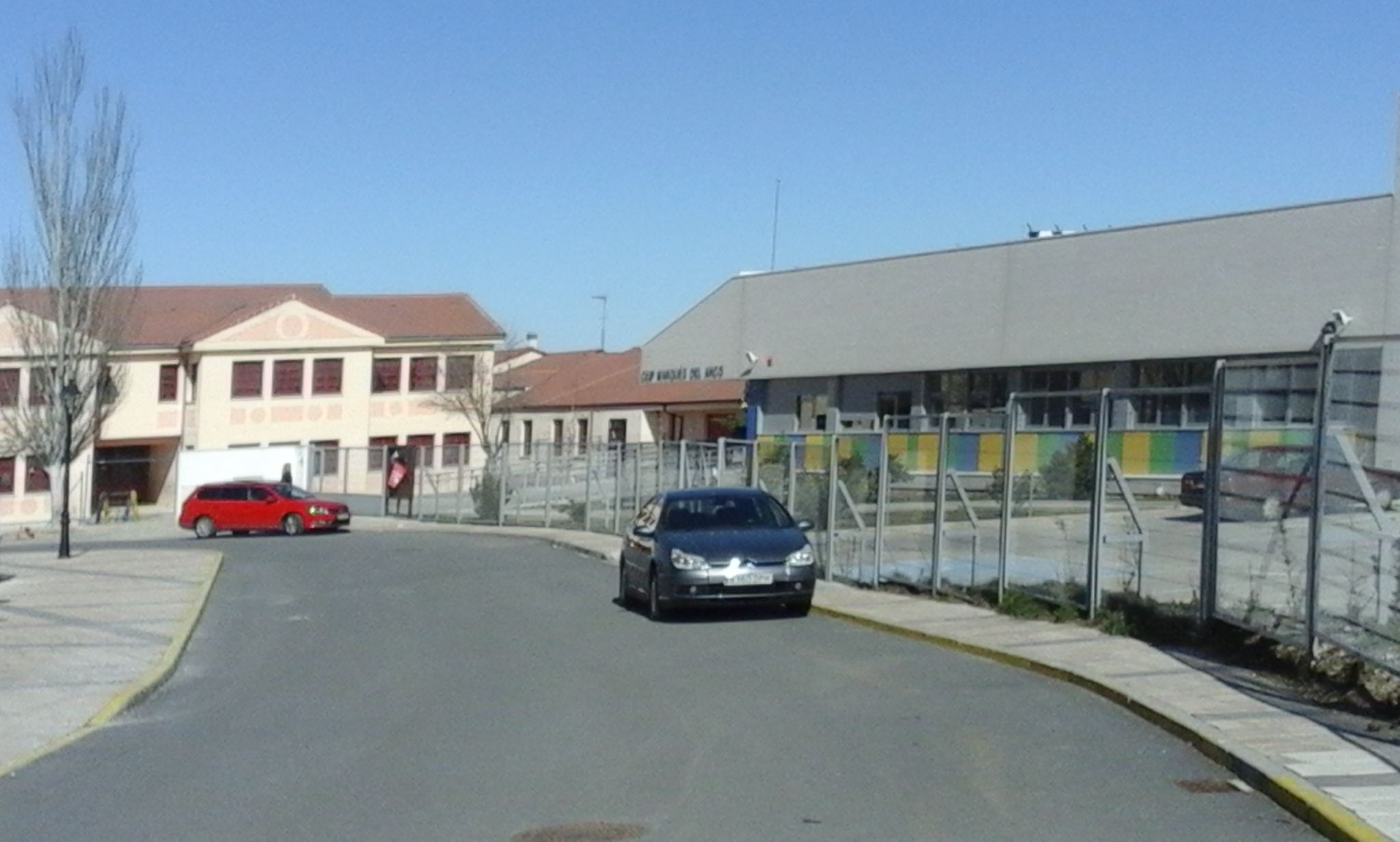
Marqués del Arco Primary School (CEIP)

In San Cristóbal there is a public nursery, a public primary school (CEIP Marqués del Arco) and Sancris, a youth service, in the Municipal library.

=== Health ===
The municipality is part of the Segovia Capital health region and has a GP office operated by SACYL, the region-run health service for Castile and León. Residents also have access to the Segovia Rural Clinic, nearby to the General Hospital of Segovia. The municipality also contains a pharmacy.

=== Public Safety ===
The 112 Emergency system is operational in San Cristóbal de Segovia. This system handles any emergency situation related to health, fire, rescue, public safety or civil protection.

The municipality has a team of volunteers that form the local Civil Protection Unit, a branch of the Civil Guard of Segovia. The local police and Civil Protection facilities are maintained on behalf of the municipality by the Commonwealth of La Atalaya.

=== Transportation ===
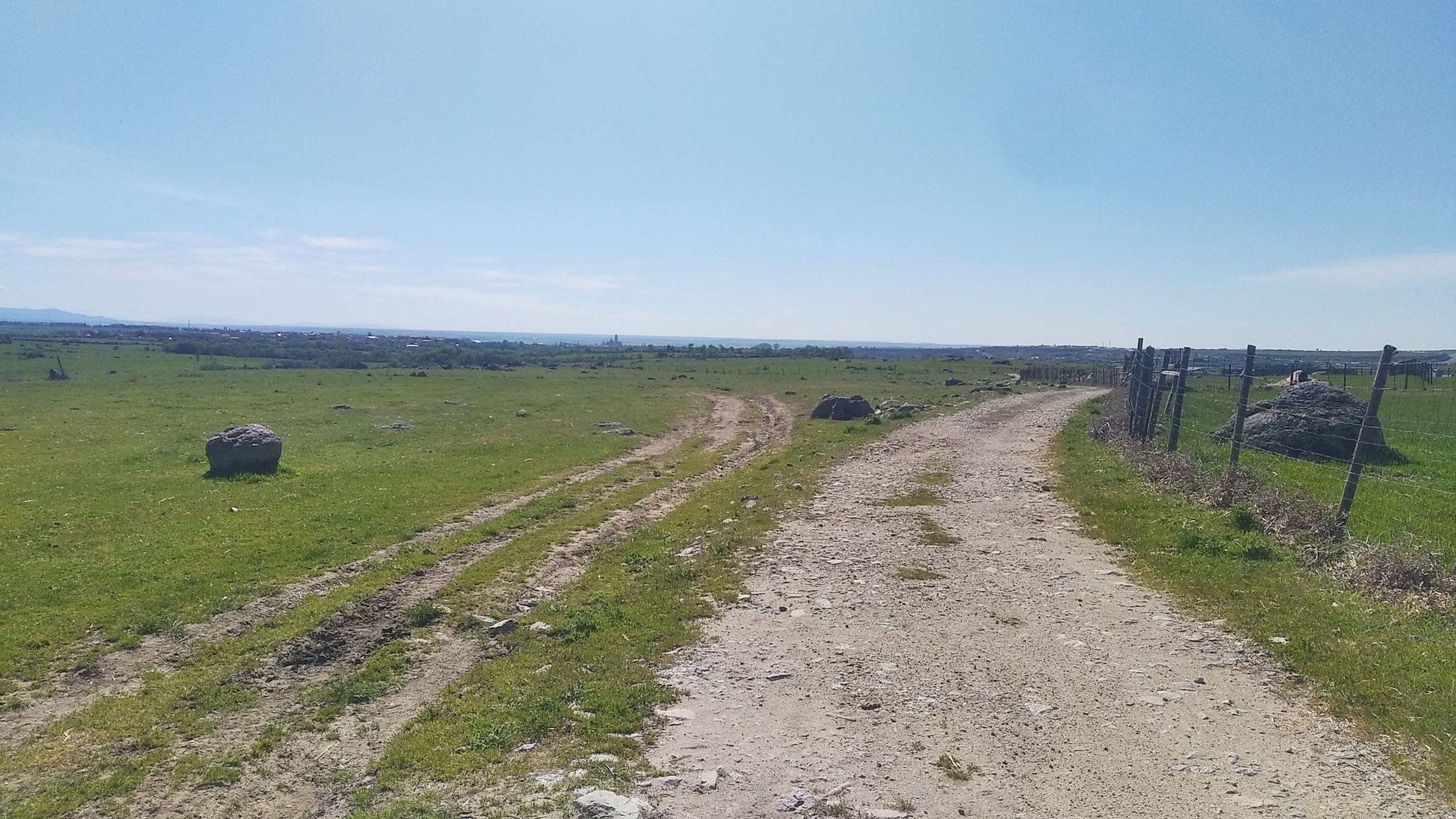
Trescasas Way

==== Roads ====
- SG-20: Motorway running around Segovia, between the A-601 and the N-110 towards Ávila.
- Provincial road SG-V-6123 connects the municipality to Segovia and Trescasas.
- Provincial road SG-V-6125, connects the municipality to Tabanera del Monte, a town in Palazuelos de Eremsa.
- Trescasas Way, connecting the municipality to Trescasas.
- San Antonio Way, connecting to Tabanera del Monte.
- Corredores Way, or Segovia Way, providing another connection to Segovia.
- La Lastrilla Way, connecting to La Lastrilla.

==== Buses ====
Map of the Segovia Metropolitan bus network.

San Cristóbal de Segovia is part of the Segovia Metropolitan Transportation Network, a bus network that connects Segovia to its surrounding towns.

Line	Route
M6	Aldehuela - Torrecaballeros - Cabanillas del Monte - Trescasas - Sonsoto - San Cristóbal - Montecorredores - Segovia
M6*	Aldehuela - Torrecaballeros - Cabanillas del Monte - Trescasas - Sonsoto - San Cristóbal - Tabanera del Monte - Palazuelos de Eresma - Segovia

== Culture ==
=== Historical Sites ===
- Parish Church of Nuestra Señora del Rosario, from the 20th Century.
- Medieval Irrigation Canals from the Cambrones River.
- Remains of the Saint Anthony of Padua hermitage.
- Remains of old Roman church, now a Cemetery.
- Historic livestock gate, on the eastern end of the town.

=== Festivals ===
- Cacera Mayor day, celebrated on the last Saturday of May.
- Festival for Saint Anthony of Padua. 13 June.
- Youth Festival, first weekend of July.
- Festival to Our Lady of the Rosary, first weekend of October.
- Festival of Municipal Separation, or Festival of the Constitution. 25 November.

Legends

There are multiple legends in the area around Segovia, such as El Tuerto de Pirón, the creation of La Mujer Muerta a mountain near to the municipality, and Bloody Mary.
