= Trescasas =

- Municipality
- Flag Coat of arms

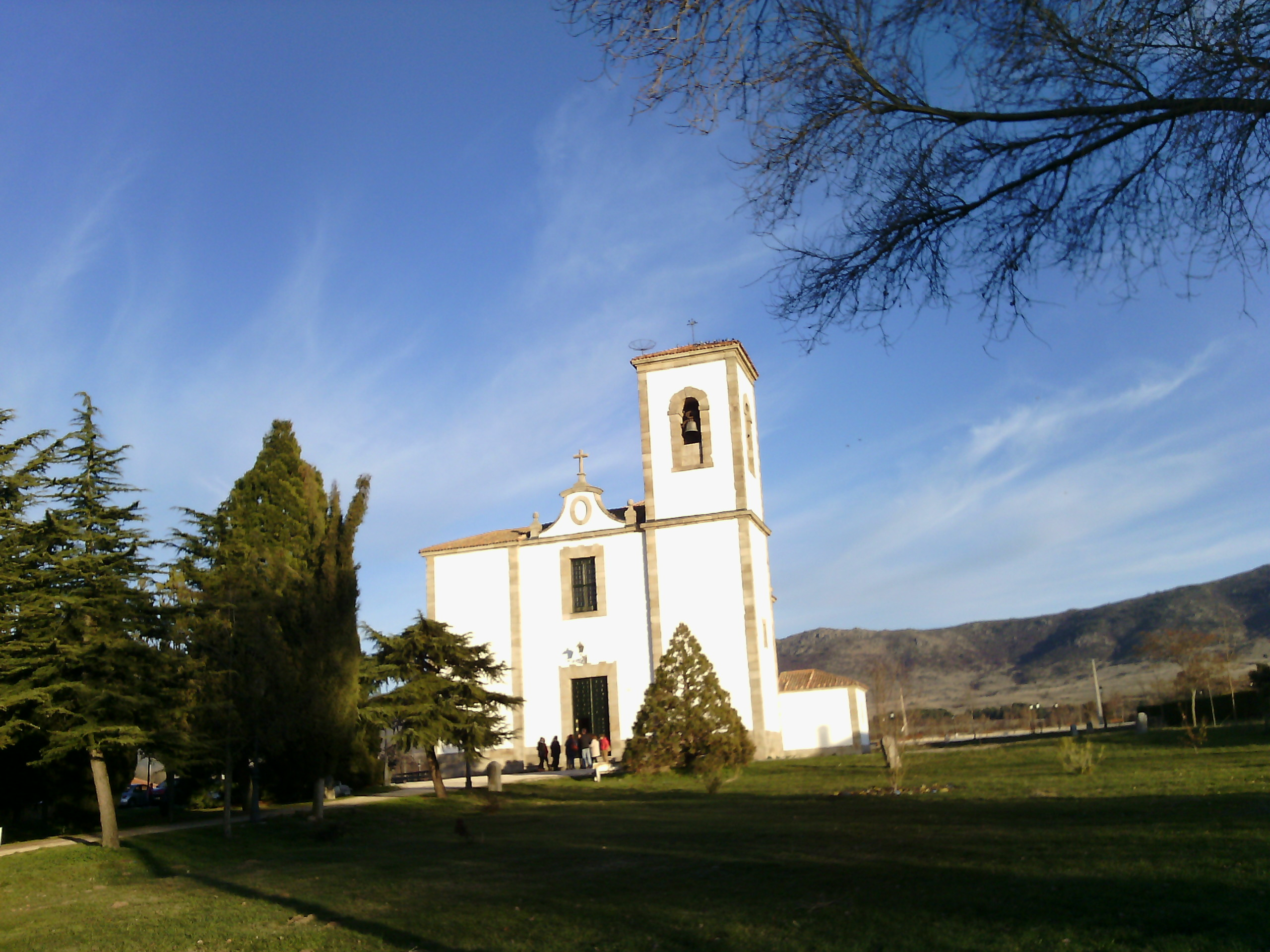

- Location in Spain. Trescasas (Spain)
- Coordinates: 40°57′31″N 4°02′16″W
- Country: Spain
- Autonomous community: Castile and León
- Province: Segovia
- Municipality: Trescasas

Government
  - Mayor: Borja Lavandera Alonso ( PSOE)

Area
  - Total: 34.41 km^{2} (13.29 sq mi)

Population (2025-01-01)
  - Total: 1,130
  - Density: 32.8/km^{2} (85.1/sq mi)
- Time zone: UTC+1 (CET)
  - Summer (DST): UTC+2 (CEST)
- Website: Official website

Trescasas is a municipality located in the province of Segovia, Castile and León, Spain. According to the 2022 census (INE), the municipality has a population of 1090 inhabitants.

== Geography ==
=== Location ===
It borders to the north with Espirdo, Cabanillas del Monte and Torrecaballeros, to the south with Palazuelos de Eresma, to the east with the province of Madrid and to the west with La Lastrilla and San Cristóbal de Segovia.

=== Climate ===
According to the Köppen climatic classification, Trescasas falls within the Csb variant, that is, a Mediterranean climate with oceanic influence, with mild and dry summers, with the mean of the warmest month not exceeding 22 °C.

Climate data for Trescasas 1961-2003 1,121 metres (3,678 ft)
Month	Jan	Feb	Mar	Apr	May	Jun	Jul	Aug	Sep	Oct	Nov	Dec	Year
Record high °C (°F)	4.10 (39.38)	5.30 (41.54)	7.70 (45.86)	9.30 (48.74)	13.30 (55.94)	18.10 (64.58)	21.70 (71.06)	21.50 (70.70)	17.90 (64.22)	12.60 (54.68)	7.40 (45.32)	4.60 (40.28)	21.70 (71.06)
Average precipitation mm (inches)	46.40 (1.83)	29.10 (1.15)	30.70 (1.21)	42.00 (1.65)	53.90 (2.12)	37.00 (1.46)	17.50 (0.69)	15.50 (0.61)	32.90 (1.30)	48.80 (1.92)	54.80 (2.16)	41.40 (1.63)	450 (17.73)
Source: Ministry of Agriculture and Fisheries, Food and Environment. Precipitation data (1961-2003) and temperature (1961-2003)
