= El Tuerto de Pirón =

Spanish bandit

- Portrait drawn by the Civil Guard in 1870
- Born: Fernando Delgado Sanz Adrados de Ysabel; May 30, 1846; Santo Domingo de Pirón, Province of Segovia, Spain
- Died: July 5, 1914 (aged 68); San Miguel de los Reyes prison, Valencia, Spain
- Other name: Tuerto Pirón
- Occupation: Bandit
- Years active: 15
- Criminal charges: Homicide, theft, robbery and extortion
- Criminal penalty: Life imprisonment
- Partner: Dolores (until 1866)

Fernando Delgado Sanz (May 30, 1846 – July 5, 1914), better known as El Tuerto del Pirón or Tuerto Pirón, was a Spanish bandit. He worked mainly in the Sierra de Guadarrama and in the Río Pirón basin.

== Biography ==
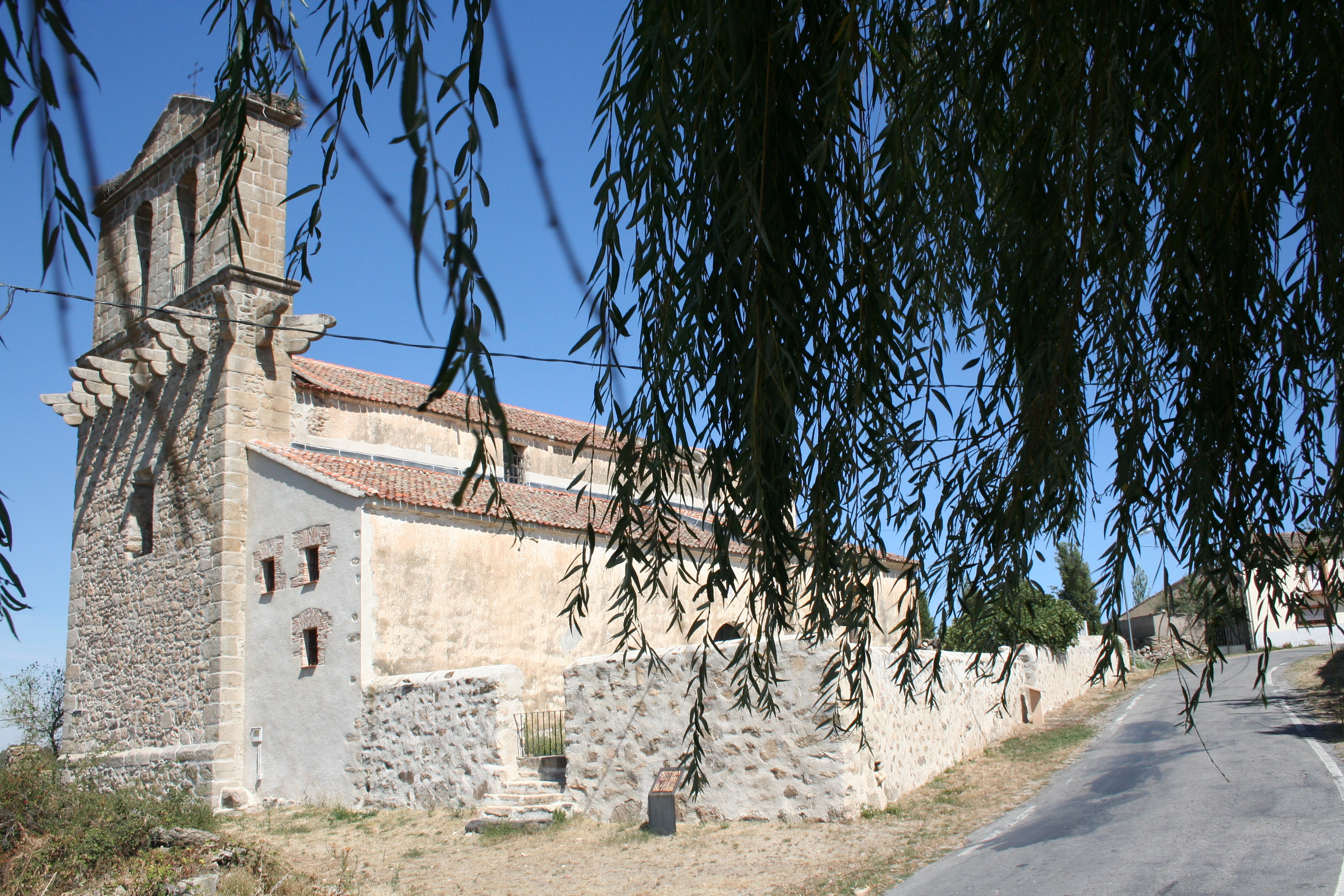
Church of Santo Domingo de Pirón, in which he was baptized on June 6, 1846.

=== Childhood ===
He was born in May 1846 in Santo Domingo de Pirón as the son of Ramón Delgado Adrados, a native of Escalona del Prado, and Ana Sanz de Ysabel, of Santo Domingo de Pirón.

=== Initiation ===
In 1866 he returned to his hometown at the end of his military service and discovered that his girlfriend in the village had married a man from a rich and influential family.

It was then that he began his criminal career with his first crime, stealing the best lamb from the father of his former girlfriend and eating it with his friends in a cave in the Losana de Pirón area. He mocked and ridiculed the father by leaving the remains and skin of the animal at his door along with the text, "for the godfather." The story spread and he quickly became famous in the whole area.

=== Crimes ===
After he committed his first crime, an influential person immediately asked the Civil Guard to hunt him down, so he lived as a robber, hiding in the Caves of the Vaquera and Murciganillos in Losana de Pirón and the old elm of Rascafría. His crimes included the theft of cattle, robbery of rich houses and churches, assaults on walkers and travelers, and the kidnapping for ransom of members of the bourgeoisie, nobility and clergy. He formed a band with rustlers from the area including some childhood friends. Their crimes became more and more serious and widespread. Despite the murky stories that were told about his deeds, he only committed one murder and allowed another by one of his companions, both traitors of the gang. Unlike most bandits, he was disgusted with blood.

One of his most famous crimes was the complicated church robbery of Tenzuela, in which he entering through the roof without leaving a single trace.

=== Death ===
He died at age 68 on July 5, 1914, after being imprisoned for 26 years in the San Miguel de los Reyes Prison, Valencia province.

== Description ==
El Tuerto del Pirón was described as follows by the Civil Guard:

Age, 35 years; stature, rather tall than short; wide and loaded on his back; Wide face; color, brown; shaved beard; with a little mustache. As a particular sign, a cataract in the left eye. He wears blue trousers, a brown cloth waistcoat, and a long checkered jacket or jacket; good black boots, and a wide hat or blue beret much used.

According to an article published on August 16, 1921, in El Adelantado de Segovia, he would often walk through the city calmly greeting the Segovian citizens as they recognized him, but they were speechless with fear:

The famous Segovian bandit did not shy away from appearing in public; taking, on the way, a seat in the cars of the land and getting off where he seemed. Courteously saying goodbye to the passengers who had recognized him, but who were careful to let him know to avoid dangerous inconveniences.

== Reino of the Tuerto ==
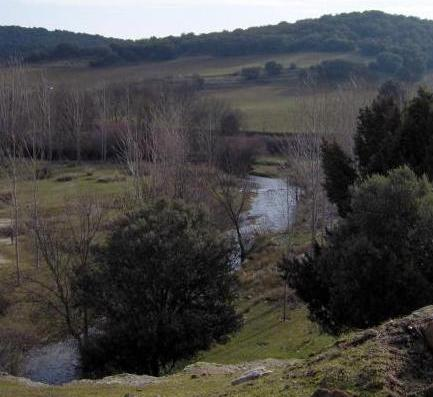
Río Pirón as it passed through Peñarrubias de Pirón, one of the places over which he had the most control.

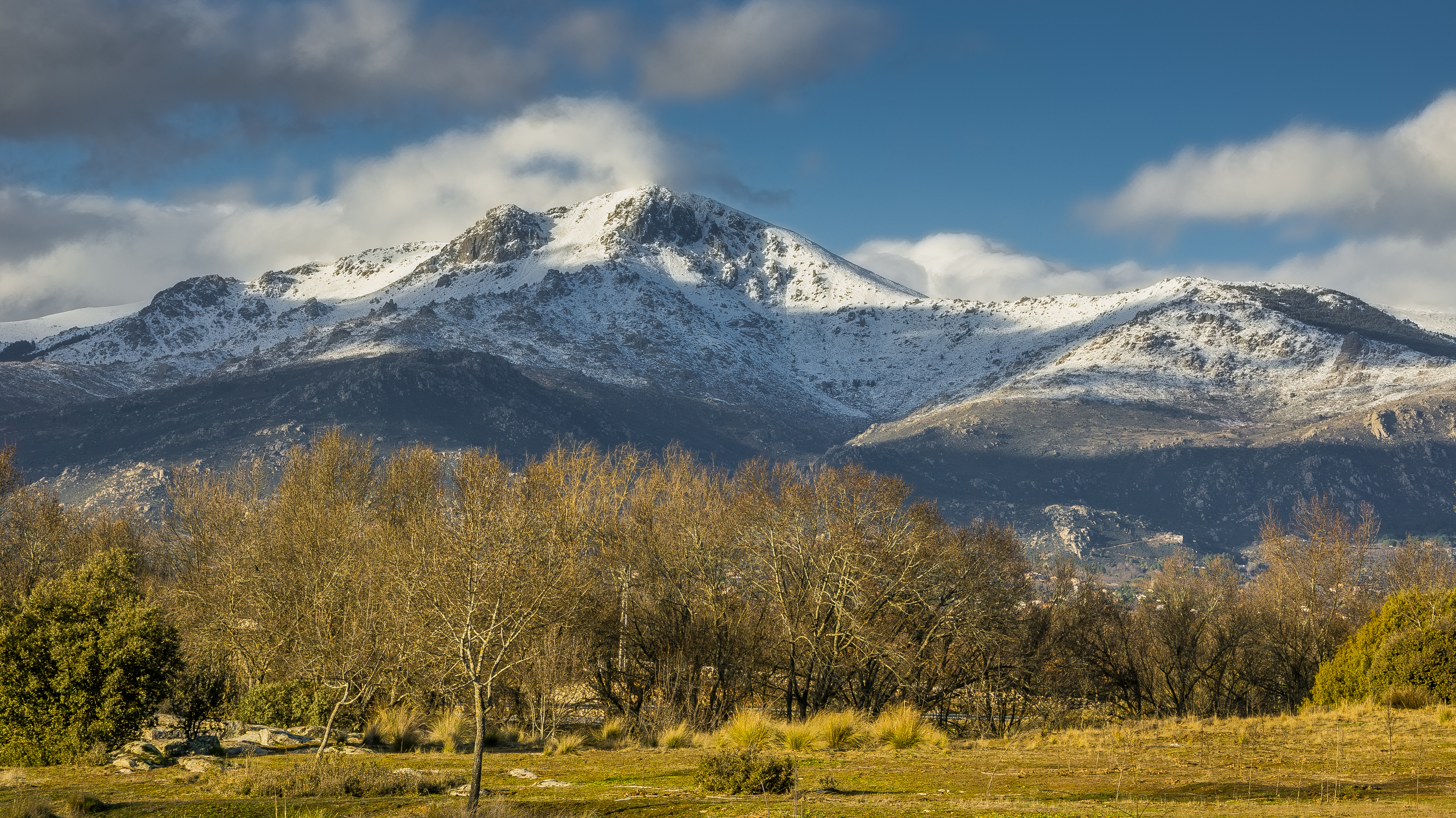
The Sierra de Guadarrama controlled on both slopes by the one-eyed man

He created a small band of rustlers among his childhood friends and others from the town of Espirdo, Segovia and Madrid. The most important were Barroso, Aquilino Benito Pérez, Consuegra and two brothers called Los Tormenta.

Their zone of power was called El Reino del Tuerto or País del Tuerto because of the power and control they exerted over the place. It extended throughout the region of the river Pirón, the valleys of Río Viejo, that of Lozoya and that of the Río Pirón up to Pedraza, part of the Cega river basin in addition to both slopes (Madrid and Segovia) of the Sierra de Guadarrama. His crimes were famous throughout the province of Segovia and Madrid, for instance in the town of Rascafría where he was known for hiding in its centenary elm. He also was in towns as close to the Segovian capital as Tres Casas (now Trescasas) and Sonsoto, although in the latter two he was unsuccessful. Some of his actions were carried out in neighboring municipalities of the province of Valladolid with the province of Segovia. On both sides of the Sierra de Guadarrama he was known, sought after and highly feared.

== Popular culture ==
There are several rural houses and restaurants with his name in the area where he once took refuge. His feats are described in numerous verses and romances in the popular culture of the area, such as the "Copla del Tuerto Pirón" and the book Romances of El Tuerto de Pirón by Tomás Calleja. A street in Santo Domingo de Pirón now bears his name. His figure and history have also been used by public institutions with the aim of rehabilitating inmates from the Segovia jail.

== Bibliography ==
- Romances of El Tuerto de Pirón (Tomás Calleja Guijarro, SG - 102/2005)
- Famous Bandits Una Información (A. Suarez Guillén - nº 13.943 1930)
