= Cabanillas del Monte =

Coordinates: 40°59′N 4°02′W

- Municipality
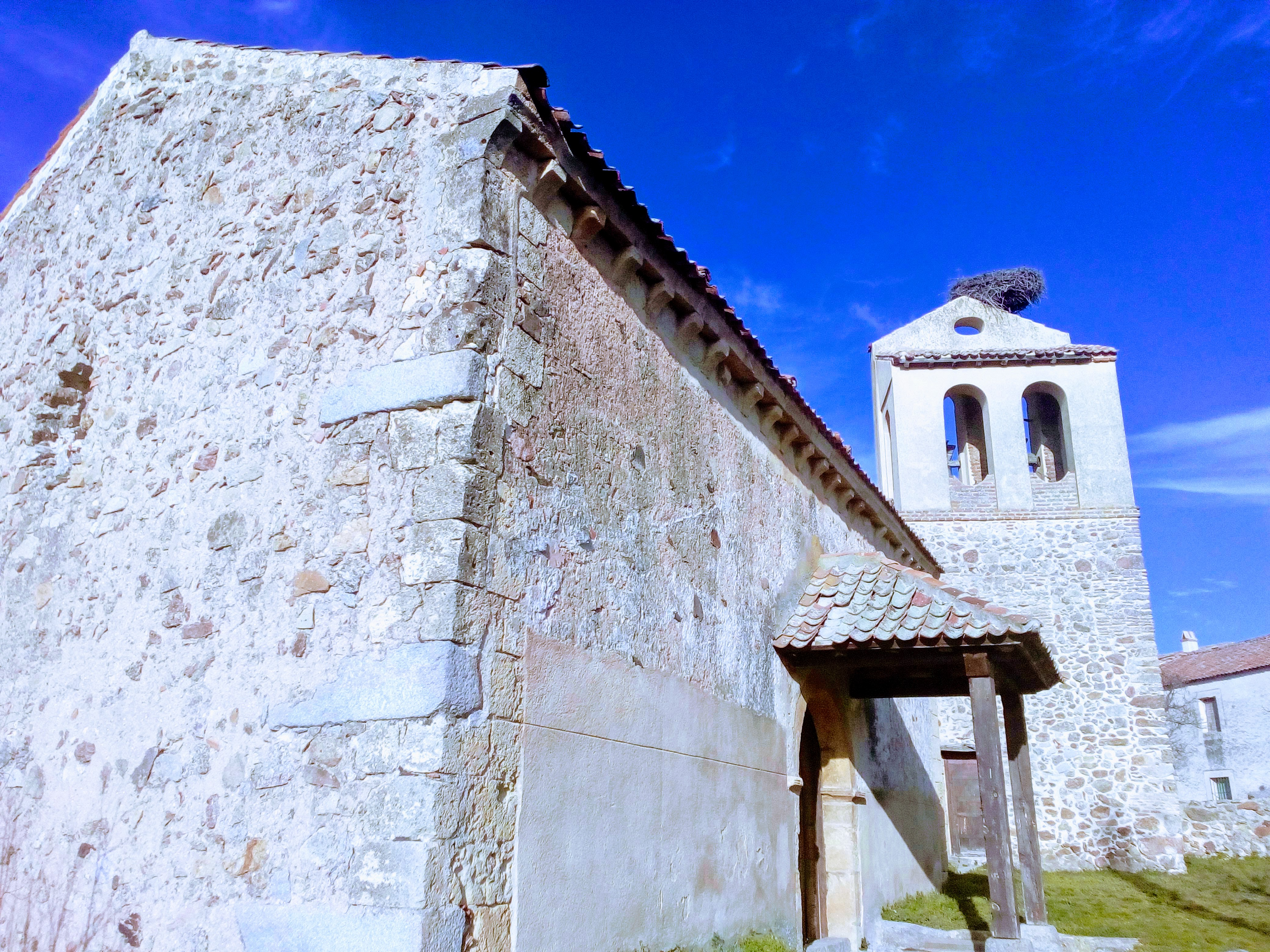

- Location in Spain. Cabanillas del Monte (Spain)
- Country: Spain
- Autonomous community: Castile and León
- Province: Segovia
- Municipality: Torrecaballeros
- Elevation: 1,150 m (3,770 ft)

Population (2022)
  - Total: 53
- Demonym(s): cabanillero, -a del monte
- Time zone: UTC+1 (CET)
  - Summer (DST): UTC+2 (CEST)
- Postal code: 40160

Cabanillas del Monte is a city and a municipality which belongs to the municipality of Torrecaballeros, located in the province of Segovia, Castile and León, Spain. According to the 2022 census (INE), the locality has a population of 53 inhabitants.

== Toponymy ==
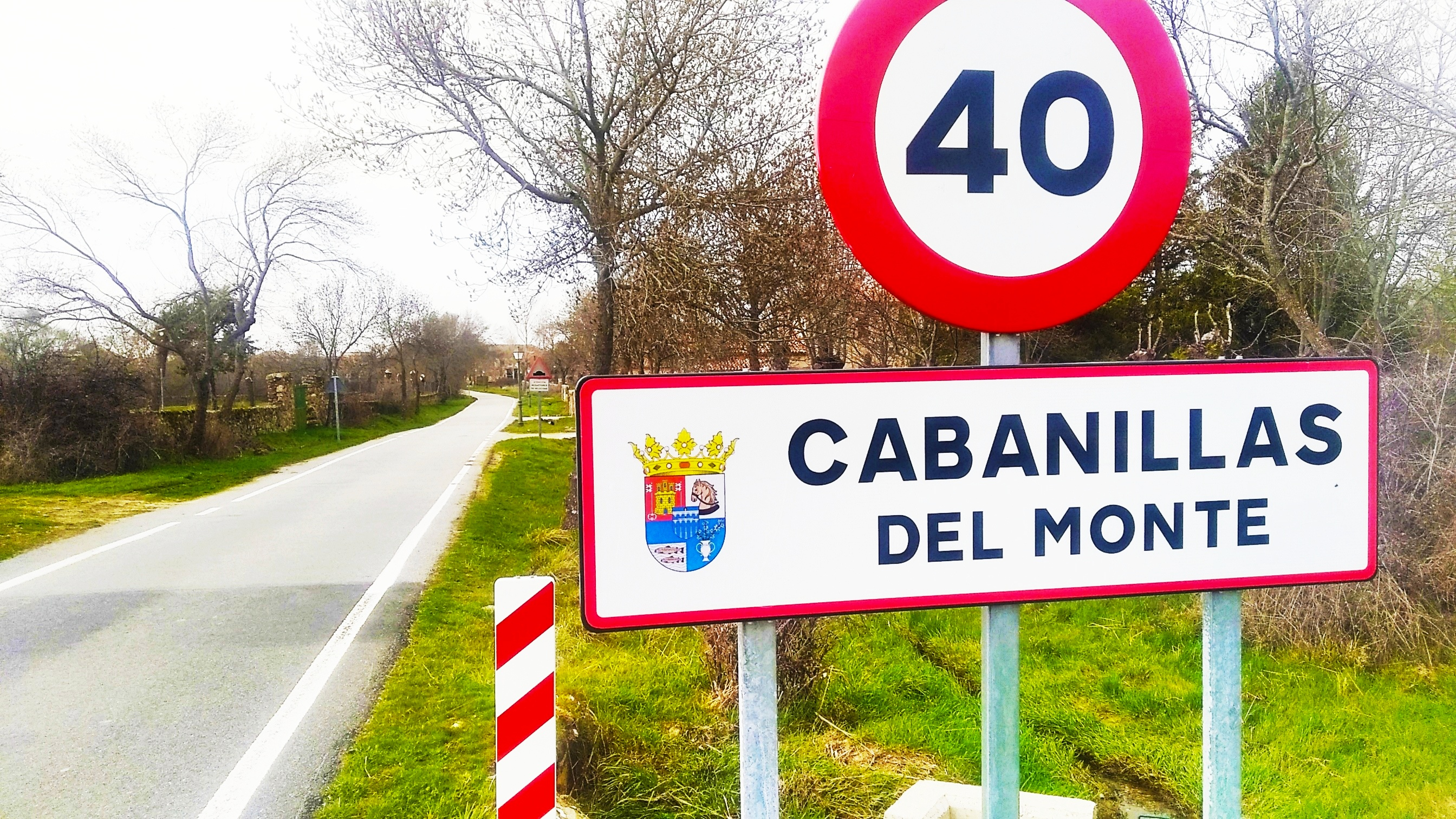
Name of the town on the sign indicating the entrance to the urbanized area

In 1247 it was mentioned as Cabaniellas del Monte and in the Ensenada Cadastre (1752) it was mentioned as Cabañuelas, Torrecavalleros neighborhood. The word "Cabanillas" derives from the Latin capannelas, diminutive of capanna —of possible pre-Roman origin due to the suffix -anna—, with the meaning of cabin, farm where cattle are raised or stable for the herd.

In the villages of the mountains, the houses or ranches with large corrals are still called cabins where cattle are sheared. In 1916 there was one of the few shearing yards that remained standing here, the one called Rancho de la Marquesa, which in the early 20th century maps was called Rancho de D. Tomás Mascaró. The place name is also repeated in Cabañas de Polendos and Cabanillas de Pirón (Adrada de Pirón). As for the word "Mount", it would refer to its location next to a mountain or forest.

== Geography ==
=== Location ===
The entrance to Cabanillas is located on the P-6121 road that connects La Granja de San Ildefonso with the N-110 in Torrecaballeros.

==== Limits ====
It limits to the north with Espirdo and Torrecaballeros, to the south with Trescasas, to the east with the province of Madrid and to the west with Tizneros.

== Fauna and Flora ==
The area is mostly grasslands and abundant thorny shrubs, few specimens of shrub oak and reforestation pine forests. As aromatic species we have salsero thyme, white thyme, lavender.

== Heritage ==
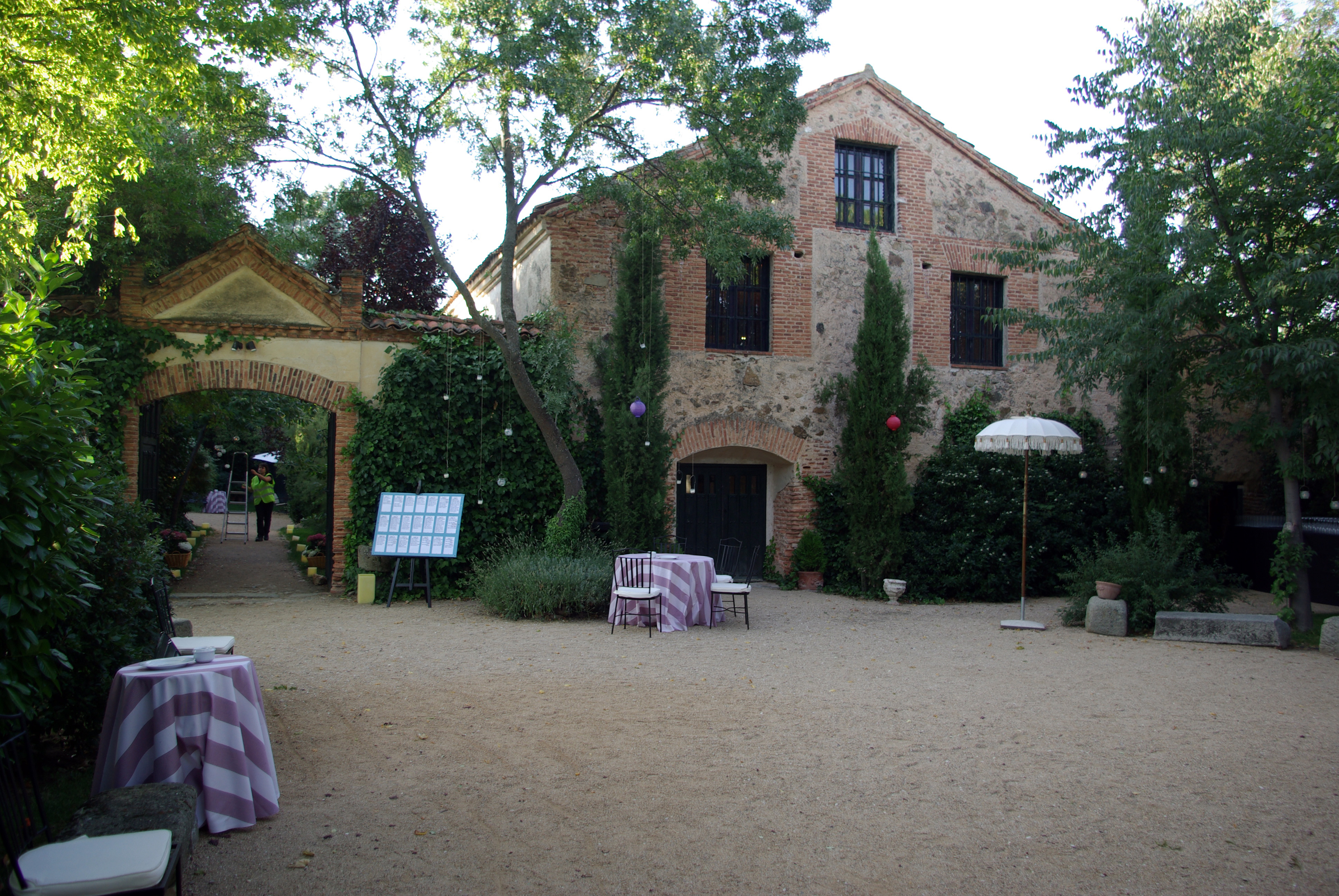
Main facade of the Cabanillas Shearing House

- Cabanillas Shearing House declared an Asset of Cultural Interest on February 6, 1997. The building dates back to the 16th century and was rebuilt in the 18th century and is now converted into a private farmhouse for celebrations.
- Iglesia de San Miguel, a single-vaulted Romanesque building, built during the 13th century, with Renaissance additions.
- Rancho de la Marquesa, an old cabanillas enclosure and laundry located next to the Cañada Real Soriana Occidental.
- The Museo del Pastor del Agua exhibition and dissemination and research center of the traditional culture of water and linen, projected for June 2021.
- Bridge of the Five Lights over the Ciguiñuela River.
- Foal of shoeing located next to the church.
- Watering trough (Spanish: pílon) near the shear house.

== Holidays ==
- September 22, 29 and 30: Saint Michel Archangel.
