= Santo Domingo de Pirón =

- Municipality
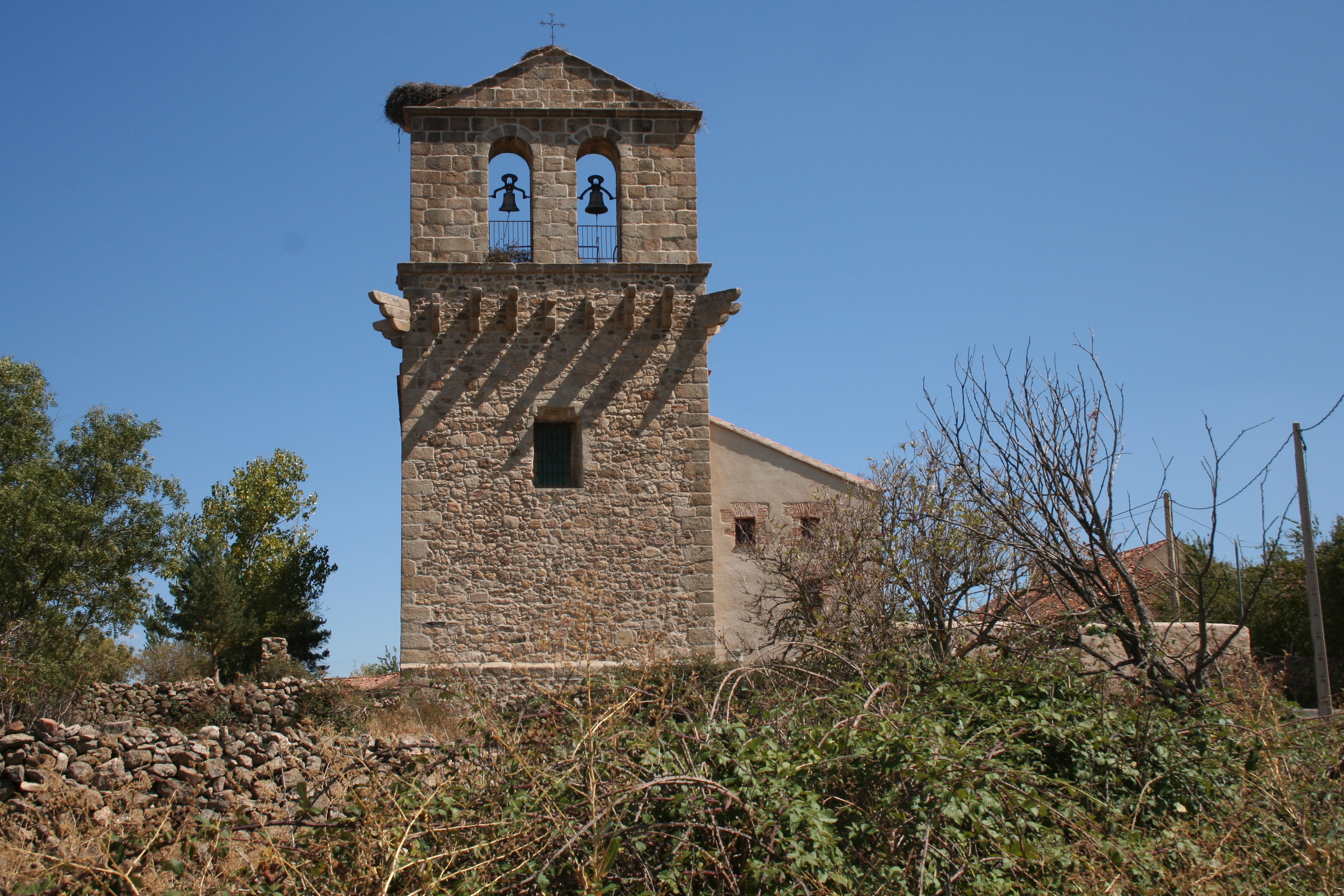
- Church of Santo Domingo (Santo Domingo de Pirón, Segovia, Spain).

- Location in Spain. Santo Domingo de Pirón (Spain)
- Coordinates: 41°02′28″N 3°59′22″W
- Country: Spain
- Autonomous community: Castile and León
- Province: Segovia
- Municipality: Santo Domingo de Pirón

Area
  - Total: 27 km^{2} (10 sq mi)

Population (2020)
  - Total: 53
  - Density: 2.0/km^{2} (5.1/sq mi)
- Time zone: UTC+1 (CET)
  - Summer (DST): UTC+2 (CEST)
- Website: Official website

Santo Domingo de Pirón is a municipality located in the province of Segovia, Castile and León, Spain. According to the 2020 census (INE), the municipality has a population of 53 inhabitants.

== Monuments ==
- Church of Santo Domingo
- Parish Church of Santo Domingo de Silos, with a semicircular chevet from the Romanesque period and preserves the sculptural corbels (heads of the beams) on the cornice. Its belfry (a single-walled bell tower with open holes to place the campaigns) is also perfectly preserved, where its nest of storks cannot be absent.
- Shearing-laundry of Alfaro or Rancho Alfaro, as it is known in the area. It is one of the most important shearing remains in the province. The Rancho Alfaro was ordered to be built by José Alfaro, around 1750.
- Old stone mill
- Shoeing foal
- Facades with different types of sgraffito.

== Holidays ==
- San Isidro: May 15
- San Antonio: June 13
- San Roque: between August 10 and 15
- The Virgin of the Rosary: in October
- Santo Domingo de Silos: December 20.

== Legends ==
- El Tuerto de Pirón Legend of the Tuerto de Pirón. Fernando Delgado Sanz, better known as El Tuerto de Pirón was a bandit born in 1846 in Santo Domingo de Pirón. He robbed the rich, raided churches and roads, acted mainly in the Sierra de Guadarrama and in the Río Pirón basin, although his stories are famous throughout the province of Segovia and part of Madrid. According to the story in 1866, when he returned to Santo Domingo de Pirón at the end of his military service, his girlfriend named Paula Adrados with whom he was engaged, he had married after family pressure. So he decided to start his career by stealing and humiliating the father of his girlfriend who was a chief of the area. A coplaque was sung throughout the area that read:

In Santo Domingo de Pirón every neighbor is a thief; less at the mayor's house; that the son and the father are.
