= La Vaquera Cave =

Cave with Neolithic remains in Segovia, Spain

- Cueva de La Vaquera (Spanish)
- Cueva de La Fuentedura
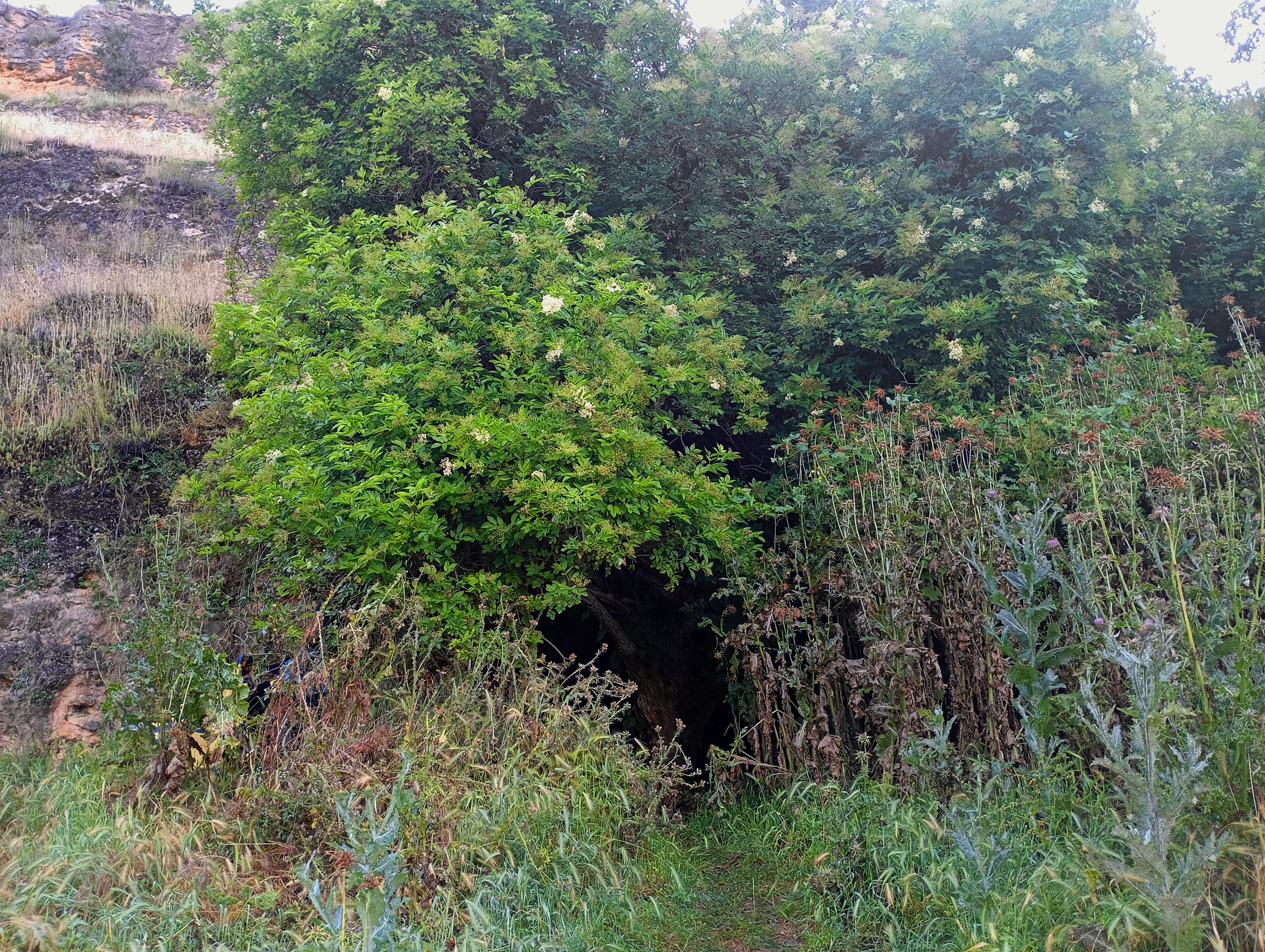
- South entrance to Vaquera Cave from the Pirón River Canyon
- Interactive map of La Vaquera Cave
- 41.0842°N 4.0588°W
- Location: Losana de Pirón (Torreiglesias)
- Region: Segovia Province

Site notes
- Elevation: 960 m (3,150 ft)
- Length: >1 km
- Public access: Yes

La Vaquera or Fuentedura cave is a cavity located in the province of Segovia (Spain), located between the canyons of the Pirón and Viejo rivers in the area of Losana de Pirón (Torreiglesias), at the foot of the Sierra de Guadarrama.

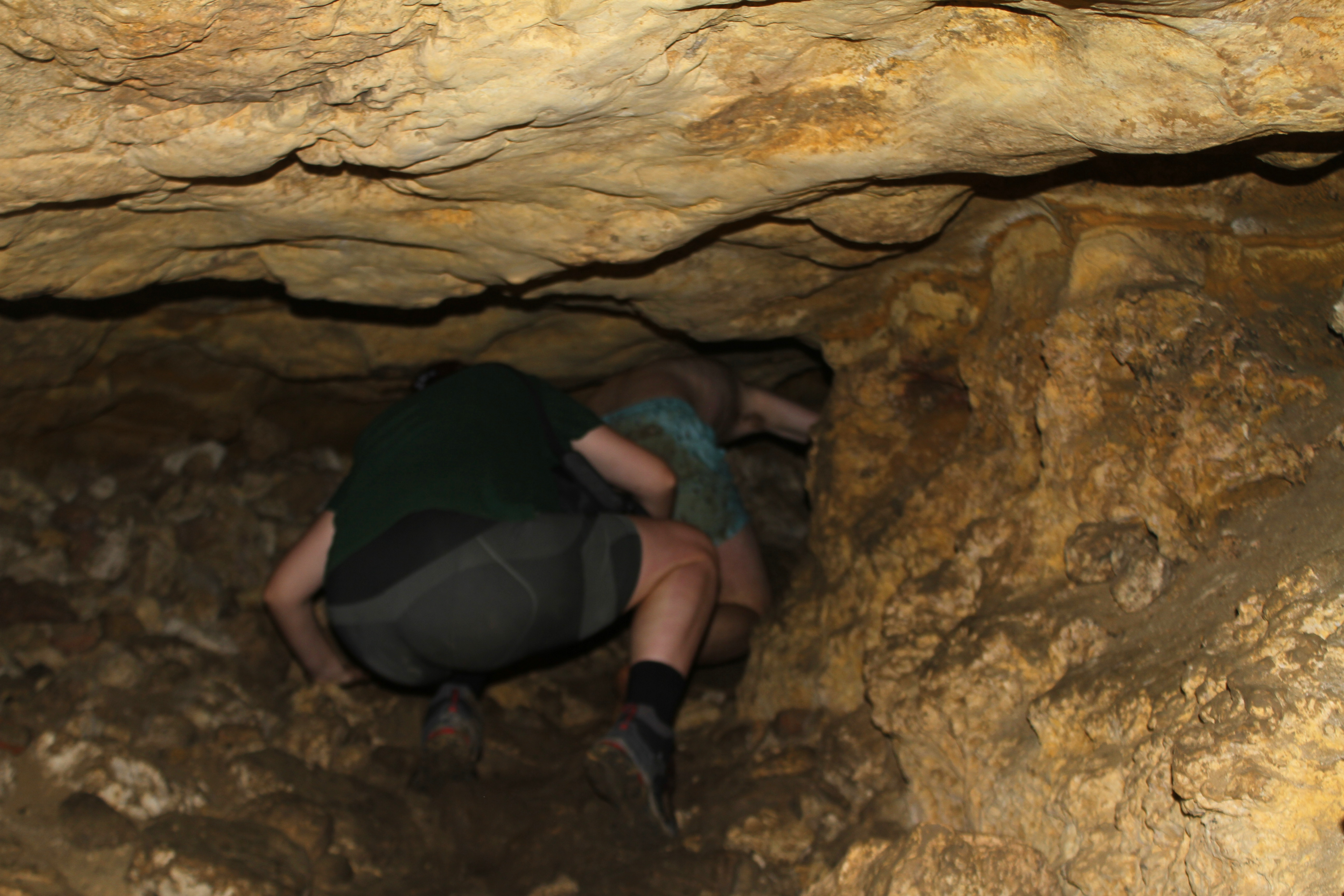
People passing through the interior of the cavity

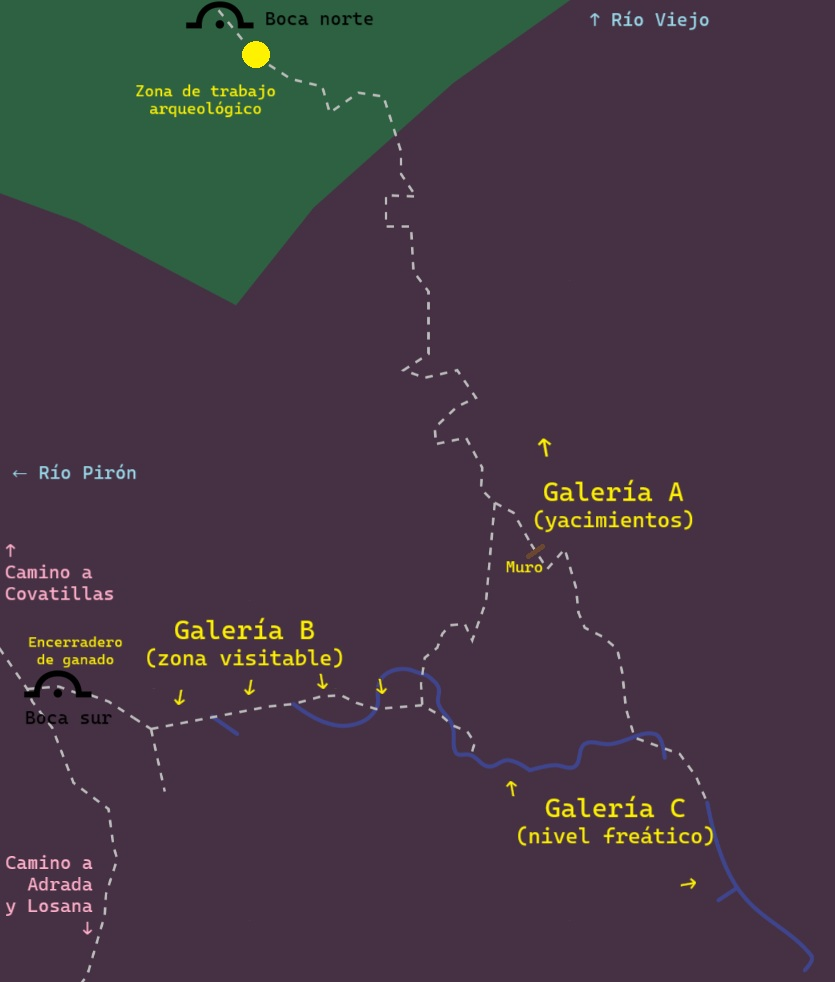
Map showing the various galleries and elements of the Vaquera Cave

Divided into three galleries, it is considered one of the most important caves in Segovia given the presence of human remains from the beginning of the Neolithic to the end of the Iron Age and the Early Middle Ages. It has been key in research into the invention of agriculture, and the oldest wheat in the Iberian Peninsula has been found there. Its mystical importance in regional folklore is immemorial, as is its geological interest within an equally outstanding natural setting.
