= Torreiglesias =

- Municipality
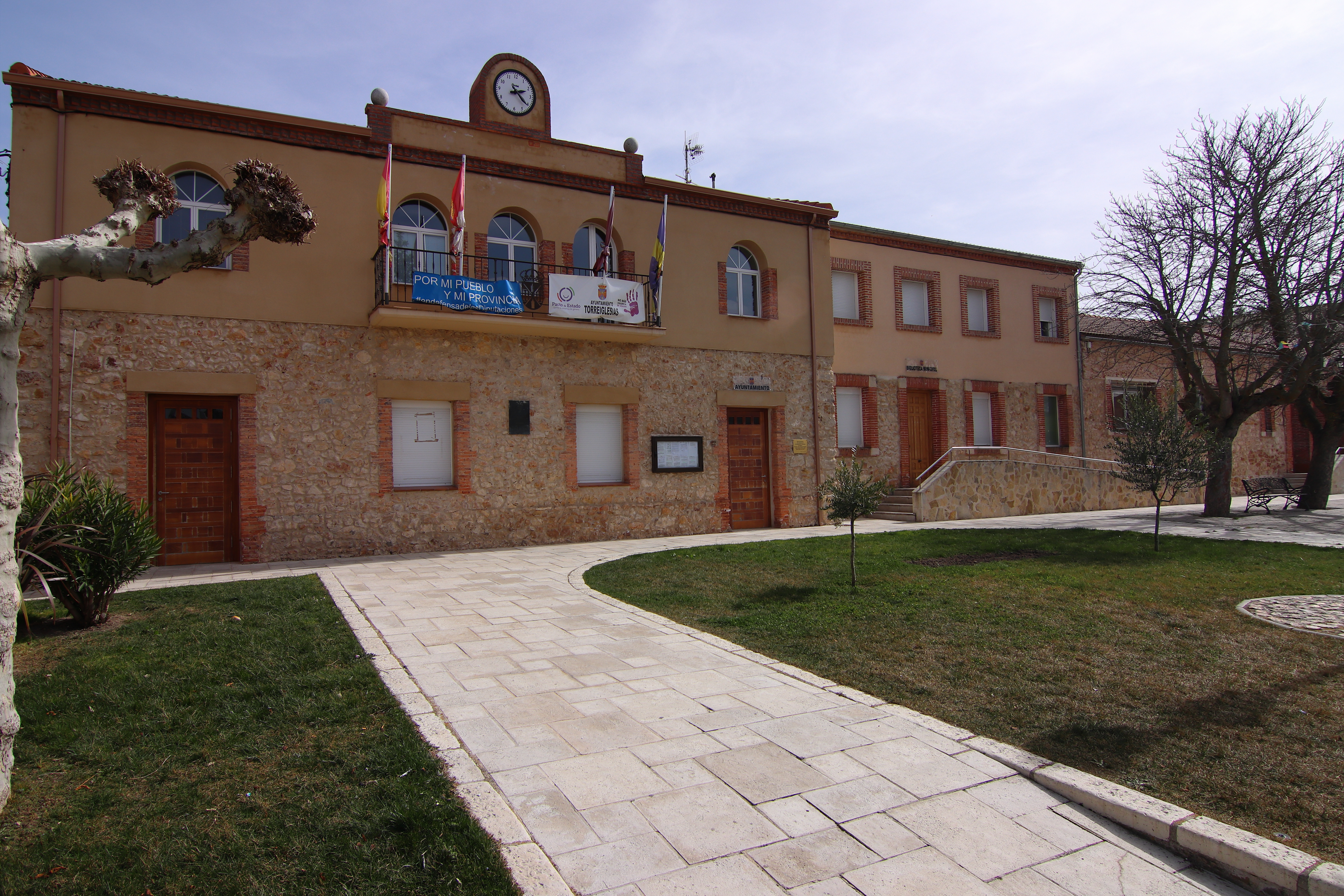
- Torreiglesias Town hall

- Flag Coat of arms

- Location in Spain. Torreiglesias (Spain)
- Coordinates: 41°06′07″N 4°01′57″W
- Country: Spain
- Autonomous community: Castile and León
- Province: Segovia
- Municipality: Torreiglesias

Area
  - Total: 54 km^{2} (21 sq mi)

Population (2025-01-01)
  - Total: 257
  - Density: 4.8/km^{2} (12/sq mi)
- Time zone: UTC+1 (CET)
  - Summer (DST): UTC+2 (CEST)
- Website: Official website

Torreiglesias is a municipality located in the province of Segovia, Castile and León, Spain. According to the 2018 census (INE), the municipality has a population of 260 inhabitants.
