= Cabanillas de la Sierra =

Coordinates: 40°49′N 3°37′W

- Municipality
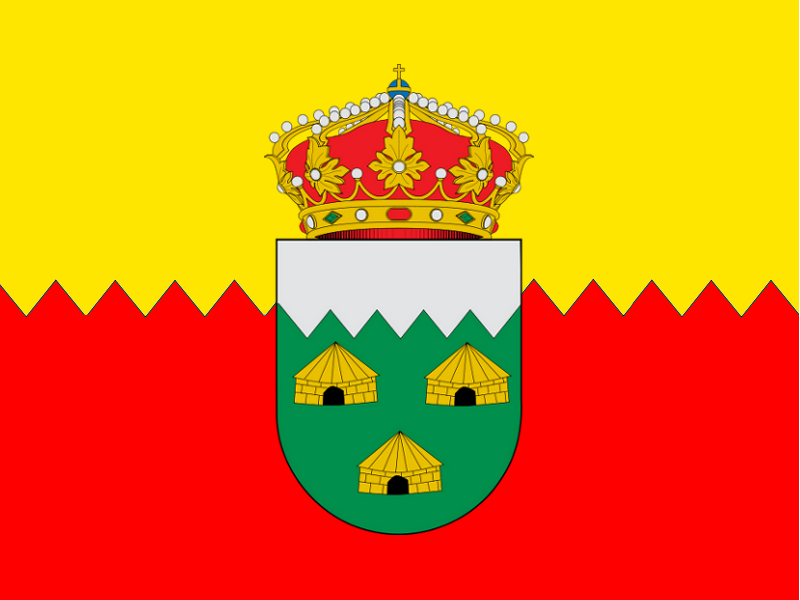
- Flag Coat of arms

- Municipal location within the Community of Madrid.
- Country: Spain
- Autonomous community: Community of Madrid

Area
  - Total: 5.43 sq mi (14.07 km^{2})

Population (2025-01-01)
  - Total: 961
  - Density: 177/sq mi (68.3/km^{2})
- Time zone: UTC+1 (CET)
  - Summer (DST): UTC+2 (CEST)

Cabanillas de la Sierra (Spanish pronunciation: [kaβaˈniʎas ðe la ˈsjera]) is a municipality of the autonomous community of Madrid, Spain. It has an area of 14.07 km^{2}.
