= Alentisque =

- Municipality
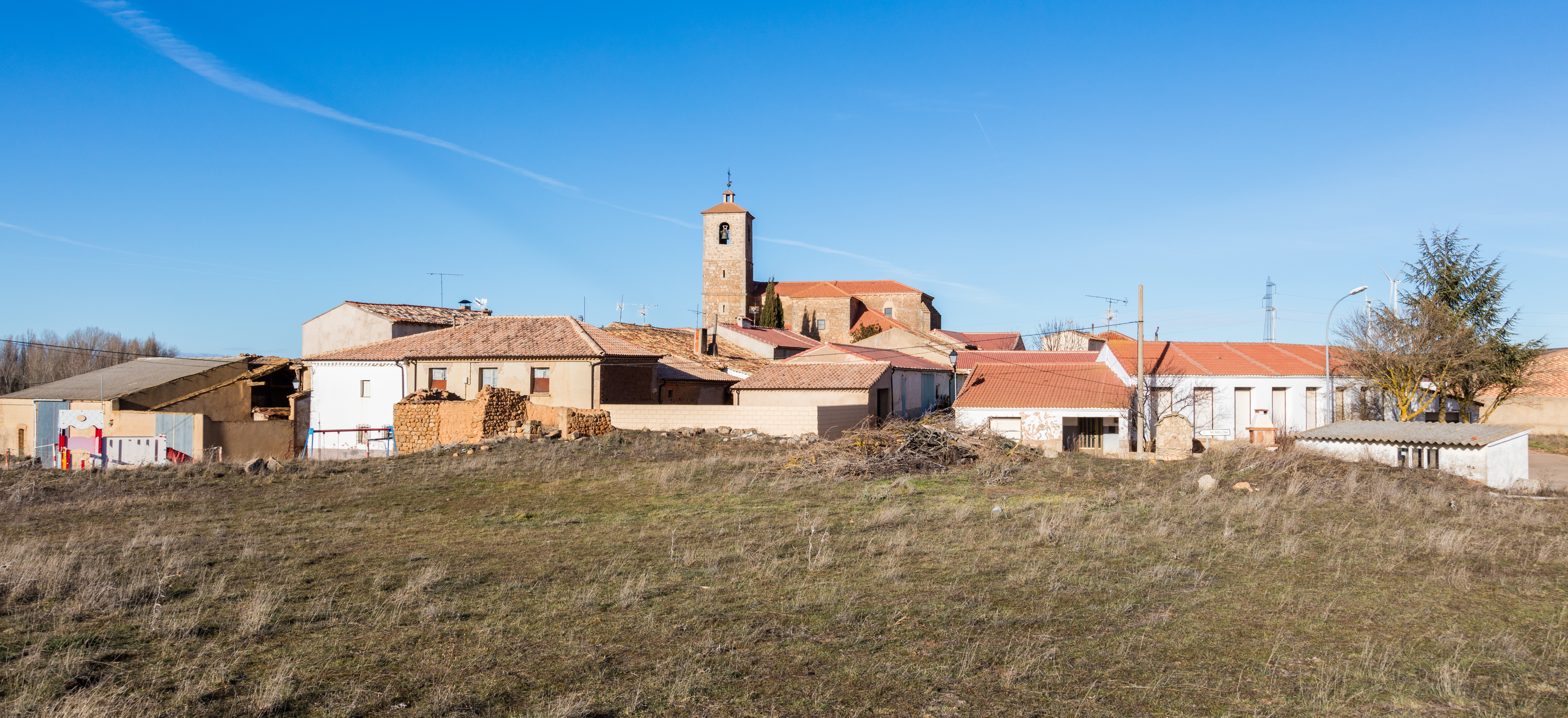

- Location in Spain. Alentisque (Spain)
- Country: Spain
- Autonomous community: Castile and León
- Province: Soria
- Municipality: Alentisque

Area
  - Total: 34.97 km^{2} (13.50 sq mi)

Population (2025-01-01)
  - Total: 23
  - Density: 0.66/km^{2} (1.7/sq mi)
- Time zone: UTC+1 (CET)
  - Summer (DST): UTC+2 (CEST)

Alentisque is a municipality located in the province of Soria, Castile and León, Spain. According to the 2018 census (INE), the municipality had a population of 33 inhabitants.
