= Palazuelos de Eresma =

- Municipality
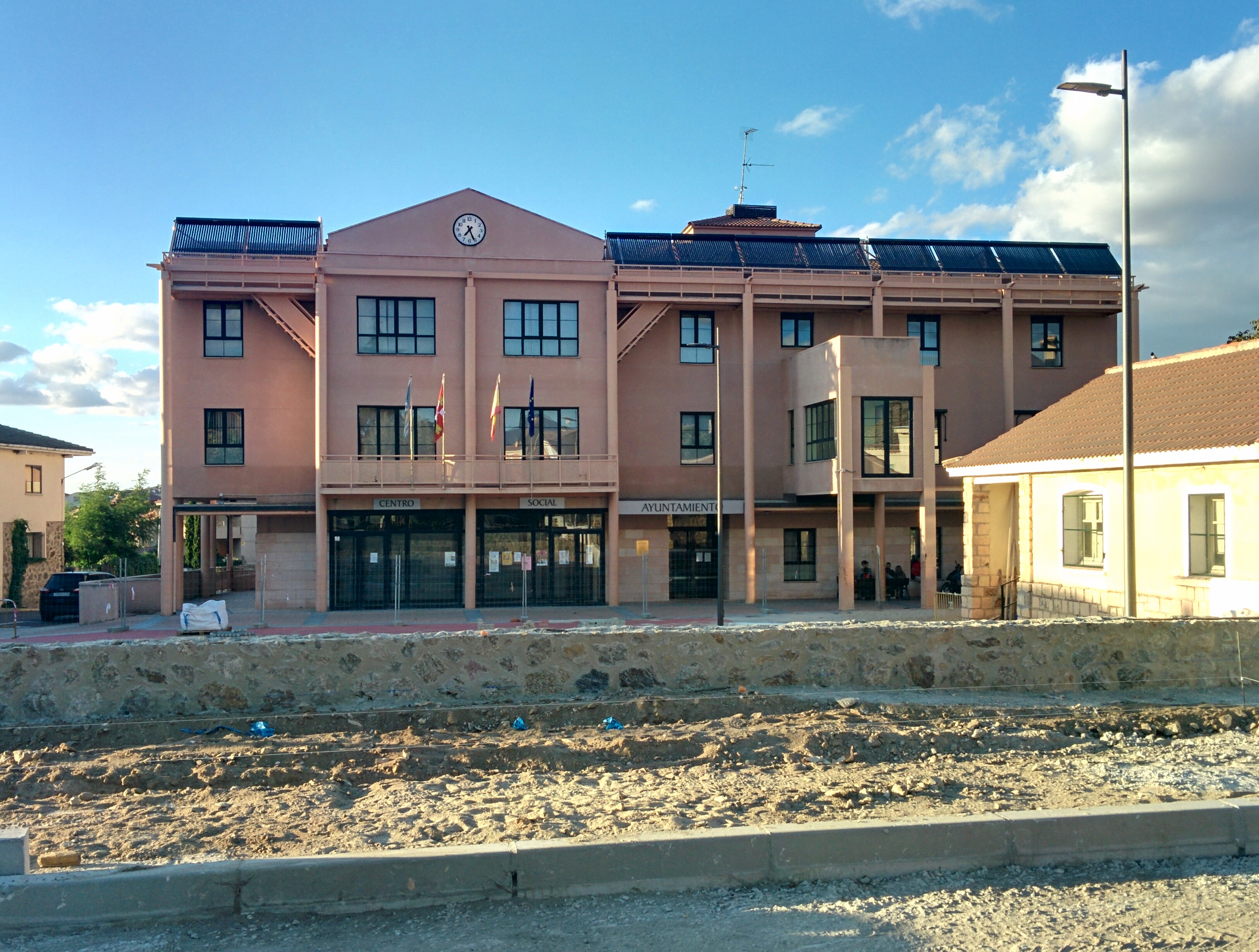
- Town Hall of Palazuelos de Eresma

- Flag Coat of arms

- Location in Spain. Palazuelos de Eresma (Spain)
- Coordinates: 40°55′49″N 4°03′40″W
- Country: Spain
- Autonomous community: Castile and León
- Province: Segovia
- Municipality: Palazuelos de Eresma

Area
  - Total: 36.70 km^{2} (14.17 sq mi)
- Elevation: 1,079 m (3,540 ft)

Population (2025-01-01)
  - Total: 6,107
  - Density: 166.4/km^{2} (431.0/sq mi)
- Time zone: UTC+1 (CET)
  - Summer (DST): UTC+2 (CEST)
- Climate: Csb
- Website: Official website

Palazuelos de Eresma is a municipality located in the province of Segovia, Castile and León, Spain. It takes its name from the River Eresma.

== Demography ==
According to the 2021 census (INE), the municipality had a population of 5830.

== Culture ==
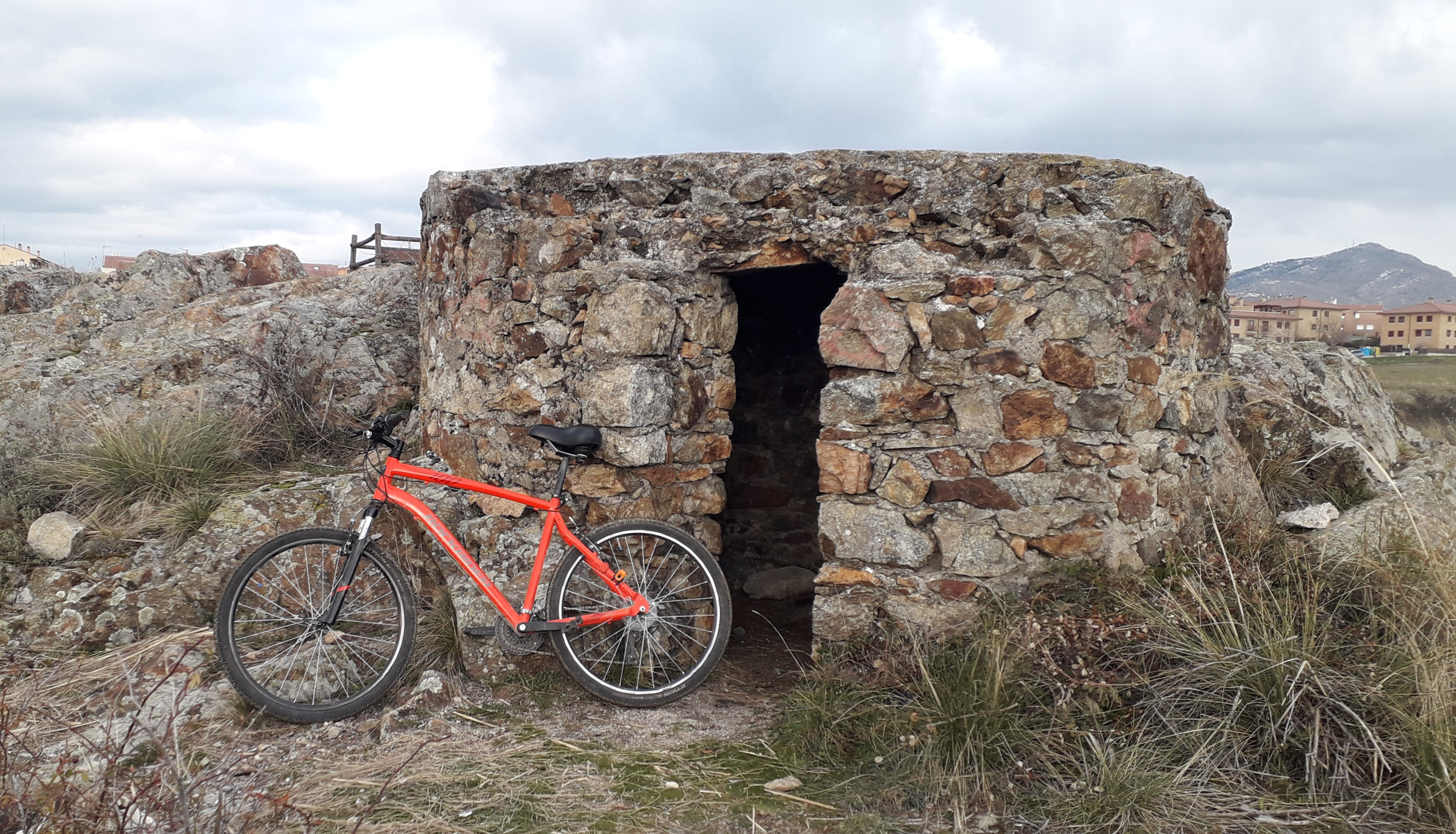
The Barbers bunker from the Civil War, located in the Balcón de Pilatos area next to the Eresma River

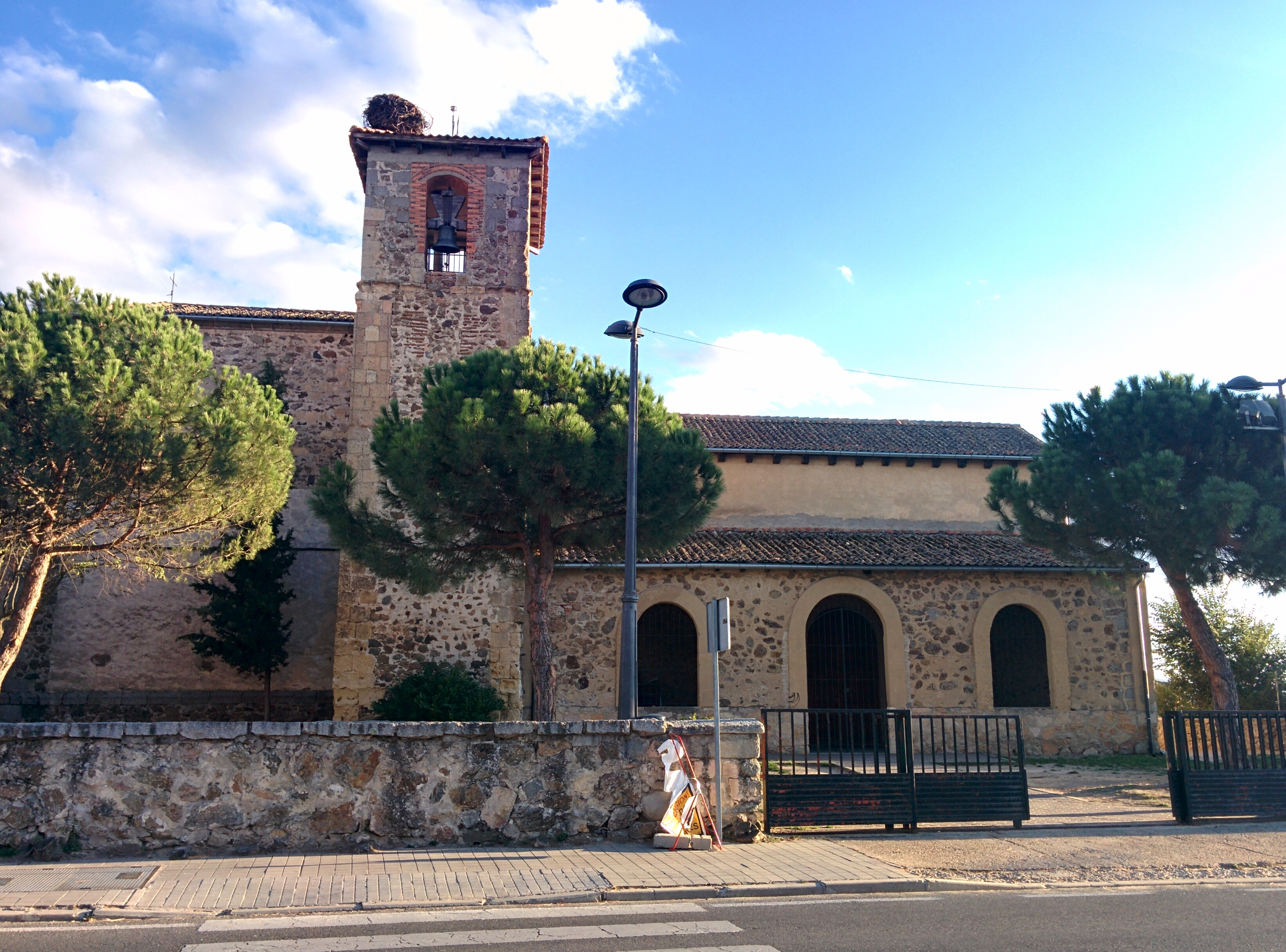
Church of the Assumption

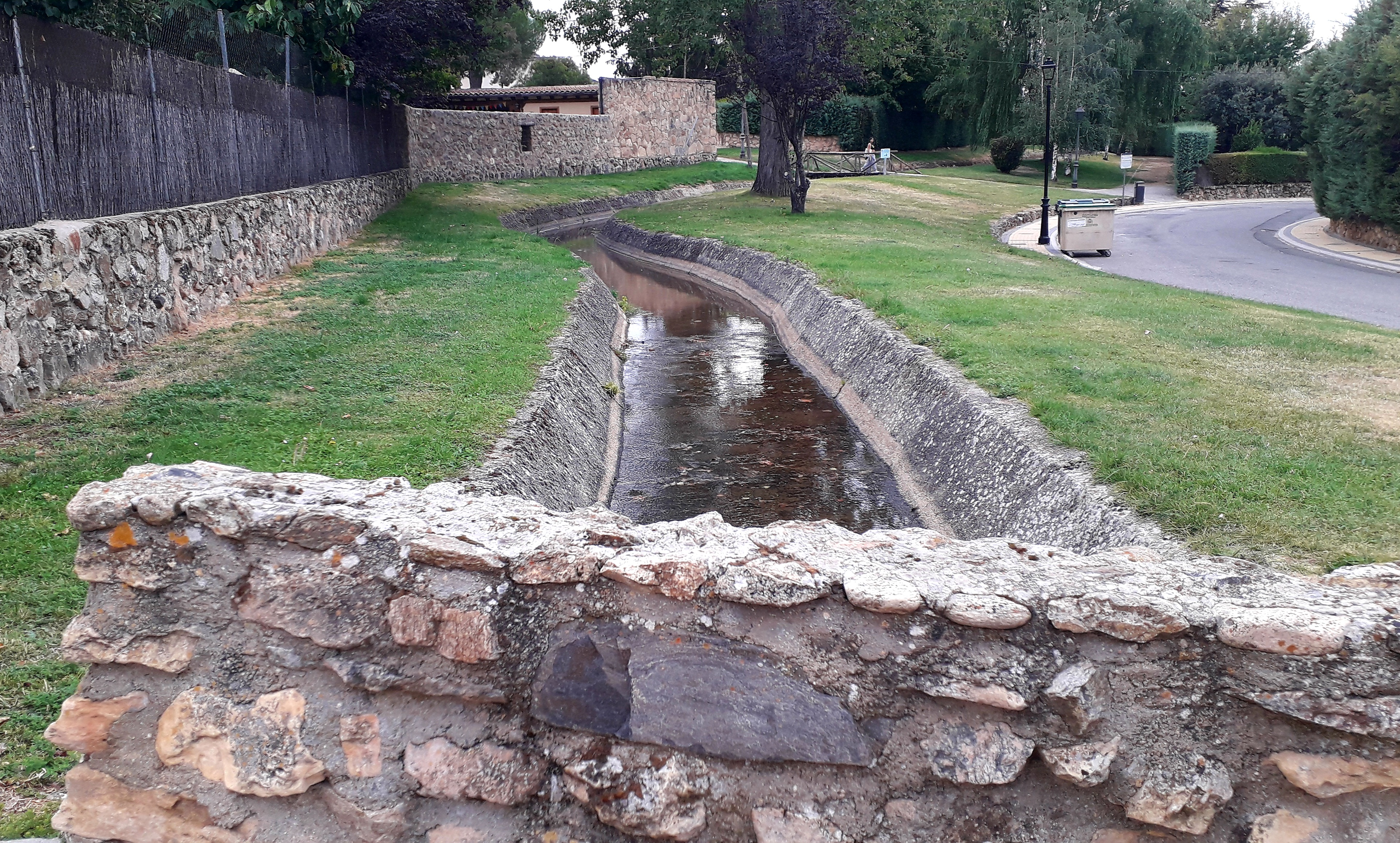
Cacera de Navalcaz as it passes through Parque Robledo

=== Heritage ===
- Parish Church of Nuestra Señora de la Asunción, in the late Gothic style, originally Romanesque, was restored in 2021. It has a Baroque main altarpiece, a silver processional cross and a Monstrance of the Sun created in Segovia in the 18th century;
- Parish Church of Our Lady of the Rosary;
- DYC whiskey factory, founded in 1959 by Nicomedes García;
- Boilers of the Cambrones river;
- Alto Eresma Green Path;
- Remains of a Roman villa and later Visigothic necropolis;
- The Barbers bunker with origins in the Civil War, located in a place known as the Balcón de Pilatos located next to the river Eresma;
- Hermitage of San Antonio de Padua;
- Remains of the old paper factory of the old Marqués del Arco mill;
- Estate and royal palace of the Quinta de Quitapesares;
- Remains of the buckle factory, the old Gamones mill;
- Remains of shearing ranches;
- Shoe rack, next to the Trescasas road;
- Caceras del Cambrones and Navalcaz;
- Bridge of the Merinas over the Eresma.

=== Holidays ===
==== Throughout the municipality ====
- Battering;
- Cacera Mayor Day, last Saturday of May.

==== Palazuelos de Eresma ====
- Anthony of Padua, June 13;
- Assumption of Mary, on August 15.
