= Cuadros =

Cuadros, Spain
- municipality
- Flag Coat of arms

- Location within Spain Location within Castile and León
- Coordinates: 42°42′37″N 5°38′20″W
- Country: Spain
- Autonomous community: Castile and León
- Province: León
- Municipality: Cuadros

Government
  - Mayor: Martín Marcos Martínez Barazón (PP)

Area
  - Total: 109.70 km^{2} (42.36 sq mi)
- Elevation: 904 m (2,966 ft)

Population (2025-01-01)
  - Total: 2,075
  - Density: 18.92/km^{2} (48.99/sq mi)
- Demonym: cuadrense
- Time zone: UTC+1 (CET)
  - Summer (DST): UTC+2 (CEST)
- Postal Code: 24620
- Telephone prefix: 987
- Website: Ayto. de Cuadros

Cuadros (Spanish pronunciation: [ˈkwaðɾos]) is a municipality located in the province of León, Castile and León, Spain. According to the 2010 census (INE), the municipality has a population of 1,980 inhabitants.
