= Cabañas de Polendos =

- Municipality
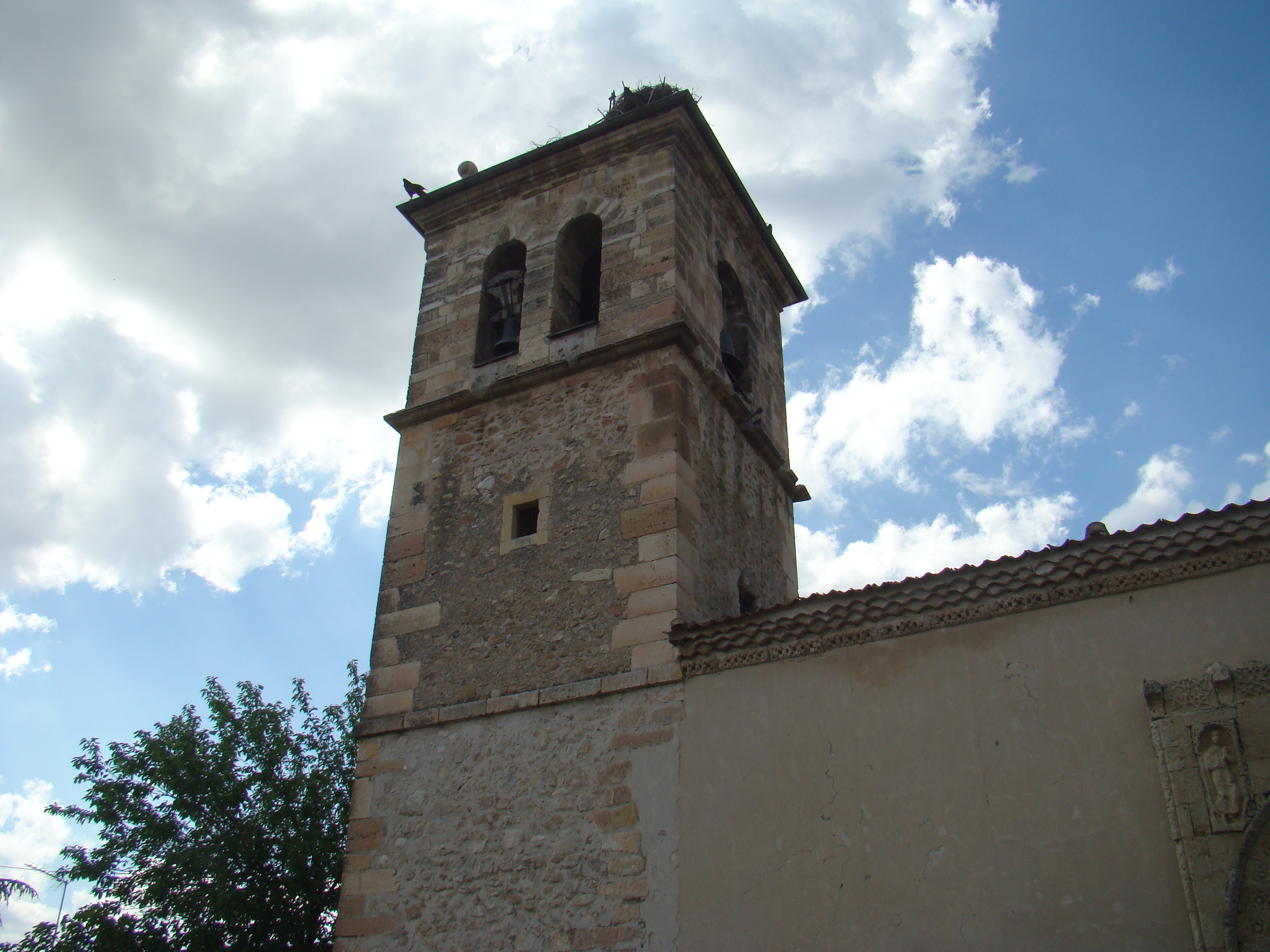

- Location in Spain. Cabañas de Polendos (Spain)
- Coordinates: 41°04′01″N 4°06′36″W
- Country: Spain
- Autonomous community: Castile and León
- Province: Segovia
- Municipality: Cabañas de Polendos

Area
  - Total: 26.41 km^{2} (10.20 sq mi)
- Elevation: 939 m (3,081 ft)

Population (2025-01-01)
  - Total: 202
  - Density: 7.65/km^{2} (19.8/sq mi)
- Time zone: UTC+1 (CET)
  - Summer (DST): UTC+2 (CEST)
- Website: Official website

Cabañas de Polendos is a municipality located in the province of Segovia, Castile and León, Spain. According to the 2004 census (INE), the municipality had a population of 121 inhabitants.
