= Adrada de Pirón =

- Municipality
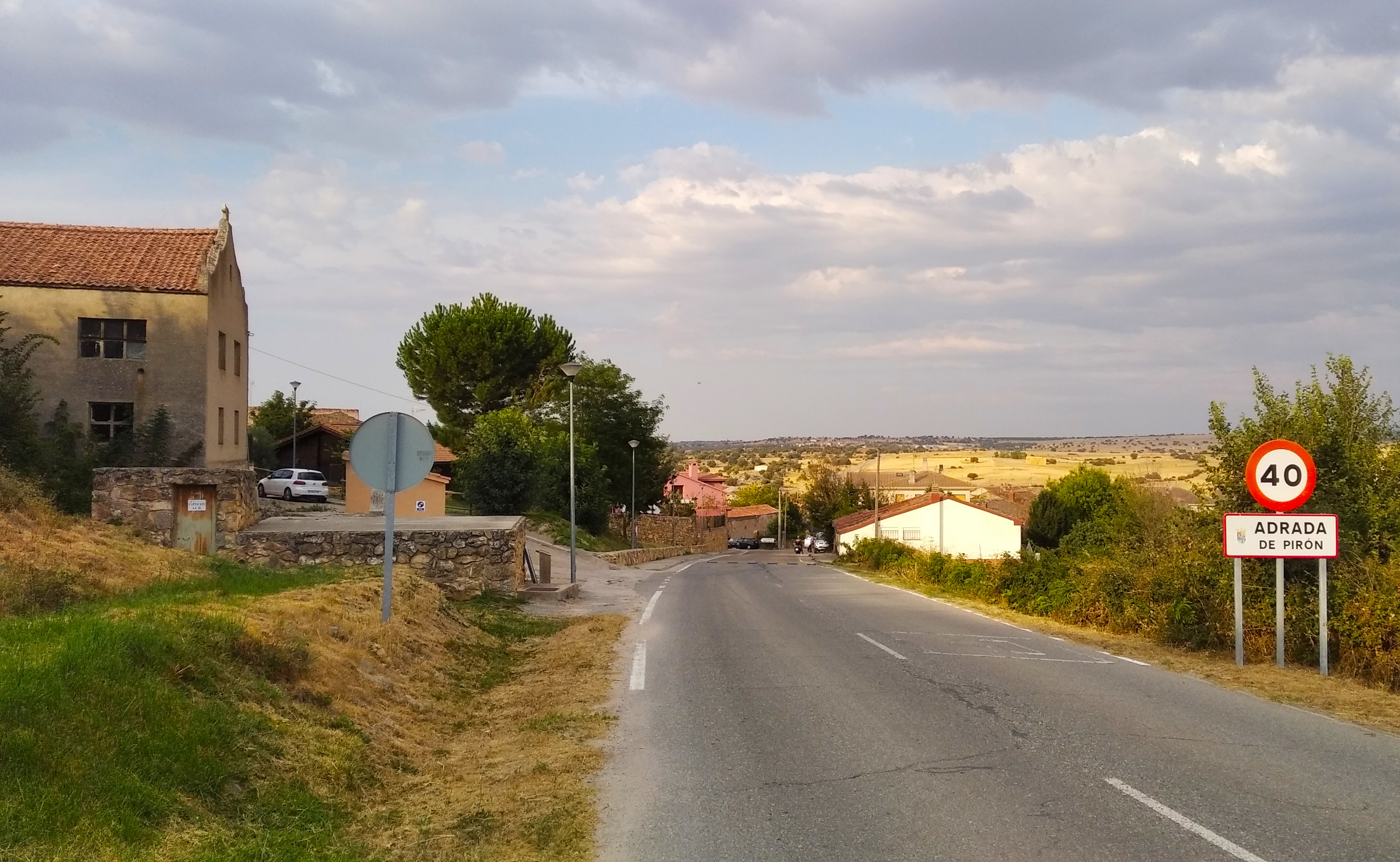

- Location in Spain. Adrada de Pirón (Spain)
- Coordinates: 41°03′07″N 4°03′03″W
- Country: Spain
- Autonomous community: Castile and León
- Province: Segovia
- Municipality: Adrada de Pirón

Area
  - Total: 10.72 km^{2} (4.14 sq mi)
- Elevation: 1,019 m (3,343 ft)

Population (2025-01-01)
  - Total: 39
  - Density: 3.6/km^{2} (9.4/sq mi)
- Time zone: UTC+1 (CET)
  - Summer (DST): UTC+2 (CEST)
- Website: Official website

Adrada de Pirón is a municipality located in the province of Segovia, Castile and León, Spain. According to the 2004 census (INE), the municipality had a population of 47 inhabitants.

== Legends ==
- Legend of the Tuerto de Pirón. El Tuerto de Pirón was a bandit born in the neighboring town of Santo Domingo de Pirón. Fernando Delgado Sanz, nicknamed El Tuerto de Pirón, was known to rob the rich and raid churches and roads. Adrada de Pirón was one of the places where he performed the most.
