= La Lastrilla =

- Municipality
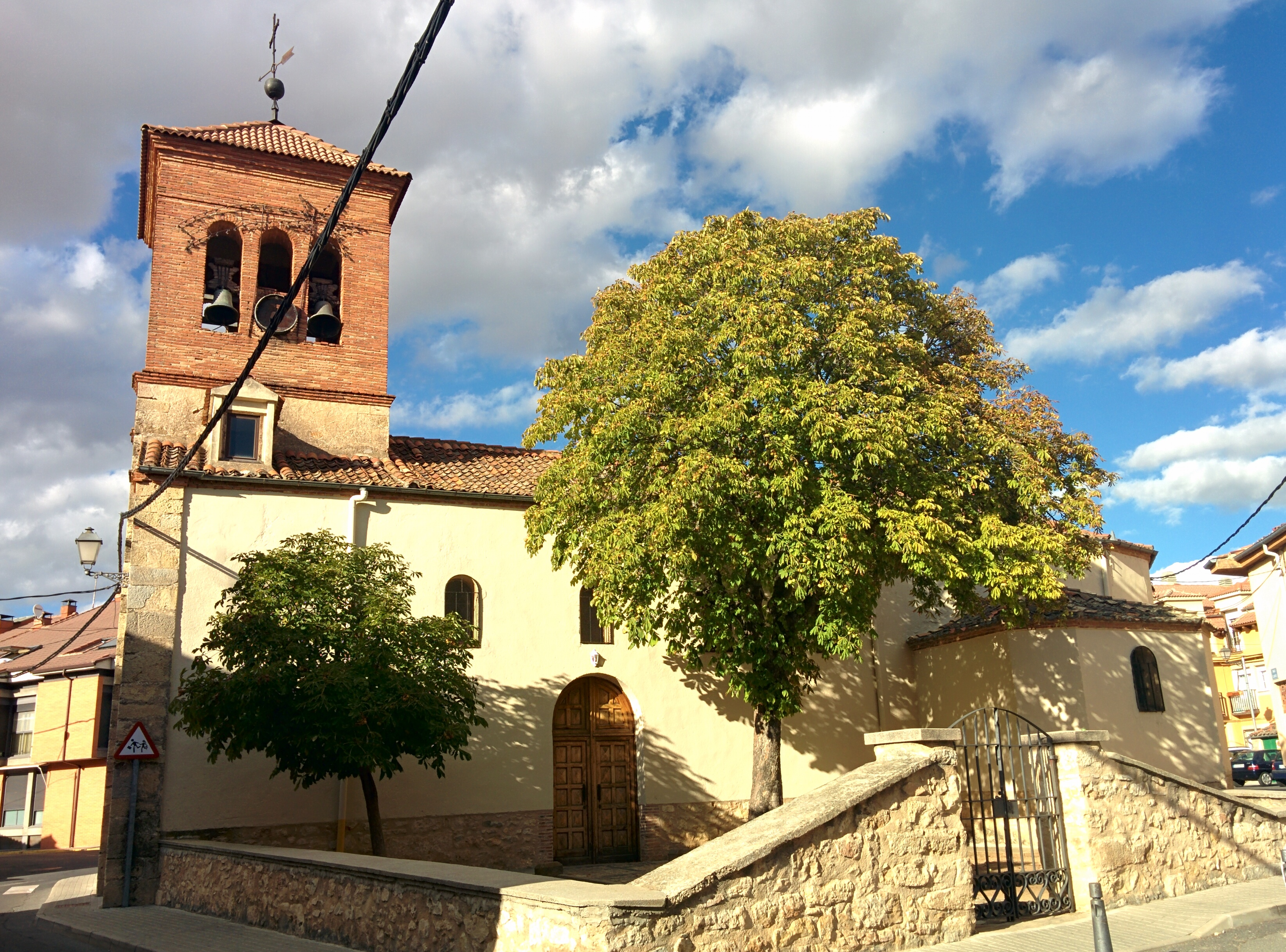
- Church of San Juan Bautista

- Flag Coat of arms

- Location in Spain. La Lastrilla (Spain)
- Coordinates: 40°58′08″N 4°06′12″W
- Country: Spain
- Autonomous community: Castile and León
- Province: Segovia
- Municipality: La Lastrilla

Area
  - Total: 9 km^{2} (3.5 sq mi)

Population (2025-01-01)
  - Total: 4,781
  - Density: 530/km^{2} (1,400/sq mi)
- Time zone: UTC+1 (CET)
  - Summer (DST): UTC+2 (CEST)
- Website: Official website

La Lastrilla is a municipality located in the province of Segovia, Castile and León, Spain. According to the 2019 census (INE), the municipality has a population of 3,891 inhabitants.
