= Torrecaballeros =

- Municipality
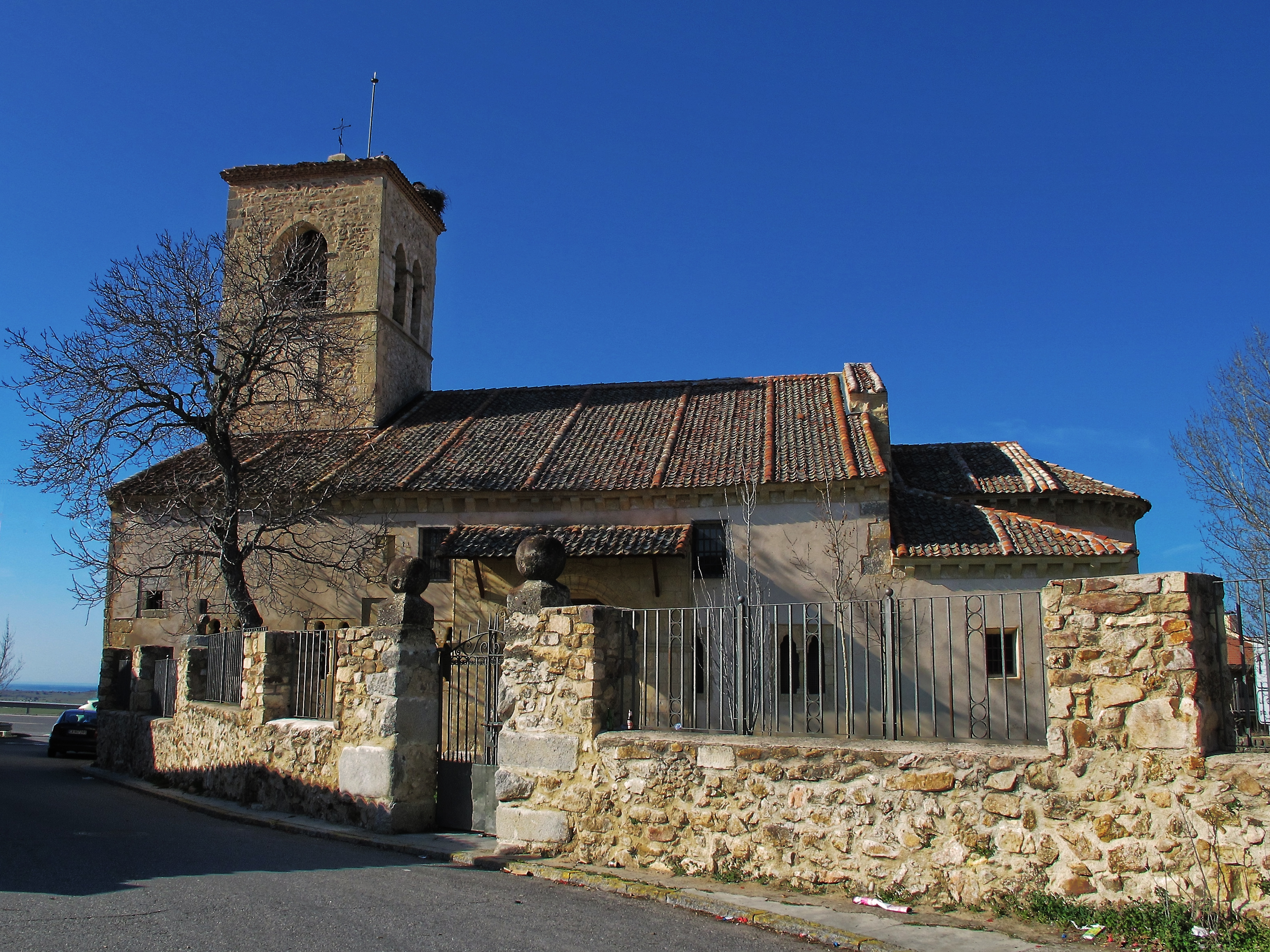
- Church of San Nicolás de Bari in the town of Torrecaballeros, province of Segovia, Castilla y León, Spain.

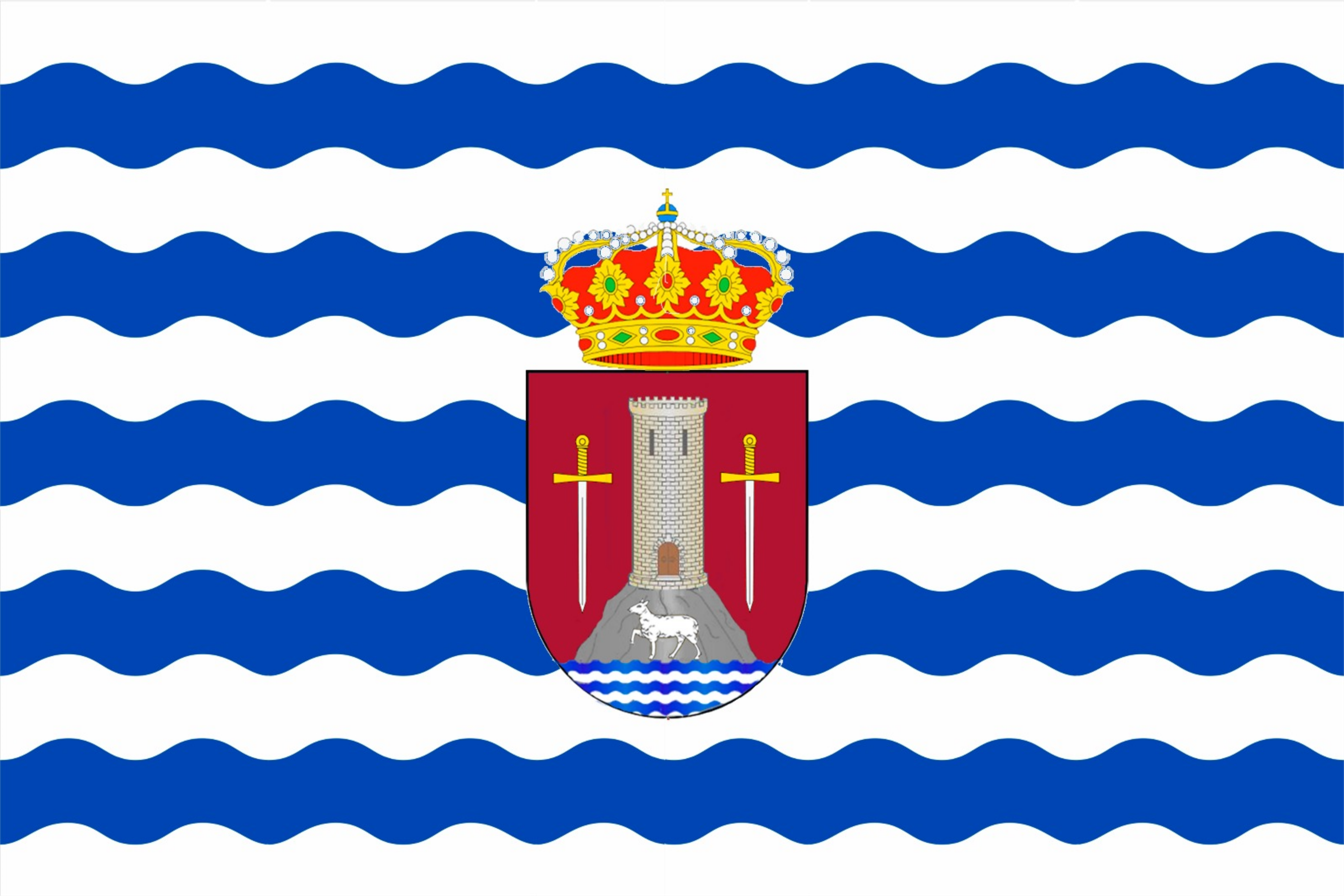
- Flag Coat of arms

- Location in Spain. Torrecaballeros (Spain)
- Coordinates: 40°59′31″N 4°01′26″W
- Country: Spain
- Autonomous community: Castile and León
- Province: Segovia
- Municipality: Torrecaballeros

Area
  - Total: 42.14 km^{2} (16.27 sq mi)
- Elevation: 1,152 m (3,780 ft)

Population (2025-01-01)
  - Total: 1,505
  - Density: 35.71/km^{2} (92.50/sq mi)
- Time zone: UTC+1 (CET)
  - Summer (DST): UTC+2 (CEST)
- Website: Official website

Torrecaballeros is a municipality located in the province of Segovia, Castile and León, Spain. Its current population is slightly over 1372 inhabitants as it has experienced a remarkable growth in terms of population during the last decade.

Torrecaballeros also has the location of Cabanillas del Monte, La Aldehuela and La Torre.

== History ==
Torrecaballeros and its annexes such as La Torre, La La Aldehuela, Cabanillas: in the Middle Ages it was called Oter de Cavalleros, that is, Otero de Caballeros. In the 16th century it was mentioned as Tor de Caballeros. But since 1759 it already had the current name. Located next to the Sierra de Guadarrama, it was an obligatory passage of transhumance through the Cañada Real Soriana Occidental. It was a town of ranchers and mountain people, from woodcutters to shepherds. It belonged to the Sexmo de San Lorenzo.
