= Espirdo =

- Municipality
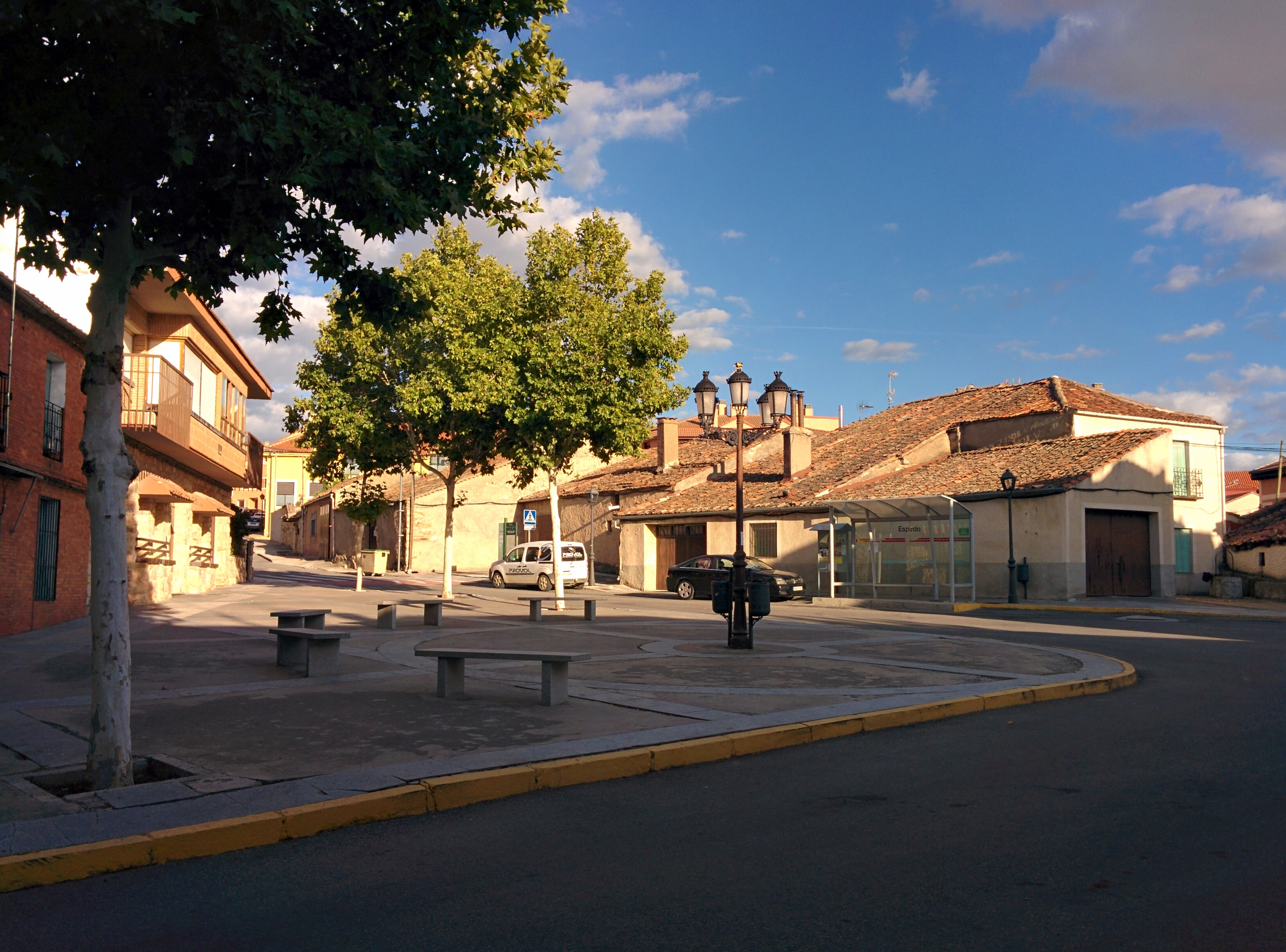
- Street of Espirdo

- Flag Coat of arms

- Location in Spain. Espirdo (Spain)
- Coordinates: 40°59′51″N 4°04′24″W
- Country: Spain
- Autonomous community: Castile and León
- Province: Segovia
- Municipality: Espirdo

Area
  - Total: 26.01 km^{2} (10.04 sq mi)
- Elevation: 1,062 m (3,484 ft)

Population (2025-01-01)
  - Total: 1,613
  - Density: 62.01/km^{2} (160.6/sq mi)
- Time zone: UTC+1 (CET)
  - Summer (DST): UTC+2 (CEST)
- Website: Official website

Espirdo is a municipality located in the province of Segovia, Castile and León, Spain. According to the 2004 census (INE), the municipality had a population of 372 inhabitants.
