= Divisiones Regionales de Fútbol in Castile and León =

The Divisiones Regionales de Fútbol in the Community of Castile and León:

- Primera División Regional Aficionados (Level 6)
- Primera División Provincial Aficionados (Level 7)
- Segunda División Provincial Aficionados (Level 8)
- Tercera División Provincial Aficionados (Level 9)

== League chronology ==
Timeline - Ávila

- The regional categories of Ávila were included in Madrid until 1986

Timeline - Burgos

Timeline - León

Timeline - Palencia

Timeline - Salamanca

Timeline - Segovia

- The regional categories of Segovia were included in Madrid until 1986

Timeline - Soria

- The regional categories of Soria were included in Aragon until 1985

Timeline - Valladolid

Timeline - Zamora

== Primera Regional ==
Primera Regional
- Founded: Unknown
- Country: Spain
- Number of clubs: two groups of 16 teams each one
- Level on pyramid: 6
- Promotion to: 3ª RFEF – Group 8
- Relegation to: Primera Provincial
- Domestic cup: None
- Website: Official website

Primera Regional is the sixth level of competition of the Spanish Football League in the Community of Castile and León.

=== The league ===
The Primera División Regional is played in two groups of 16 teams. At the end of the season, the champion of each group are promoted. Two next best ranked teams from each group qualificate for the promotion play-offs, where they compete for one promotion spot. Bottom four teams from Group A and bottom three from Group B are relegated to Primera División Provincial Aficionado. Further teams may be relegated to maintain a league of 32 teams.

=== 2026–27 teams ===
==== Group A ====
2026–27 Primera Regional – Group A teams
Teams in Burgos: Burgos International Football, Internacional Vista Alegre.
Teams in Soria: Numancia B, San José.

Club	City	Founded	2025–26 season
Becerril	Becerril de Campos	1977	17th (3ª Federación (Group VIII))
Numancia B	Soria	1979	18th (3ª Federación (Group VIII))
San José	Soria	1978	2nd
Briviesca	Briviesca	1970	4th
Internacional Vista Alegre	Burgos	2009	5th
Burgos Internacional Football	Burgos	2022	6th
Cebrereña	Cebreros	1949	7th
Villamuriel	Villamuriel de Cerrato	1977	8th
Villarcayo Nela	Villarcayo de Merindad de Castilla la Vieja	1972	9th
Coca	Coca	—	10th
Belorado	Belorado	—	11th
Golmayo-Camaretas	Golmayo	—	12th
Real Ávila Promesas	Ávila	—	1st (1ª División Provincial (Ávila))
Aranda Riber	Aranda de Duero	—	1st (1ª División Provincial (Burgos))
Astudillo	Astudillo	—	1st (1ª División Provincial (Palencia))
Cantalejo	Cantalejo	—	1st (1ª Provincial (Segovia))

==== Group B ====
2026–27 Primera Regional – Group B teams
Teams in Valladolid: Betis, Victoria.
Teams in Zamora: Noname, Zamora B.

Club	City	Founded	2025–26 season
Mojados	Mojados	1950	16th (3ª Federación (Group VIII))
Betis	Valladolid	1942	2nd
La Bañeza	La Bañeza	1956	3rd
Sariegos del Bernesga	Sariegos	—	4th
Ciudad Rodrigo	Ciudad Rodrigo	1953	5th
Cubillos	Cubillos del Sil	—	6th
La Cistérniga	Cistérniga	—	7th
Victoria	Valladolid	—	8th
Ponferradina B	Ponferrada	1963	9th
Béjar Industrial	Béjar	1951	10th
Zamora B	Zamora	2021	11th
Noname	Zamora	2023	12th
Veguellina	Veguellina de Órbigo	—	2nd (1ª División Provincial (León))
Ribert	Salamanca	2017	1st (1ª División Provincial (Salamanca))
Villa de Simancas	Simancas	1997	1st (1ª División Provincial (Valladolid))
Villaralbo B	Villaralbo	—	1st (1ª División Provincial (Zamora))

== Primera Provincial ==
Primera Provincial
- Founded: Unknown
- Country: Spain
- Number of clubs: 143 (9 groups)
- Level on pyramid: 7
- Promotion to: Primera Regional
- Relegation to: Segunda Provincial
- Domestic cup: None
- Website: Official website

Primera Provincial is the seventh level of competition of the Spanish Football League in the Community of Castilla y León.

=== The League ===
The Primera División Provincial comprises nine groups (one from each province) from 14 to 18 teams. The nine provincial champions are promoted to Primera División Regional. There are relegations to Segunda Provincial de Aficionados in four provinces; Ávila, Segovia (3 clubs), León (2 clubs) and Valladolid (3 clubs).

=== 2026–27 teams ===
==== Group Ávila ====
2026–27 Primera Provincial – Group Ávila teams
Teams in Ávila: Rayo Abulense.

Club	City	Founded	2025–26 season
Bosco de Arévalo	Arévalo	—	2nd
Deportivo Arenas	Arenas de San Pedro	—	3rd
Rayo Abulense	Ávila	2020	4th
Atlético Candeleda	Candeleda	1977	5th
Las Navas	Las Navas del Marqués	2019	6th
El Hoyo de Pinares	El Hoyo de Pinares	—	7th
Cebrereña B	Cebreros	—	8th
Sotillo	Sotillo de la Adrada	—	9th
Serranillos	Serranillos	—	10th
Atlético El Barraco	El Barraco	—	11th
Navatalgordo	Navatalgordo	—	12th
Casillas	Casillas	—	13th
Ramacastañas	Ramacastañas	—	14th
Casavieja	Casavieja	—	1st (2ª División Provincial (Ávila))
El Tiemblo	El Tiemblo	—	2nd (2ª División Provincial (Ávila))

==== Group Burgos ====
2026–27 Primera Provincial – Group Burgos teams
Teams in Aranda de Duero: Aranda Riber B, Arandina B.
Teams in Burgos: Burgos Internacional Football B, Capiscol, Groggy's Gamonal, Juventud del Círculo Católico, San Cristóbal Castilla, San Felices, San Pedro, Vadillos.

Club	City	Founded	2025–26 season
Capiscol	Burgos	—	15th (1ª División Regional(Group A))
Groggy's Gamonal	Burgos	—	2nd
Polideportivo Salas	Salas de los Infantes	1955	3rd
Alcázar	Medina de Pomar	—	4th
Juventud del Círculo Católico	Burgos	1928	5th
San Pedro	Burgos	—	6th
Trespaderne	Trespaderne	—	7th
Raudense	Roa de Duero	—	8th
Vadillos	Burgos	—	9th
Burgos Internacional Football B	Burgos	—	10th
Casco Viejo	Miranda de Ebro	—	11th
Montija	Merindad de Montija	—	12th
San Cristóbal Castilla	Burgos	—	13th
Aranda Riber B	Aranda de Duero	—	
Arandina B	Aranda de Duero	—	
Racing Lermeño	Lerma	1984	
San Felices	Burgos	—	
Tardajos	Tardajos	—	

==== Group León ====
2026–27 Primera Provincial – Group León teams
Teams in León: Atlético Pinilla, Atlético Puente Castro, Cultural Leonesa C, Ejido.

Club	City	Founded	2025–26 season
Naraya de Halterofilia	Camponaraya	—	1st
La Virgen del Camino B	La Virgen del Camino	—	3rd
Arenas de Vega de Espinareda	Vega de Espinareda	—	4th
Atlético Puente Castro	León	—	5th
Coyanza	Valencia de Don Juan	—	6th
Atlético Trobajo H	Trobajo del Camino	—	7th
Ejido	León	1975	8th
Atlético Pinilla	León	—	9th
Toreno	Toreno	—	10th
Laciana	Villablino	—	11th
Toralense	Toral de los Vados	1932	12th
Santa Ana	Astorga	—	13th
Cultural Leonesa C	León	—	14th
Onzonilla	Onzonilla	1992	15th
Fabero	Fabero	1953	1st (2ª División Provincial (León))
Eria	Castrocalbón	—	2nd (2ª División Provincial (León))

==== Group Palencia ====
2026–27 Primera Provincial – Group Palencia teams
Teams in Palencia: Jóvenes Promesas, Pan y Guindas, Unión Popular Palencia.

Club	City	Founded	2025–26 season
Venta de Baños	Venta de Baños	1943	13th (1ª División Regional(Group A))
Unión Popular Palencia	Palencia	2019	2nd
Villada	Villada	—	3rd
Carrión	Carrión de los Condes	—	4th
Villalobón	Villalobón	—	5th
Velilla	Velilla del Río Carrión	—	6th
Monzón	Monzón de Campos	—	7th
Saldaña	Saldaña	—	8th
Baltanás	Baltanás	—	9th
Castilla Dueñas	Dueñas	—	10th
Unión Popular Barruelo	Barruelo de Santullán	—	11th
Jóvenes Promesas	Palencia	—	12th
Atlético Aguilar	Aguilar de Campoo	—	13th
Carejas Paredes	Paredes de Nava	2011	14th
Grijota	Grijota	—	16th
Guardo	Guardo	—	18th
Cervera	Cervera de Pisuerga	—	
Pan y Guindas	Palencia	—	

==== Group Salamanca ====
2026–27 Primera Provincial – Group Salamanca teams
Teams in Carbajosa de la Sagrada: CD Carbajosa de la Sagrada, Sporting Carbajosa.
Teams in Salamanca: Cristo Rey Barrio Vidal, Deportivo Salamanca, Hergar Helmántica, Jai-Alai Bolívar, Latino Kukuli, Muníbar Pizarrales, Navega, Real Salamanca Monterrey, Select Generation Academy.

Club	City	Founded	2025–26 season
Helmántico	Salamanca	—	16th (1ª División Regional(Group B))
Santa Marta B	Santa Marta de Tormes	—	2nd
Real Salamanca Monterrey	Salamanca	—	3rd
Peñaranda	Peñaranda de Bracamonte	—	4th
Jai-Alai Bolívar	Salamanca	—	5th
Villares de la Reina	Villares de la Reina	—	6th
Villamayor	Villamayor	—	7th
Muníbar Pizarrales	Salamanca	—	8th
Deportivo Salamanca	Salamanca	—	9th
Navega	Salamanca	—	10th
Hergar Helmántica	Salamanca	—	11th
Carbajosa de la Sagrada	Carbajosa de la Sagrada	—	12th
Sporting Carbajosa	Carbajosa de la Sagrada	—	13th
Cristo Rey Barrio Vidal	Salamanca	—	14th
Select Generation Academy	Salamanca	—	1st (2ª División Provincial (Salamanca))
Latino Kukuli	Salamanca	—	2nd (2ª División Provincial (Salamanca))

==== Group Segovia ====
2026–27 Primera Provincial – Group Segovia teams
Teams in Segovia: Claret, Gimnástica Segoviana B, Unami.

Club	City	Founded	2025–26 season
El Espinar-San Rafael	El Espinar	2000	16th (1ª División Regional(Group A))
Real Sitio	Real Sitio de San Ildefonso	—	2nd
Monteresma-La Atalaya	Palazuelos de Eresma	2013	3rd
Cantimpalos	Cantimpalos	—	4th
Unami	Segovia	1979	5th
Turégano B	Turégano	—	6th
Cuéllar Balompié	Cuéllar	2003	7th
Claret	Segovia	—	8th
Gimnástica Ayllonesa	Ayllón	—	9th
Carbonero El Mayor	Carbonero el Mayor	—	10th
Villacastín Racing	Villacastín	—	11th
Sierra de la Mujer Muerta	La Losa	—	12th
Cabezuela	Cabezuela	—	14th
Vallelado	Vallelado	—	15th
Gimnástica Segoviana B	Segovia	—	2nd (2ª División Provincial (Segovia))
Sepúlveda	Sepúlveda	—	3rd (2ª División Provincial (Segovia))

==== Group Soria ====
2026–27 Primera Provincial – Group Soria teams
Teams in Soria: Calasanz B, San José B.

Club	City	Founded	2025–26 season
Uxama	El Burgo de Osma	1924	14th (1ª División Regional(Group A))
Valeránica	Berlanga de Duero	—	1st
Calasanz B	Soria	—	2nd
San José B	Soria	—	3rd
Quintana	Quintana Redonda	—	4th
Tardelcuende	Tardelcuende	—	5th
Piqueras	Almarza	—	6th
Covaleda	Covaleda	—	7th
Langa	Langa de Duero	—	8th
Visontium	Vinuesa	—	9th
San Esteban	San Esteban de Gormaz	—	10th
Navaleno	Navaleno	—	11th
Norma San Leonardo	San Leonardo de Yagüe	—	12th
Castroviejo	Duruelo de la Sierra	—	13th

==== Group Valladolid ====
Club	City	Founded	2025–26 season
Laguna	Laguna de Duero	1963	13th (1ª División Regional(Group B))
Boecillo	Boecillo	—	2nd
Juventud Rondilla	Valladolid	—	3rd
Gimnástica Medinense	Medina del Campo	1960	4th
Arces	Valladolid	—	5th
Racing Valdestillas	Valdestillas	—	6th
Sur	Valladolid	—	7th
Atlético Tordesillas B	Tordesillas	—	8th
La Pedraja	La Pedraja de Portillo	1980	9th
Betis B	Valladolid	—	10th
San Miguel Olmedo	Olmedo	—	11th
Parquesol	Valladolid	—	12th
Atlético Peñafiel	Peñafiel	—	13th
Atlético de Laguna	Laguna de Duero	—	1st (2ª División Provincial (Valladolid))
Rioseco	Medina de Rioseco	—	2nd (2ª División Provincial (Valladolid))
Zaratán Sport	Zaratán	—	3rd (2ª División Provincial (Valladolid))

==== Group Zamora ====
2026–27 Primera Provincial – Group Zamora teams
Teams in Benavente: Benavente, Racing Benavente.
Teams in Puebla de Sanabria: Atlético Sanabria, Sanabria CF.
Teams in Zamora: Atlético Zamora, Ciudad de Zamora, Sporting Zamora, Sporting Zamora B.

Club	City	Founded	2025–26 season
Benavente	Benavente	1948	14th (1ª División Regional(Group B))
Bovedana	La Bóveda de Toro	1980	2nd
Fresno de La Ribera	Fresno de la Ribera	—	3rd
Santa Croya	Santa Croya de Tera	—	4th
Atlético de Sanabria	Puebla de Sanabria	—	5th
Racing Benavente	Benavente	—	6th
Coreses	Coreses	—	7th
Ciudad de Zamora	Zamora	—	8th
Benavente B	Benavente	—	9th
San Cristóbal	San Cristóbal de Entreviñas	—	10th
Sporting Zamora B	Zamora	—	11th
Toresana	Toro	—	12th
Sporting Zamora	Zamora	—	13th
Atlético Zamora	Zamora	1943	14th
Sanabria CF	Puebla de Sanabria	—	15th

== Segunda Provincial ==
Segunda Provincial
- Founded: Unknown
- Country: Spain
- Number of clubs: 61 (5 groups)
- Level on pyramid: 8
- Promotion to: Primera Provincial
- Relegation to: Tercera Provincial
- Domestic cup: None
- Website: Official website

=== The League ===
The Segunda Provincial is played in five provinces (Ávila, León, Salamanca, Segovia, Valladolid and Zamora) in five groups from 8 to 16 teams. The group winners from Ávila and Salamanca, the two top clubs from León and the three top clubs from Segovia and Valladolid are promoted to Primera División Provincial Aficionado.

=== 2026–27 teams ===
==== Group Ávila ====
2026–27 Segunda Provincial – Group Ávila teams

Club	City	Founded	2025–26 season
Piedralaves	Piedralaves	—	3rd
Arévalo C.F.	Arévalo	—	4th
Burgohondo	Burgohondo	—	5th
Pedro Bernardo	Pedro Bernardo	—	8th
Atlético Candeleda B	Candeleda	—	
La Adrada	La Adrada	—	

==== Group León ====
2026–27 Segunda Provincial – Group León teams

Club	City	Founded	2025–26 season
San Andrés	San Andrés del Rabanedo	—	16th (1ª División Provincial (León))
Unión Valdornesa	Posada de la Valduerna	—	3rd
Unión Cacabelense	Cacabelos	—	4th
Santovenia de la Valdoncina	Santovenia de la Valdoncina	—	5th
Cuatrovientos	Ponferrada	—	7th
Atlético Paramés	Santa María del Páramo	—	8th
Berciano Villadepalos	Villadepalos	—	9th
Ribera Carrizo	Carrizo de la Ribera	—	10th
Casa de Asturias en León	Navatejera	—	12th
Benavides	Benavides	—	13th
Santa Ana Cabañas Raras	Ponferrada	—	
Sport del Bernesga	Carbajal de la Legua	—	

==== Group Salamanca ====
2026–27 Segunda Provincial – Group Salamanca teams
Teams in Salamanca: Cristo Rey Barrio Vidal B, Deportivo Salamanca B, Helmántico B, Jai-Alai Bolívar B, Latino Kukuli B, Muníbar Pizarrales B, Real Salamanca Monterrey B.

Club	City	Founded	2025–26 season
Cabrerizos	Cabrerizos	—	3rd
Alba de Tormes	Alba de Tormes	—	4th
Helmántico B	Salamanca	—	5th
Deportivo Salamanca B	Salamanca	—	7th
Mirobrigense	Ciudad Rodrigo	—	8th
Muníbar Pizarrales B	Salamanca	—	9th
Real Salamanca Monterrey B	Salamanca	—	10th
Jai-Alai Bolívar B	Salamanca	—	11th
Carbajosa de la Sagrada B	Carbajosa de la Sagrada	—	
Cristo Rey Barrio Vidal B	Salamanca	—	
Guijuelo B	Guijuelo	—	
Latino Kukuli B	Salamanca	—	

==== Group Segovia ====
2026–27 Segunda Provincial – Group Segovia teams
Teams in Segovia: Quintanar Palacio, Unami B.

Club	City	Founded	2025–26 season
Pinillos	Pinillos de Polendos	—	16th (1ª División Provincial (Segovia))
Monteresma-La Atalaya B	Palazuelos de Eresma	—	1st
Recreativo San Rafael	El Espinar	—	4th
Quintanar Palacio	Segovia	—	5th
Real Sitio B	Real Sitio de San Ildefonso	—	6th
Coca B	Coca	—	7th
Carbonero El Mayor B	Carbonero el Mayor	—	8th
Atlético Hontanares	Hontanares de Eresma	—	9th
Cantalejo B	Cantalejo	—	10th
Valseca	Valseca	2000	11th
Mozoncillo	Mozoncillo	—	12th
Prádena	Prádena	—	13th
Bernardos	Bernardos	—	14th
Unami B	Segovia	—	15th
Navas de Oro Luzco	Navas de Oro	—	16th

==== Group Valladolid ====
Club	City	Founded	2025–26 season
Unión Arroyo	Arroyo de la Encomienda	—	14th (1ª División Provincial (Valladolid))
Derecho UVa	Valladolid	—	15th (1ª División Provincial (Valladolid))
Navarrés	Nava del Rey	1995	16th (1ª División Provincial (Valladolid))
Renedo de Esgueva	Renedo de Esgueva	—	4th
Rueda	Rueda	—	5th
Victoria B	Valladolid	—	6th
Íscar	Íscar	1968	7th
Villanubla	Villanubla	—	8th
Cigales	Cigales	—	9th
La Seca	La Seca	—	10th
San Agustín Valladolid	Valladolid	—	11th
Atlético Portillo	Portillo	—	12th
Don Bosco	Valladolid	—	13th
Tudela	Tudela de Duero	—	1st (3ª División Provincial (Valladolid (Group 1)))
Mojados B	Mojados	—	1st (3ª División Provincial (Valladolid (Group 2)))
Juventud Rondilla B	Valladolid	—	2nd (3ª División Provincial (Valladolid (Group 1)))

== Tercera Provincial ==
Tercera Provincial
- Founded: Unknown
- Country: Spain
- Number of clubs: 32 (2 groups)
- Level on pyramid: 9
- Promotion to: Segunda Provincial
- Domestic cup: None
- Website: Official website

=== The League ===
The Tercera Provincial is played in the province of Valladolid in two subgroups of 14 and 11 teams. The two top clubs from the top subgroup (A) are promoted to Segunda División Provincial Aficionado, while the third team from subgroup A and the top club from subgroup B will compete in a play-off for promotion.

=== 2026–27 teams ===
==== Group Valladolid 1 ====
Club	City	Founded	2025–26 season
La Cistérniga B	Cistérniga	—	3rd
San José Jesuítas	Valladolid	—	5th
Cabezón	Cabezón de Pisuerga	—	5th (Grupo 2)
Santovenia	Santovenia de Pisuerga	—	6th
Racing de Mayorga	Mayorga	—	7th
Aleste	Valladolid	—	8th
Unión Delicias	Valladolid	—	9th
San Pío X	Valladolid	—	11th
Sur B	Valladolid	—	12th
Renedo de Esgueva B	Renedo de Esgueva	—	13th (Grupo 2)
Belén	Valladolid	—	16th
Arces B	Valladolid	—	
Ave María Vedruna	Valladolid	—	
Parquesol B	Valladolid	—	
Torrelobaton Balompié	Torrelobatón	—	
Real Valladolid C	Valladolid	—	

==== Group Valladolid 2 ====
Club	City	Founded	2025–26 season
Viana de Cega	Viana de Cega	—	14th (2ª División Provincial (Valladolid))
Villa de Simancas B	Simancas	—	15th (2ª División Provincial (Valladolid))
Laguna B	Laguna de Duero	—	16th (2ª División Provincial (Valladolid))
Herrera de Duero	Herrera de Duero	—	2nd
Zaratán Sport B	Zaratán	—	3rd
Gimnástica Medinense B	Medina del Campo	—	4th
Boecillana	Boecillo	—	4th (Group 1)
La Cistérniga C	Cistérniga	—	6th
Pedrajas	Pedrajas de San Esteban	—	7th
Atlético de Laguna B	Laguna de Duero	—	8th
Pozaldez	Pozaldez	—	9th
Atlético Serrada	Serrada	—	10th
Boecillo B	Boecillo	—	10th (Group 1)
Racing Valdestillas B	Valdestillas	—	13th (Group 1)
Atlético Tordesillas C	Tordesillas	—	
Tudela B	Tudela de Duero	—	
