= Tierras de León =

Coordinates: 42°33′50″N 5°35′23″W

Location in León Province

Tierra de León or Tierras de León (Tierras de Llión in the Leonese language) is a shire (comarca) in the province of León. The city of León, capital of the province, is the biggest city in the comarca.

== Municipal terms ==
Town	Pop. (1991)
Ardón	747
Chozas de Abajo	2.258
Cuadros	1.715
Garrafe de Torío	971
León	147.625
Onzonilla	1.394
San Andrés del Rabanedo	21.643
Santovenia de la Valdoncina	1.354
Sariegos	1.683
Valdefresno	1.547
Valdevimbre	1.275
Valverde de la Virgen	3.776
Vega de Infanzones	863
Villaquilambre	5.221
Villaturiel	1.714
Total	193.786

== See also ==
- León Airport
- Kingdom of León
