= Diego Antón =

Spanish footballer

Personal information
- Full name: Diego Antón Pérez
- Date of birth: 18 May 1990 (age 36)
- Place of birth: Soria, Spain
- Height: 1.76 m (5 ft 9 in)
- Position: Forward

Team information
- Current team: San José

Senior career*
| Years | Team | Apps | (Gls) |
| 2008–2013 | Numancia B | 117 | (29) |
| 2010 | Numancia | 7 | (1) |
| 2011 | → Peña Sport (loan) | 8 | (0) |
| 2011–2012 | → Arandina (loan) | 17 | (1) |
| 2013–2014 | Alcalá | 31 | (7) |
| 2015–2020 | Almazán | 56 | (16) |
| 2020-Actualidad | San José | | |
- * Club domestic league appearances and goals as of 7 Jan 2020

Diego Antón Pérez (born 18 May 1990) is a Spanish footballer who plays for CD San José as a forward.

== Club career ==
Antón was born in Soria. He finished his graduation in CD Numancia's youth setup, and made his senior debuts with the reserves in the 2007–08 campaign, in Tercera División.

On 16 May 2010 Antón played his first match as a professional, coming on as a second-half substitute in a 1–1 home draw against Rayo Vallecano in the Segunda División championship. Late in the month he scored his first professional goal, netting the first of a 2–1 home win against CD Castellón.

On 31 January 2011 Antón was loaned to Peña Sport FC, in Segunda División B. In August, he moved to Arandina CF in the same division, also in a temporary deal. Antón returned to the Castilian-Leonese side in the 2012 summer, and was again assigned to the B-team.

On 17 July 2013 he signed with RSD Alcalá, also in the fourth division.
