= Unami CP =

Unami
- Full name: Unami Club Polideportivo
- Founded: 1983
- Stadium: La Albuera, Segovia, Castile and León, Spain
- Capacity: 6,500
- President: Francisco Andray Fernández
- Coach: Gonzalo del Valle
- League: Primera Provincial – Segovia
- 2025–26: Primera Provincial – Segovia, 5th of 16
- Website: http://www.unamicp.com/
| Home colours | Away colours |

Unami Club Polideportivo is a Spanish football club based in Segovia in the autonomous community of Castile and León. Founded in 1983, it plays in Primera Provincial – Segovia, holding home games at Estadio Municipal de La Albuera, with a capacity of 6,500 seats.

== History ==
Unami was founded in 1983, with their name meaning Unión de Amigos (Friends' Union). The club initially joined futsal tournaments, opening their football section in 2004.

After achieving two consecutive promotions, the club first reached Tercera División in May 2012. After finishing in the 14th position in his first season, they suffered relegation on 11 May 2014, after a 6–3 loss to CD Bupolsa.

After winning their group in the Primera Regional in the 2020–21 campaign, Unami qualified for the 2021–22 Copa del Rey. They defeated CD Aldeano in the preliminary rounds before being knocked out by Deportivo Alavés.

== Season to season ==
| Season | Tier | Division | Place | Copa del Rey |
|---|---|---|---|---|
| 2004–05 | 7 | 2ª Prov. | 2nd | |
| 2005–06 | 6 | 1ª Prov. | 1st | |
| 2006–07 | 5 | 1ª Reg. | 11th | |
| 2007–08 | 5 | 1ª Reg. | 5th | |
| 2008–09 | 5 | 1ª Reg. | 12th | |
| 2009–10 | 5 | 1ª Reg. | 3rd | |
| 2010–11 | 5 | 1ª Reg. | 5th | |
| 2011–12 | 5 | 1ª Reg. | 2nd | |
| 2012–13 | 4 | 3ª | 14th | |
| 2013–14 | 4 | 3ª | 18th | |
| 2014–15 | 5 | 1ª Reg. | 3rd | |
| 2015–16 | 5 | 1ª Reg. | 3rd | |
| 2016–17 | 5 | 1ª Reg. | 5th | |
| 2017–18 | 5 | 1ª Reg. | 3rd | |
| 2018–19 | 5 | 1ª Reg. | 5th | |
| 2019–20 | 5 | 1ª Reg. | 5th | |
| 2020–21 | 5 | 1ª Reg. | 1st | |
| 2021–22 | 6 | 1ª Reg. | 2nd | First round |
| 2022–23 | 5 | 3ª Fed. | 15th | |
| 2023–24 | 6 | 1ª Reg. | 14th | |

| Season | Tier | Division | Place | Copa del Rey |
|---|---|---|---|---|
| 2024–25 | 7 | 1ª Prov. | 14th | |
| 2025–26 | 7 | 1ª Prov. | 5th | |
| 2026–27 | 7 | 1ª Prov. | | |

- 2 seasons in Tercera División
- 1 season in Tercera Federación
