= CA Candeleda =

Spanish football club

Candeleda
- Full name: Club Atlético Candeleda
- Founded: 1977
- Ground: El Llano, Candeleda, Castile and León, Spain
- Capacity: 2,000
- League: Primera Provincial – Ávila
- 2024–25: Primera Provincial – Ávila, 2nd of 14
Home colours	Away colours

Club Atlético Candeleda is a football team based in Candeleda in the autonomous community of Castile and León. Founded in 1977, they play in Primera Provincial – Ávila.

== Season to season ==
Season	Tier	Division	Place	Copa del Rey
1977–78	9	3ª Reg.	4th	
1978–79	9	3ª Reg.	1st	
1979–80	9	3ª Reg.	1st	
1980–81	8	3ª Reg. P.	1st	
1981–82	7	2ª Reg.	1st	
1982–83	6	1ª Reg.	10th	
1983–84	6	1ª Reg.	13th	
1984–85	6	1ª Reg.	14th	
1985–86	6	1ª Reg.	18th	
1986–87	6	1ª Reg.	8th	
1987–88	6	1ª Reg.	6th	
1988–89	6	1ª Reg.	3rd	
1989–90	6	1ª Reg.	6th	
1990–91	6	1ª Reg.	6th	
1991–92	6	1ª Reg.	11th	
1992–93	6	1ª Reg.	8th	
1993–94	6	1ª Reg.	9th	
1994–95	6	1ª Reg.	15th	
1995–96	6	1ª Reg.	8th	
1996–97	6	1ª Reg.	8th	

Season	Tier	Division	Place	Copa del Rey
1997–98	6	1ª Reg.	4th	
1998–99	6	1ª Reg.	11th	
1999–2000	6	1ª Prov.	8th	
2000–01	6	1ª Prov.	7th	
2001–02	6	1ª Prov.	6th	
2002–03	6	1ª Prov.	4th	
2003–04	6	1ª Prov.	2nd	
2004–05	6	1ª Prov.	4th	
2005–06	6	1ª Prov.	5th	
2006–07	6	1ª Prov.	1st	
2007–08	5	1ª Reg.	7th	
2008–09	5	1ª Reg.	7th	
2009–10	6	1ª Prov.	2nd	
2010–11	6	1ª Prov.	7th	
2011–12	6	1ª Prov.	5th	
2012–13	6	1ª Prov.	8th	
2013–14	6	1ª Prov.	6th	
2014–15	6	1ª Prov.	6th	
2015–16	6	1ª Prov.	5th	
2016–17	6	1ª Prov.	12th	

Season	Tier	Division	Place	Copa del Rey
2017–18	6	1ª Prov.	6th	
2018–19	6	1ª Prov.	1st	
2019–20	5	1ª Reg.	18th	
2020–21	5	1ª Reg.	7th	
2021–22	6	1ª Reg.	17th	
2022–23	7	1ª Prov.	7th	
2023–24	7	1ª Prov.	3rd	
2024–25	7	1ª Prov.	2nd	
2025–26	7	1ª Prov.		
