= CF Briviesca =

Association football club in Spain

Briviesca
- Full name: Club de Fútbol Briviesca Morato Group
- Founded: 1970
- Ground: Diego Dávila Álvarez, Briviesca, Castile and León, Spain
- Capacity: 1,500
- President: Diego Dávila Nuñez
- Manager: Pechu
- League: Primera Regional – Group A
- 2025–26: Primera Regional – Group A, 4th of 16
Home colours	Away colours

Club de Fútbol Briviesca Morato Group is a Spanish football team based in Briviesca, Burgos, in the autonomous community of Castile and León. Founded in 1970, they play in Primera Regional – Group A, holding home matches at Campo Municipal Diego Dávila Álvarez, with a capacity of 1,500 people.

== Season to season ==
Season	Tier	Division	Place	Copa del Rey
1971–72	5	1ª Reg.	1st	
1972–73	4	Reg. Pref.	18th	
1973–74	5	1ª Reg.	1st	
1974–75	5	1ª Reg.	2nd	
1975–76	5	1ª Reg.	2nd	
1976–77	5	1ª Reg.	3rd	
1977–78	6	1ª Reg.	1st	
1978–79	6	1ª Reg.	2nd	
1979–80	6	1ª Reg.	4th	
1980–81	5	Reg. Pref.	4th	
1981–82	5	Reg. Pref.	4th	
1982–83	5	Reg. Pref.	3rd	
1983–84	5	Reg. Pref.	1st	
1984–85	4	3ª	13th	
1985–86	4	3ª	9th	
1986–87	4	3ª	11th	
1987–88	4	3ª	20th	
1988–89	5	Reg. Pref.	1st	
1989–90	4	3ª	5th	
1990–91	4	3ª	17th	First round

Season	Tier	Division	Place	Copa del Rey
1991–92	4	3ª	20th	
1992–93	5	Reg. Pref.	11th	
1993–94	5	Reg. Pref.	4th	
1994–95	5	Reg. Pref.	13th	
1995–96	5	Reg. Pref.	12th	
1996–97	5	Reg. Pref.	13th	
1997–98	5	Reg. Pref.	15th	
1998–99	6	1ª Reg.	1st	
1999–2000	5	1ª Reg.	11th	
2000–01	5	1ª Reg.	7th	
2001–02	5	1ª Reg.	9th	
2002–03	5	1ª Reg.	10th	
2003–04	5	1ª Reg.	10th	
2004–05	5	1ª Reg.	9th	
2005–06	5	1ª Reg.	18th	
2006–07	6	1ª Prov.	3rd	
2007–08	6	1ª Prov.	2nd	
2008–09	6	1ª Prov.	5th	
2009–10	6	1ª Prov.	8th	
2010–11	6	1ª Prov.	1st	

Season	Tier	Division	Place	Copa del Rey
2011–12	5	1ª Reg.	13th	
2012–13	5	1ª Reg.	8th	
2013–14	5	1ª Reg.	8th	
2014–15	5	1ª Reg.	7th	
2015–16	5	1ª Reg.	6th	
2016–17	5	1ª Reg.	7th	
2017–18	5	1ª Reg.	1st	
2018–19	4	3ª	18th	
2019–20	5	1ª Reg.	4th	
2020–21	5	1ª Reg.	3rd	
2021–22	6	1ª Reg.	8th	
2022–23	6	1ª Reg.	3rd	
2023–24	6	1ª Reg.	1st	
2024–25	5	3ª Fed.	17th	
2025–26	6	1ª Reg.		

- 8 seasons in Tercera División
- 1 season in Tercera Federación
