= Betis CF =

Spanish football team

Betis Valladolid
- Full name: Betis Club de Fútbol
- Founded: 1942
- Ground: Finca Canterac, Valladolid, Castile and León, Spain
- Capacity: 2,000
- President: Chupi
- Manager: Chemy Beltrán
- League: Primera Regional – Group B
- 2025–26: Primera Regional – Group B, 2nd of 16
- Website: https://www.betiscfvalladolid.es/
Home colours	Away colours

Betis Club de Fútbol, known as Betis Valladolid, is a football team based in Valladolid in the autonomous community of Castile and León. Founded in 1942, they play in Primera Regional – Group B, holding home matches at the Campo Municipal Finca de Canterac, with a capacity of 2,000 people.

== Season to season ==
Season	Tier	Division	Place	Copa del Rey
1957–58	4	1ª Reg.	6th	
1958–59	4	1ª Reg.	5th	
1959–60	4	1ª Reg.	4th	
1960–61	4	1ª Reg.	2nd	
1961–62	4	1ª Reg.	2nd	
1962–63	4	1ª Reg.	4th	
1963–64	4	1ª Reg.	3rd	
1964–65	4	1ª Reg.	4th	
1965–66	4	1ª Reg.	3rd	
1966–67	4	1ª Reg.	7th	
1967–68	4	1ª Reg.	1st	
1968–69	4	1ª Reg.	2nd	
1969–70	4	1ª Reg.	5th	
1970–71	5	1ª Reg.	3rd	
1971–72	5	1ª Reg.	7th	
1972–73	6	2ª Reg.	6th	
1973–74	6	2ª Reg.	5th	
1974–75	6	2ª Reg.	1st	
1975–76	5	1ª Reg.	6th	
1976–77	5	1ª Reg.	5th	

Season	Tier	Division	Place	Copa del Rey
1977–78	6	1ª Reg.	1st	
1978–79	6	1ª Reg.	11th	
1979–80	6	1ª Reg.	12th	
1980–81	6	1ª Reg.	4th	
1981–82	6	1ª Reg.	4th	
1982–83	6	1ª Reg.	5th	
1983–84	6	1ª Reg.	5th	
1984–85	6	1ª Reg.	5th	
1985–86	6	1ª Reg.	3rd	
1986–87	6	1ª Reg.	10th	
1987–88	7	2ª Reg.	4th	
1988–89	6	1ª Reg.	9th	
1989–90	6	1ª Reg.	4th	
1990–91	6	1ª Reg.	12th	
1991–92	6	1ª Reg.	9th	
1992–93	5	Reg. Pref.	9th	
1993–94	5	Reg. Pref.	1st	
1994–95	4	3ª	19th	
1995–96	5	Reg. Pref.	3rd	
1996–97	5	Reg. Pref.	13th	

Season	Tier	Division	Place	Copa del Rey
1997–98	5	Reg. Pref.	4th	
1998–99	5	Reg. Pref.	3rd	
1999–2000	4	3ª	18th	
2000–01	5	1ª Reg.	7th	
2001–02	5	1ª Reg.	12th	
2002–03	5	1ª Reg.	11th	
2003–04	5	1ª Reg.	10th	
2004–05	5	1ª Reg.	13th	
2005–06	5	1ª Reg.	12th	
2006–07	5	1ª Reg.	14th	
2007–08	5	1ª Reg.	18th	
2008–09	6	1ª Prov.	10th	
2009–10	6	1ª Prov.	2nd	
2010–11	6	1ª Prov.	4th	
2011–12	6	1ª Prov.	8th	
2012–13	6	1ª Prov.	1st	
2013–14	5	1ª Reg.	12th	
2014–15	5	1ª Reg.	5th	
2015–16	5	1ª Reg.	4th	
2016–17	5	1ª Reg.	7th	

Season	Tier	Division	Place	Copa del Rey
2017–18	5	1ª Reg.	14th	
2018–19	5	1ª Reg.	13th	
2019–20	5	1ª Reg.	10th	
2020–21	5	1ª Reg.	5th	
2021–22	6	1ª Reg.	10th	
2022–23	6	1ª Reg.	10th	
2023–24	6	1ª Reg.	6th	
2024–25	6	1ª Reg.	2nd	
2025–26	6	1ª Reg.		Preliminary

- 2 seasons in Tercera División
