= CF Venta de Baños =

Spanish football team

Venta de Baños
- Full name: Club de Fútbol Venta de Baños
- Founded: 1943
- Ground: Amador Alonso, Venta de Baños, Castile and León, Spain
- Capacity: 3,500
- Chairman: (Spain) Jose María López
- Manager: (Spain) Rubén Gala
- League: Primera Regional – Group A
- 2024–25: Primera Provincial – Palencia, 3rd of 17 (promoted)
Home colours	Away colours

Club de Fútbol Venta de Baños is a Spanish football team based in Venta de Baños, in the autonomous community of Castile and León. Founded in 1943, it plays in Primera Regional – Group A, holding home games at Amador Alonso, with a capacity of 3,500 seats.

== Club's names ==
- Club Deportivo Venta de Baños — (1943–2008)
- Club de Fútbol Venta de Baños — (2008)–

== Season to season ==
Season	Tier	Division	Place	Copa del Rey
1943–1959	—	Regional	—	
1959–60	DNP			
1960–61	DNP			
1961–62	DNP			
1962–63	4	1ª Reg.	4th	
1963–64	DNP			
1964–65	DNP			
1965–66	DNP			
1966–67	4	1ª Reg.	4th	
1967–68	4	1ª Reg.	5th	
1968–69	4	1ª Reg.	6th	
1969–70	4	1ª Reg.	3rd	
1970–71	4	Reg. Pref.	10th	
1971–72	4	Reg. Pref.	11th	
1972–73	4	Reg. Pref.	6th	
1973–74	4	Reg. Pref.	7th	
1974–75	4	Reg. Pref.	11th	
1975–76	4	Reg. Pref.	12th	
1976–77	4	Reg. Pref.	5th	
1977–78	4	3ª	14th	First round

Season	Tier	Division	Place	Copa del Rey
1978–79	4	3ª	13th	Second round
1979–80	4	3ª	7th	First round
1980–81	4	3ª	8th	First round
1981–82	4	3ª	13th	
1982–83	4	3ª	11th	
1983–84	4	3ª	17th	
1984–85	4	3ª	14th	
1985–86	4	3ª	19th	
1986–87	5	Reg. Pref.	9th	
1987–88	5	Reg. Pref.	9th	
1988–89	5	Reg. Pref.	3rd	
1989–90	5	Reg. Pref.	3rd	
1990–91	5	Reg. Pref.	1st	
1991–92	4	3ª	9th	
1992–93	4	3ª	14th	
1993–94	4	3ª	13th	
1994–95	4	3ª	18th	
1995–96	5	Reg. Pref.	3rd	
1996–97	5	Reg. Pref.	8th	
1997–98	5	Reg. Pref.	3rd	

Season	Tier	Division	Place	Copa del Rey
1998–99	5	Reg. Pref.	4th	
1999–2000	4	3ª	15th	
2000–01	4	3ª	17th	
2001–02	5	1ª Reg.	4th	
2002–03	5	1ª Reg.	12th	
2003–04	5	1ª Reg.	8th	
2004–05	5	1ª Reg.	7th	
2005–06	5	1ª Reg.	16th	
2006–07	6	1ª Prov.	1st	
2007–08	5	1ª Reg.	13th	
2008–09	5	1ª Reg.	2nd	
2009–10	4	3ª	15th	
2010–11	4	3ª	20th	
2011–12	5	1ª Reg.	16th	
2012–13	6	1ª Prov.	6th	
2013–14	6	1ª Prov.	1st	
2014–15	5	1ª Reg.	6th	
2015–16	5	1ª Reg.	8th	
2016–17	5	1ª Reg.	16th	
2017–18	6	1ª Prov.	3rd	

Season	Tier	Division	Place	Copa del Rey
2018–19	5	1ª Reg.	16th	
2019–20	6	1ª Prov.	7th	
2020–21	DNP			
2021–22	7	1ª Prov.	5th	
2022–23	7	1ª Prov.	6th	
2023–24	7	1ª Prov.	8th	
2024–25	7	1ª Prov.	3rd	
2025–26	6	1ª Reg.	13th	
2026–27	7	1ª Prov.		

- 17 seasons in Tercera División

== Notable former players ==
- (Spain) Juanmi Gelabert
