= CD Cebrereña =

Spanish football team

Cebrereña
- Full name: Cultural y Deportiva Cebrereña
- Founded: 1949
- Ground: El Mancho, Cebreros, Castile and León, Spain
- Capacity: 3,000
- Chairman: (Spain) Ángel Sastre
- Manager: (Spain) Pepe García
- League: Primera Regional – Group A
- 2025–26: Primera Regional – Group A, 7th of 16
Home colours	Away colours

Cultural y Deportiva Cebrereña is a football team based in Cebreros in the autonomous community of Castile and León. Founded in 1949, it plays in the Primera Regional – Group A. Its stadium is Estadio El Mancho with a capacity of 3,000 seats.

== Season to season ==
Season	Tier	Division	Place	Copa del Rey
1966–67	6	3ª Reg.	8th	
1967–68	6	3ª Reg.	7th	
1968–69	6	3ª Reg.	4th	
1969–70	6	3ª Reg.	2nd	
1970–71	5	2ª Reg.	12th	
1971–72	5	2ª Reg.	19th	
1972–73	7	3ª Reg.	3rd	
1973–74	7	3ª Reg. P.	6th	
1974–75	7	3ª Reg. P.	11th	
1975–76	6	2ª Reg.	6th	
1976–77	6	2ª Reg.	14th	
1977–78	7	2ª Reg.	5th	
1978–79	7	2ª Reg.	7th	
1979–80	7	2ª Reg.	10th	
1980–81	7	2ª Reg.	11th	
1981–82	7	2ª Reg.	11th	
1982–83	7	2ª Reg.	2nd	
1983–84	6	1ª Reg.	17th	
1984–85	7	2ª Reg.	14th	
1985–86	7	2ª Reg.	5th	

Season	Tier	Division	Place	Copa del Rey
1986–87	6	1ª Reg.	2nd	
1987–88	6	1ª Reg.	3rd	
1988–89	6	1ª Reg.	2nd	
1989–90	6	1ª Reg.	2nd	
1990–91	6	1ª Reg.	2nd	
1991–92	6	1ª Reg.	1st	
1992–93	6	1ª Reg.	1st	
1993–94	6	1ª Reg.	3rd	
1994–95	6	1ª Reg.	7th	
1995–96	6	1ª Reg.	8th	
1996–97	6	1ª Reg.	4th	
1997–98	5	Reg. Pref.	16th	
1998–99	6	1ª Reg.	2nd	
1999–2000	5	1ª Reg.	14th	
2000–01	5	1ª Reg.	10th	
2001–02	5	1ª Reg.	13th	
2002–03	5	1ª Reg.	11th	
2003–04	5	1ª Reg.	6th	
2004–05	5	1ª Reg.	1st	
2005–06	4	3ª	19th	

Season	Tier	Division	Place	Copa del Rey
2006–07	5	1ª Reg.	4th	
2007–08	5	1ª Reg.	2nd	
2008–09	4	3ª	20th	
2009–10	5	1ª Reg.	1st	
2010–11	4	3ª	18th	
2011–12	5	1ª Reg.	3rd	
2012–13	5	1ª Reg.	1st	
2013–14	4	3ª	14th	
2014–15	4	3ª	17th	
2015–16	4	3ª	12th	
2016–17	4	3ª	16th	
2017–18	4	3ª	12th	
2018–19	4	3ª	19th	
2019–20	5	1ª Reg.	2nd	
2020–21	4	3ª	11th / 6th	
2021–22	6	1ª Reg.	5th	
2022–23	6	1ª Reg.	6th	
2023–24	6	1ª Reg.	9th	
2024–25	6	1ª Reg.	9th	
2025–26	6	1ª Reg.		

- 9 seasons in Tercera División
