= SC Uxama =

Uxama
- Full name: Sporting Club Uxama
- Founded: 3 August 1924; 102 years ago
- Ground: Municipal, Burgo de Osma-Ciudad de Osma, Castile and León, Spain
- Capacity: 1,500
- Manager: Alejandro Medel
- League: Primera Provincial – Soria
- 2025–26: Primera Regional – Group A, 14th of 16 (relegated)
Home colours	Away colours

Sporting Club Uxama is a Spanish football team based in Burgo de Osma-Ciudad de Osma, in the community of Castile and León. Founded in 1924, they play in Primera Provincial – Soria.

== History ==
Founded on 3 August 1924, the club was initially named Club Deportivo Uxama, but only started playing in regional tournaments in 1947. In 1966, the club changed name to Sporting Club Uxama, and started playing in the Aragonese Football Federation shortly after.

In 1987, Uxama achieved a first-ever promotion to Tercera Federación, but suffered immediate relegation and only returned to the category in 1991.

== Season to season ==
Season	Tier	Division	Place	Copa del Rey
1968–69	6	2ª Reg.	8th	
1969–70	DNP			
1970–71	DNP			
1971–72	6	2ª Reg.	4th	
1972–73	7	2ª Reg.	1st	
1973–74	7	2ª Reg.	2nd	
1974–75	7	2ª Reg.	1st	
1975–76	6	2ª Reg. P.	5th	
1976–77	6	2ª Reg. P.	4th	
1977–78	6	1ª Reg.	6th	
1978–79	6	1ª Reg.	3rd	
1979–80	6	1ª Reg.	5th	
1980–81	6	1ª Reg.	7th	
1981–82	6	1ª Reg.	15th	
1982–83	6	1ª Reg.	12th	
1983–84	6	1ª Reg.	3rd	
1984–85	6	1ª Reg.	12th	
1985–86	6	1ª Reg.	2nd	
1986–87	5	Reg. Pref.	1st	
1987–88	4	3ª	21st	

Season	Tier	Division	Place	Copa del Rey
1988–89	5	Reg. Pref.	17th	
1989–90	6	1ª Reg.	1st	
1990–91	5	Reg. Pref.	2nd	
1991–92	4	3ª	15th	
1992–93	4	3ª	17th	
1993–94	4	3ª	12th	
1994–95	4	3ª	15th	
1995–96	4	3ª	21st	
1996–97	5	Reg. Pref.	16th	
1997–98	5	Reg. Pref.	6th	
1998–99	5	Reg. Pref.	7th	
1999–2000	5	1ª Reg.	5th	
2000–01	5	1ª Reg.	5th	
2001–02	5	1ª Reg.	5th	
2002–03	5	1ª Reg.	2nd	
2003–04	4	3ª	20th	
2004–05	5	1ª Reg.	5th	
2005–06	5	1ª Reg.	13th	
2006–07	5	1ª Reg.	9th	
2007–08	5	1ª Reg.	14th	

Season	Tier	Division	Place	Copa del Rey
2008–09	5	1ª Reg.	13th	
2009–10	5	1ª Reg.	8th	
2010–11	5	1ª Reg.	13th	
2011–12	5	1ª Reg.	4th	
2012–13	5	1ª Reg.	10th	
2013–14	5	1ª Reg.	4th	
2014–15	5	1ª Reg.	1st	
2015–16	4	3ª	9th	
2016–17	4	3ª	17th	
2017–18	4	3ª	17th	
2018–19	4	3ª	20th	
2019–20	5	1ª Reg.	3rd	
2020–21	5	1ª Reg.	3rd	
2021–22	6	1ª Reg.	11th	
2022–23	6	1ª Reg.	11th	
2023–24	6	1ª Reg.	8th	
2024–25	6	1ª Reg.	12th	
2025–26	6	1ª Reg.	14th	
2026–27	7	1ª Prov.		

- 11 seasons in Tercera División
