= Escobar de Polendos =

- Municipality
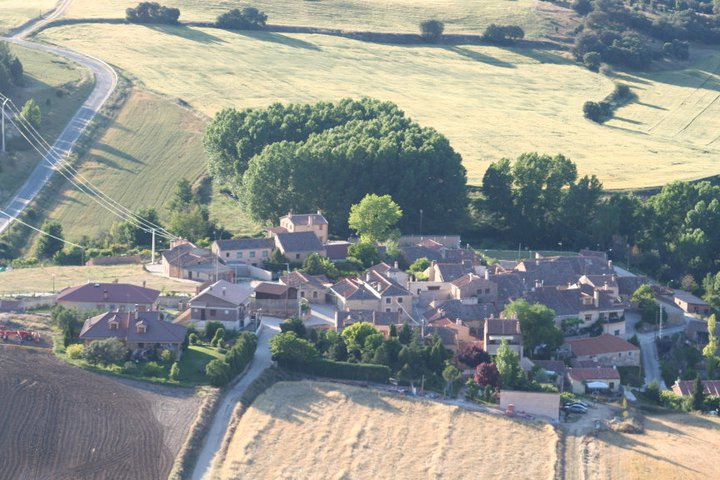
- A picture of Peñarrubias de piron

- Location in Spain. Escobar de Polendos (Spain)
- Coordinates: 41°05′26″N 4°07′51″W
- Country: Spain
- Autonomous community: Castile and León
- Province: Segovia
- Municipality: Escobar de Polendos

Area
  - Total: 39 km^{2} (15 sq mi)

Population (2025-01-01)
  - Total: 172
  - Density: 4.4/km^{2} (11/sq mi)
- Time zone: UTC+1 (CET)
  - Summer (DST): UTC+2 (CEST)
- Website: Official website

Escobar de Polendos is a municipality located in the province of Segovia, Castile and León, Spain. According to the 2004 census (INE), the municipality has a population of 245 inhabitants.
