= Viana de Cega =

Coordinates: 41°32′N 4°45′W

- Coat of arms
- Interactive map of Viana de Cega
- Country: Spain
- Autonomous community: Castile and León
- Province: Valladolid
- Municipality: Viana de Cega

Area
  - Total: 18 km^{2} (6.9 sq mi)

Population (2025-01-01)
  - Total: 2,282
  - Density: 130/km^{2} (330/sq mi)
- Time zone: UTC+1 (CET)
  - Summer (DST): UTC+2 (CEST)

Viana de Cega is a municipality located in the province of Valladolid, Castile and León, Spain. According to the 2004 census (INE), the municipality has a population of 1,716 inhabitants.

== Gallery ==
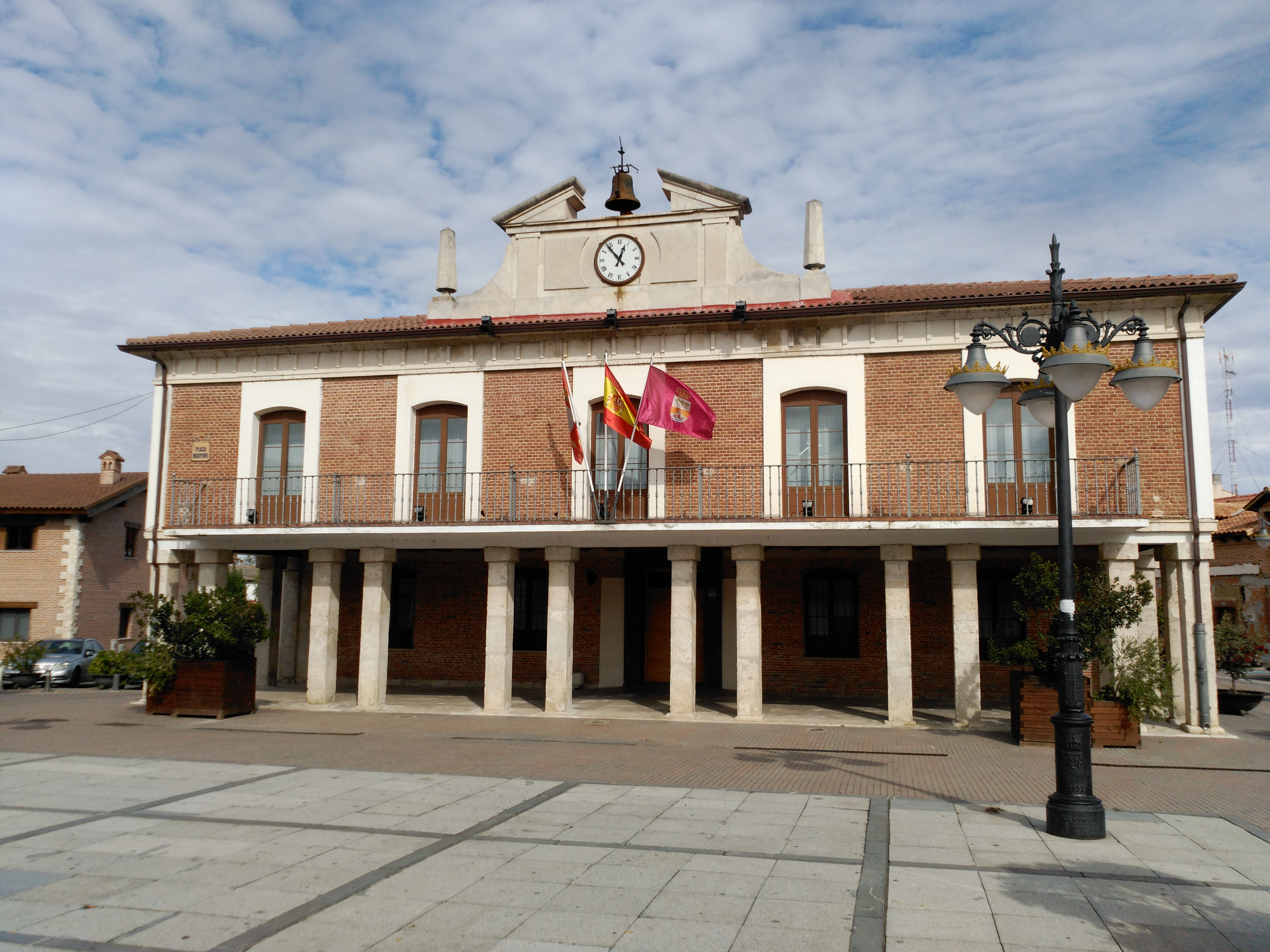
Viana de Cega - Town Hall

== See also ==
- Cuisine of the province of Valladolid
