= Quintana Redonda =

- Municipality
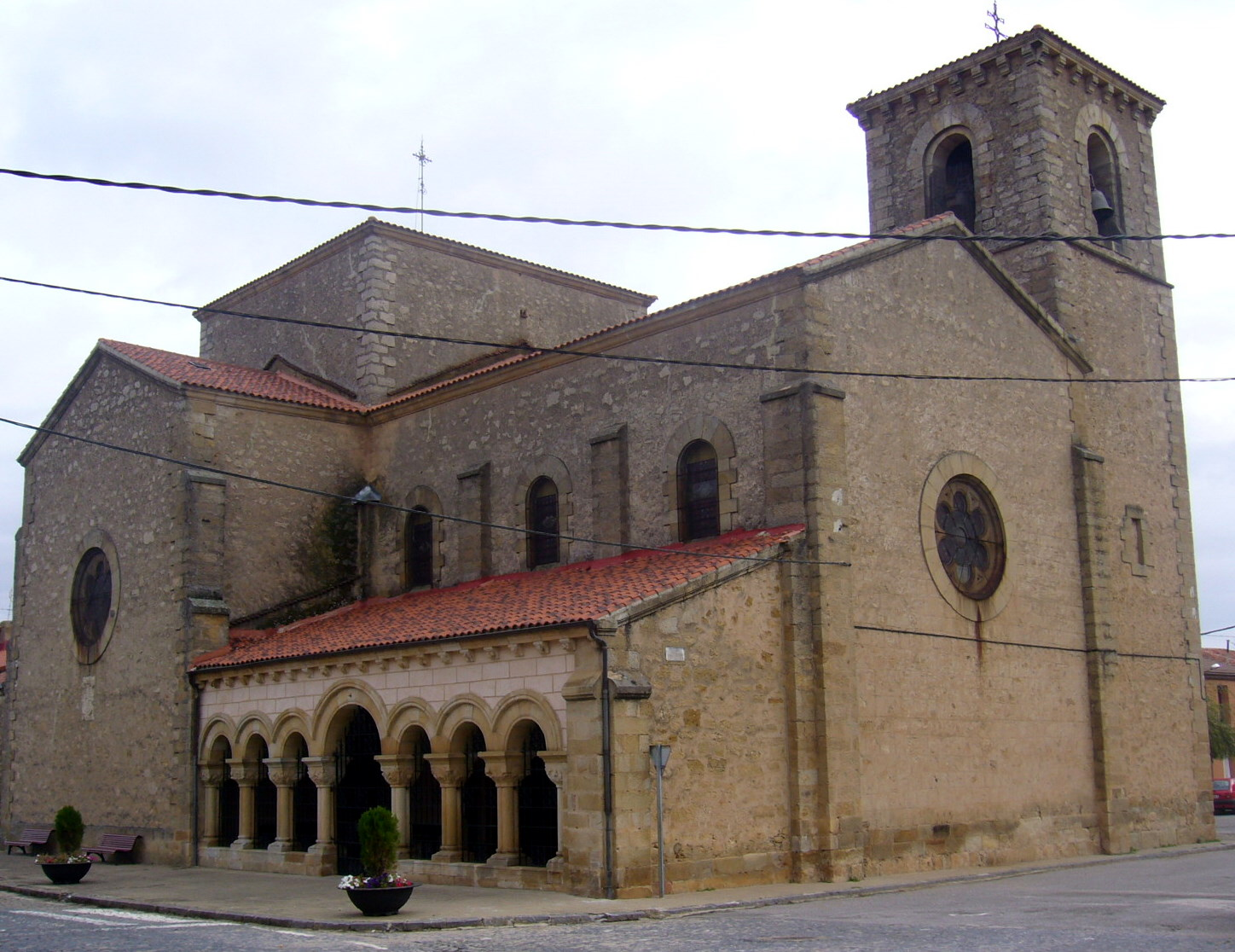
- Church of Our Lady of the Assumption of Quintana Redonda, Soria

- Flag Coat of arms

- Location in Spain. Quintana Redonda (Spain)
- Coordinates: 41°38′24″N 2°36′55″W
- Country: Spain
- Autonomous community: Castile and León
- Province: Soria
- Municipality: Quintana Redonda

Area
  - Total: 183 km^{2} (71 sq mi)

Population (2025-01-01)
  - Total: 499
  - Density: 2.73/km^{2} (7.06/sq mi)
- Time zone: UTC+1 (CET)
  - Summer (DST): UTC+2 (CEST)
- Website: Official website

Quintana Redonda is a municipality located in the province of Soria, Castile and León, Spain. According to the 2004 census (INE), the municipality has a population of 564 inhabitants.
