= CD San José =

Association football club in Spain

San José
- Full name: Club Deportivo San José
- Founded: 1978
- Ground: San Juan, Soria, Castile and León, Spain
- Capacity: 1,500
- President: Tito Hernansanz
- Manager: Carlos Carramiñana
- League: Primera Regional – Group A
- 2025–26: Primera Regional – Group A, 2nd of 16
- Website: https://cdsanjosedesoria.com/
| Home colours | Away colours |

Club Deportivo San José is a football team based in Soria in the autonomous community of Castile and León. Founded in 1978, they play in the Primera Regional – Group A, holding home matches at the Estadio San Juan de Garray, with a capacity of 1,500 people.

== Season to season ==
| Season | Tier | Division | Place | Copa del Rey |
|---|---|---|---|---|
| 2002–03 | 6 | 1ª Prov. | 3rd | |
| 2003–2007 | DNP | | | |
| 2007–08 | 6 | 1ª Prov. | 5th | |
| 2008–09 | 6 | 1ª Prov. | 1st | |
| 2009–10 | 5 | 1ª Reg. | 10th | |
| 2010–11 | 5 | 1ª Reg. | 11th | |
| 2011–12 | 5 | 1ª Reg. | 14th | |
| 2012–13 | 6 | 1ª Prov. | 2nd | |
| 2013–14 | 6 | 1ª Prov. | 1st | |
| 2014–15 | 5 | 1ª Reg. | 5th | |
| 2015–16 | 5 | 1ª Reg. | 2nd | |
| 2016–17 | 4 | 3ª | 13th | |
| 2017–18 | 4 | 3ª | 20th | |
| 2018–19 | 5 | 1ª Reg. | 8th | |
| 2019–20 | 5 | 1ª Reg. | 8th | |
| 2020–21 | 5 | 1ª Reg. | 2nd | |
| 2021–22 | 6 | 1ª Reg. | 5th | |
| 2022–23 | 6 | 1ª Reg. | 5th | |
| 2023–24 | 6 | 1ª Reg. | 4th | |
| 2024–25 | 6 | 1ª Reg. | 4th | |

| Season | Tier | Division | Place | Copa del Rey |
|---|---|---|---|---|
| 2025–26 | 6 | 1ª Reg. | 2nd | |
| 2026–27 | 6 | 1ª Reg. | | Preliminary |

- 2 seasons in Tercera División
