= Navaleno =

- Municipality
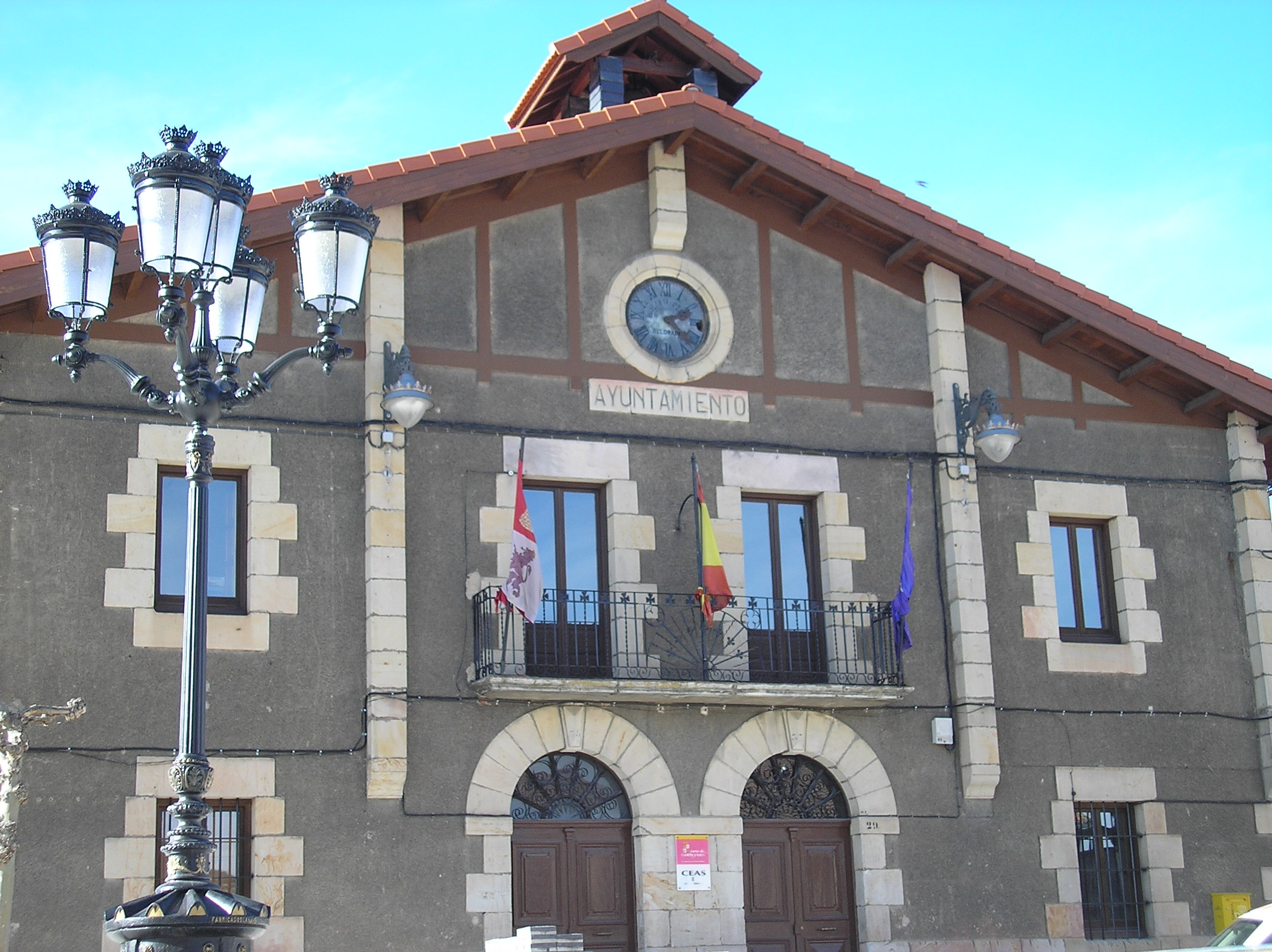
- Town Hall

- Flag Coat of arms

- Location in Spain Navaleno (Spain)
- Coordinates: 41°49′59″N 3°0′0″W
- Country: Spain
- Autonomous community: Castile and León
- Province: Soria
- Comarca: Comarca de Pinares
- Judicial district: Soria

Government
  - Mayor: Paulino Eduardo Herrero Amat (PP)

Area
  - Total: 25.03 km^{2} (9.66 sq mi)
- Elevation: 1,123 m (3,684 ft)

Population (2025-01-01)
  - Total: 698
  - Density: 27.9/km^{2} (72.2/sq mi)
- Demonym: navalenenses
- Time zone: UTC+1 (CET)
  - Summer (DST): UTC+2 (CEST)
- Postal code: 42145
- Dialing code: Government
- Website: http://www.navaleno.es

Navaleno, which means "Meadow of Hay", is a municipality located to the northwest of the province of Soria, in the autonomous community of Castile and León, in Spain.

== Geography ==
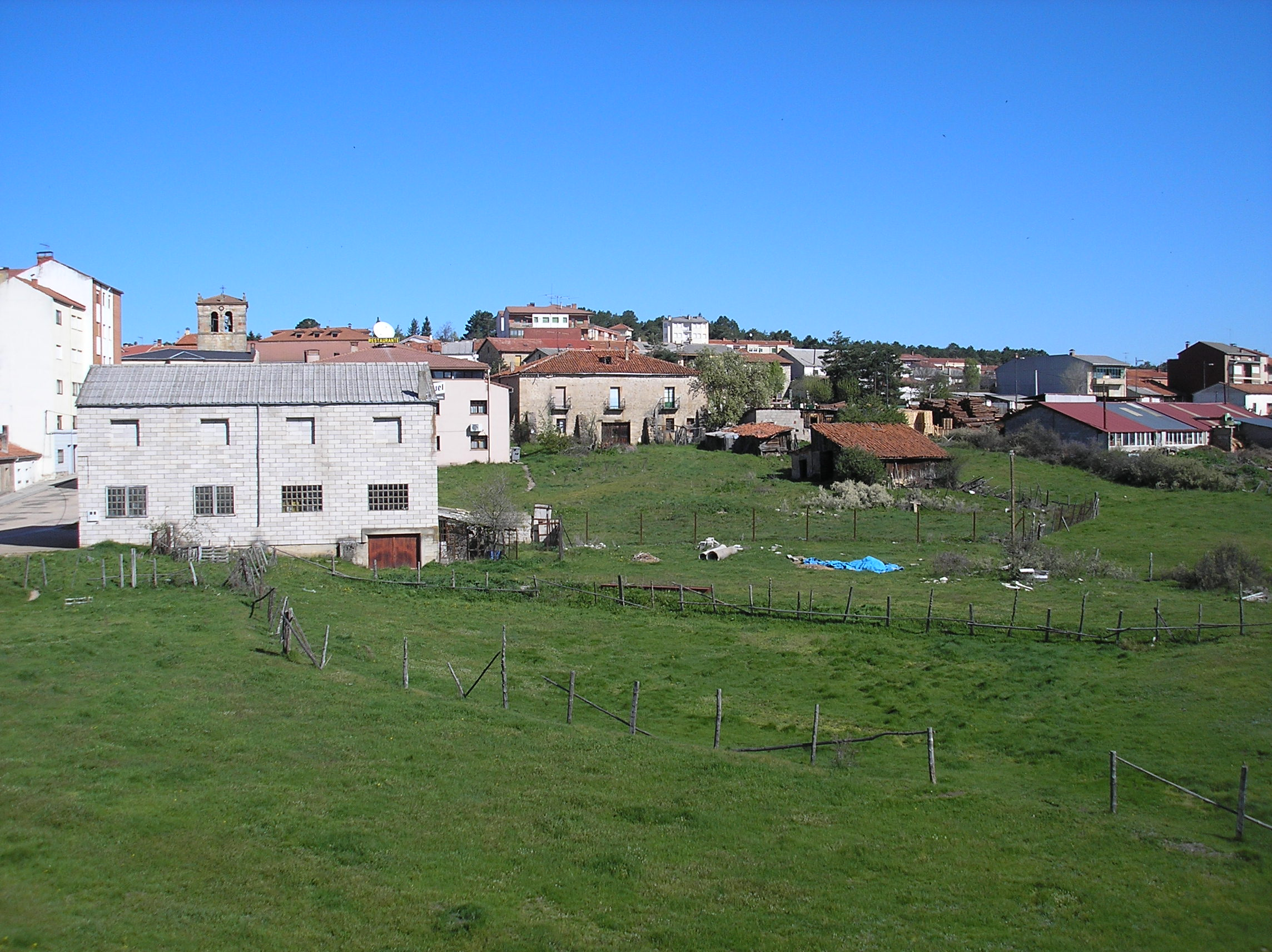
View

It is located in the zone of Low Pine Groves (Pinares Bajos) between the mountain ranges of Urbión and Resomo by the north, the mountain ranges of Nafria to the south and Cabrejas to the east. It belongs to the jurisdiction district of Soria, and is crossed by the road N-234 (Burgos-Soria), main communication way of the zone.

Population: 974 inhabitants according to the National Institute of Statistic (2005). It considerably increases the population in summer for being site of leisure, ideal for hikers.

== History ==
It belongs to the "Hermandad de la Cabaña Real de Carreteros, Burgos-Soria", (Brotherhood of the Royal Route of Cartwrights Burgos--Soria), created in the 15th century during the reign of Catholic Monarchs.

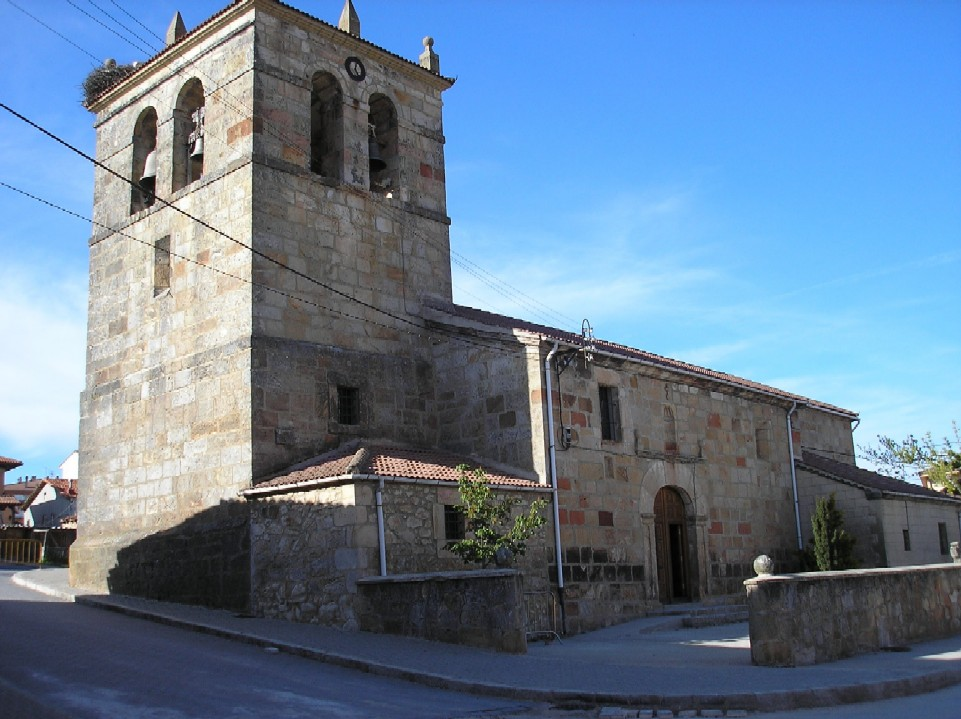
Parish Church

The Parish Church is dedicated to "San Esteban Protomártir".

== Economy ==
The economy comes mainly from the forest industry for the creation of furniture, plank, board etc. Formerly great part of the population was dedicated to the transport of carts, like the neighbour villages. Navaleno and the zone are well known by the abundance and mycological quality that is in its pine groves.

== Curiosities ==
A scene from the film Doctor Zhivago by David Lean was filmed in the local railway station. Artificial snow had to be used that year because it didn't snow as expected when they wanted to film.

== Celebrations ==
- The Celebrations of the Jesus Child - (Second Sunday of the year) with a theatre contest.
- The "pingada" May 1 - (pine of a big size, you have to climb like one greasy pole).
- The celebrations of San Roque - (from August 14 to 18).
- San Esteban (December 26 ).
