= Serranillos =

- municipality
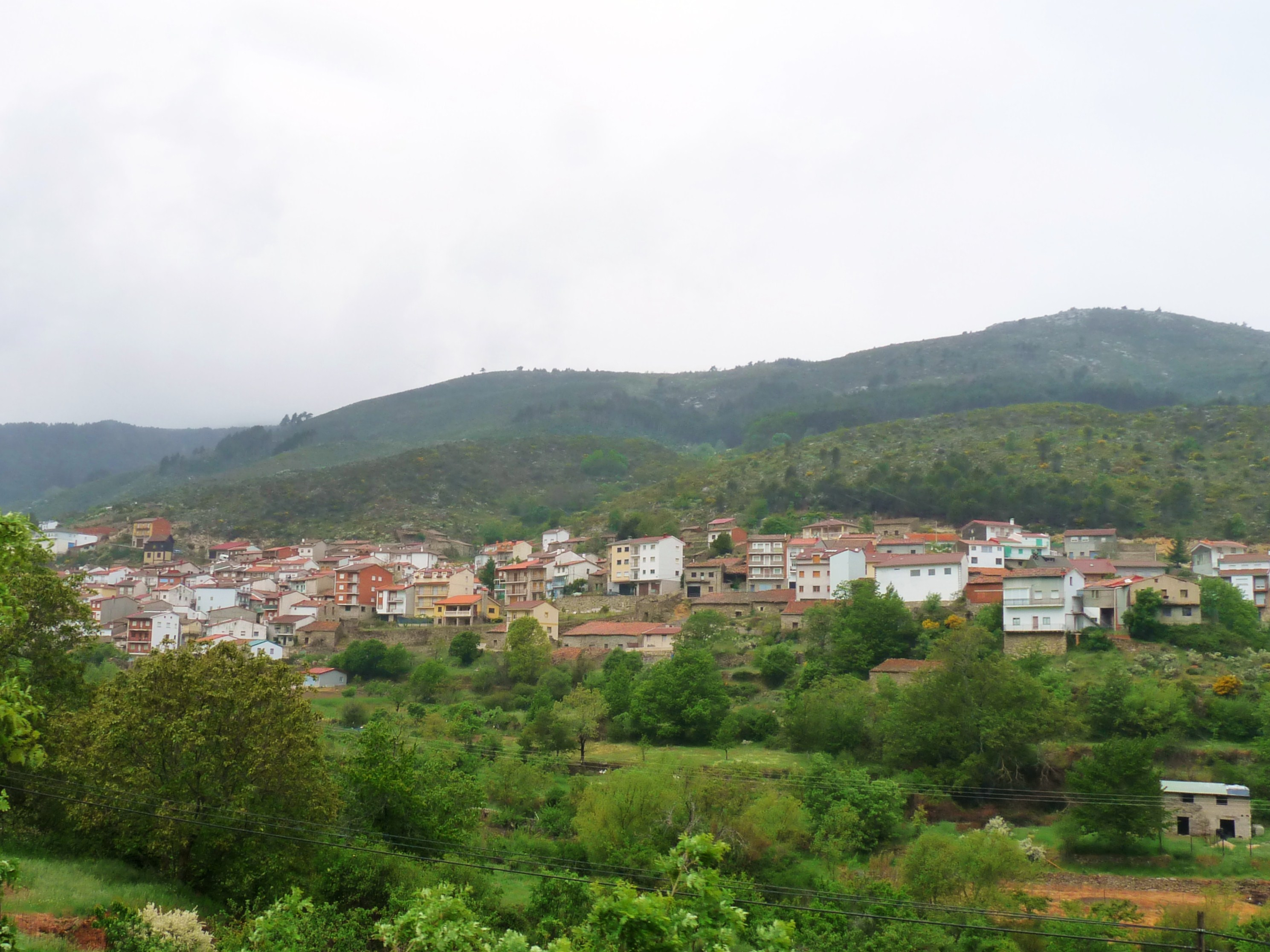
- View of Serranillos

- Flag Coat of arms

- Location in Spain. Serranillos (Spain)
- Coordinates: 40°20′09″N 4°54′42″W
- Country: Spain
- Autonomous community: Castile and León
- Province: Ávila
- Municipality: Serranillos

Area
  - Total: 20 km^{2} (7.7 sq mi)

Population (2025-01-01)
  - Total: 247
  - Density: 12/km^{2} (32/sq mi)
- Time zone: UTC+1 (CET)
  - Summer (DST): UTC+2 (CEST)
- Website: Official website

Serranillos is a municipality located in the province of Ávila, Castile and León, Spain.

== Population ==
Historical population
Year	Pop.	±% p.a.
2023	279	—
2024	252	−9.68%
2025	247	−1.98%
Source: INE
