= Renedo de Esgueva =

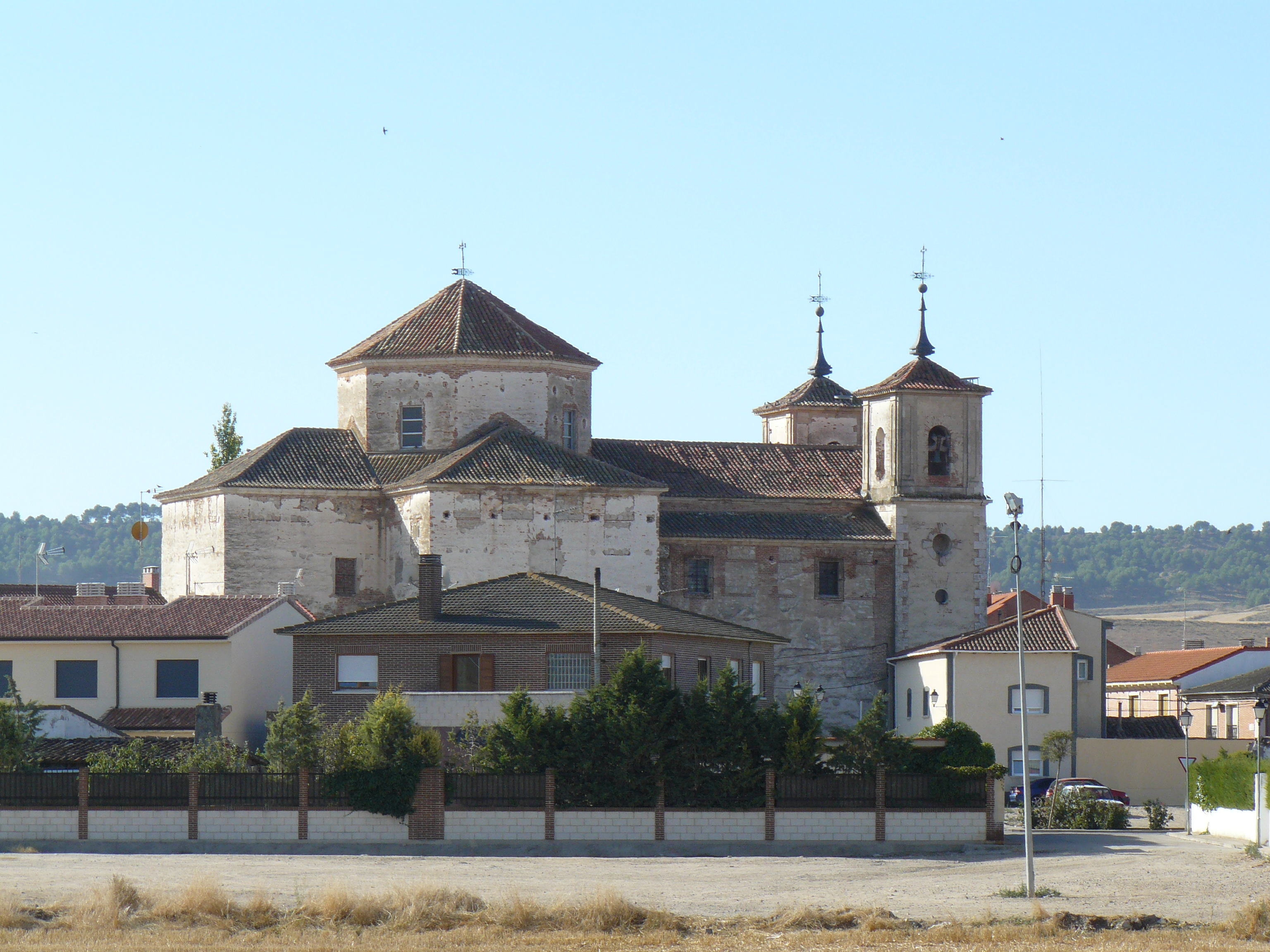
- Church of the town

- Coat of arms

- Location in Spain
- Coordinates: 41°39′N 4°37′W
- Country: Spain
- Autonomous community: Castile and León
- Province: Valladolid
- Comarca: Páramos del Esgueva

Government
  - Mayor: Antonio Ruiz Coca

Area
  - Total: 29.1 km^{2} (11.2 sq mi)
- Elevation: 711 m (2,333 ft)

Population (2025-01-01)
  - Total: 3,993
  - Density: 137/km^{2} (355/sq mi)
- Demonym: Renedienses
- Time zone: UTC+1 (CET)
  - Summer (DST): UTC+2 (CEST)
- Postal code: 47170

Renedo de Esgueva is a municipality located in the province of Valladolid, Castile and León, Spain. According to the 2011 census (INE), the municipality has a population of 3,113 inhabitants.

== See also ==
- Cuisine of the province of Valladolid
