= Navatalgordo =

- municipality
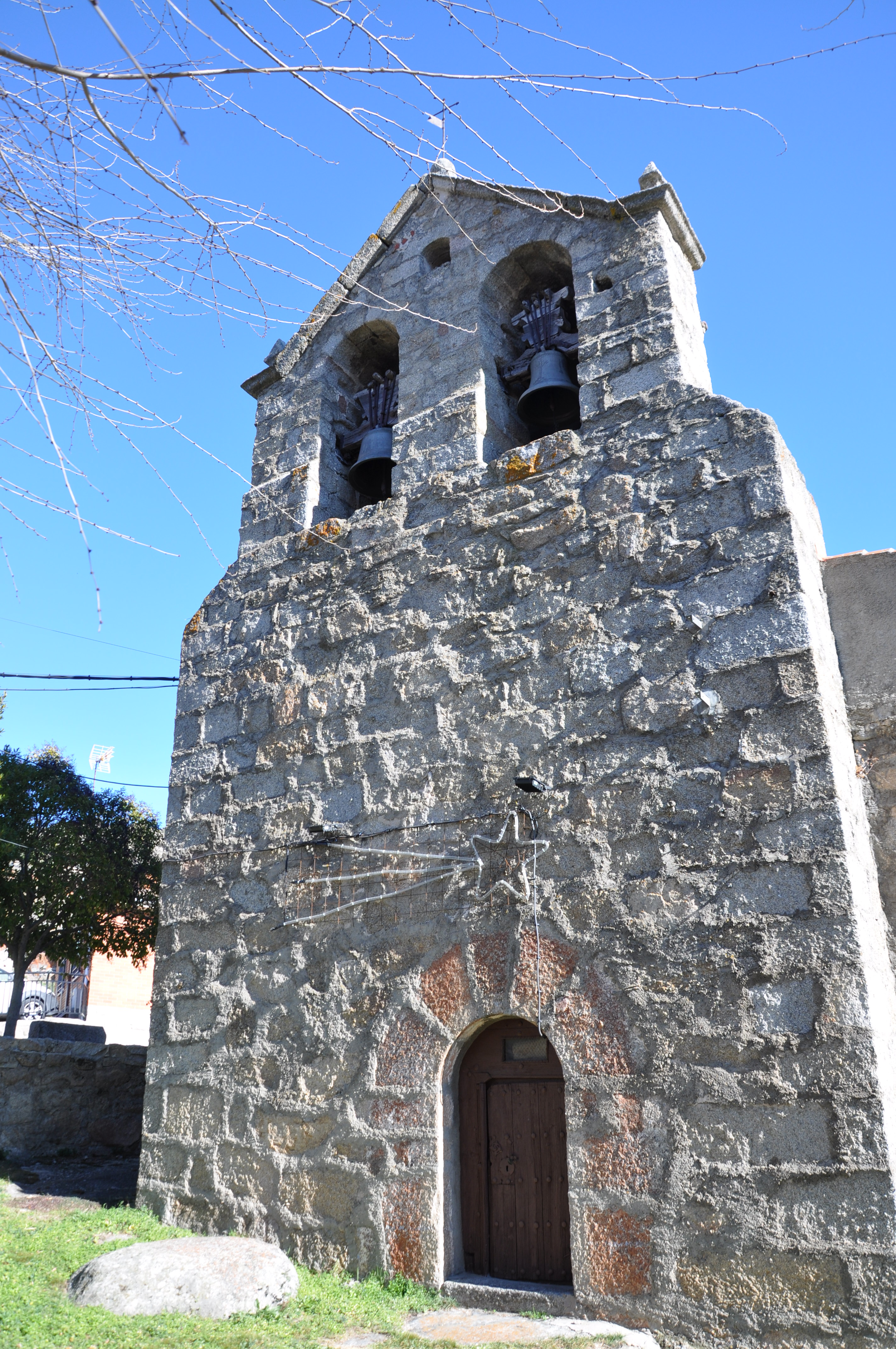
- Church of Navatalgordo

- Flag Coat of arms

- Location in Spain. Navatalgordo (Spain)
- Coordinates: 40°24′36″N 4°52′20″W
- Country: Spain
- Autonomous community: Castile and León
- Province: Ávila

Area
  - Total: 20 km^{2} (7.7 sq mi)

Population (2025-01-01)
  - Total: 230
  - Density: 12/km^{2} (30/sq mi)
- Time zone: UTC+1 (CET)
  - Summer (DST): UTC+2 (CEST)
- Website: Official website

Navatalgordo is a municipality located in the province of Ávila, Castile and León, Spain.

== Population ==
Historical population
Year	Pop.	±% p.a.
2023	238	—
2024	237	−0.42%
2025	230	−2.95%
Source: INE
