= Fresno de la Ribera =

Coordinates: 41°32′N 5°34′W

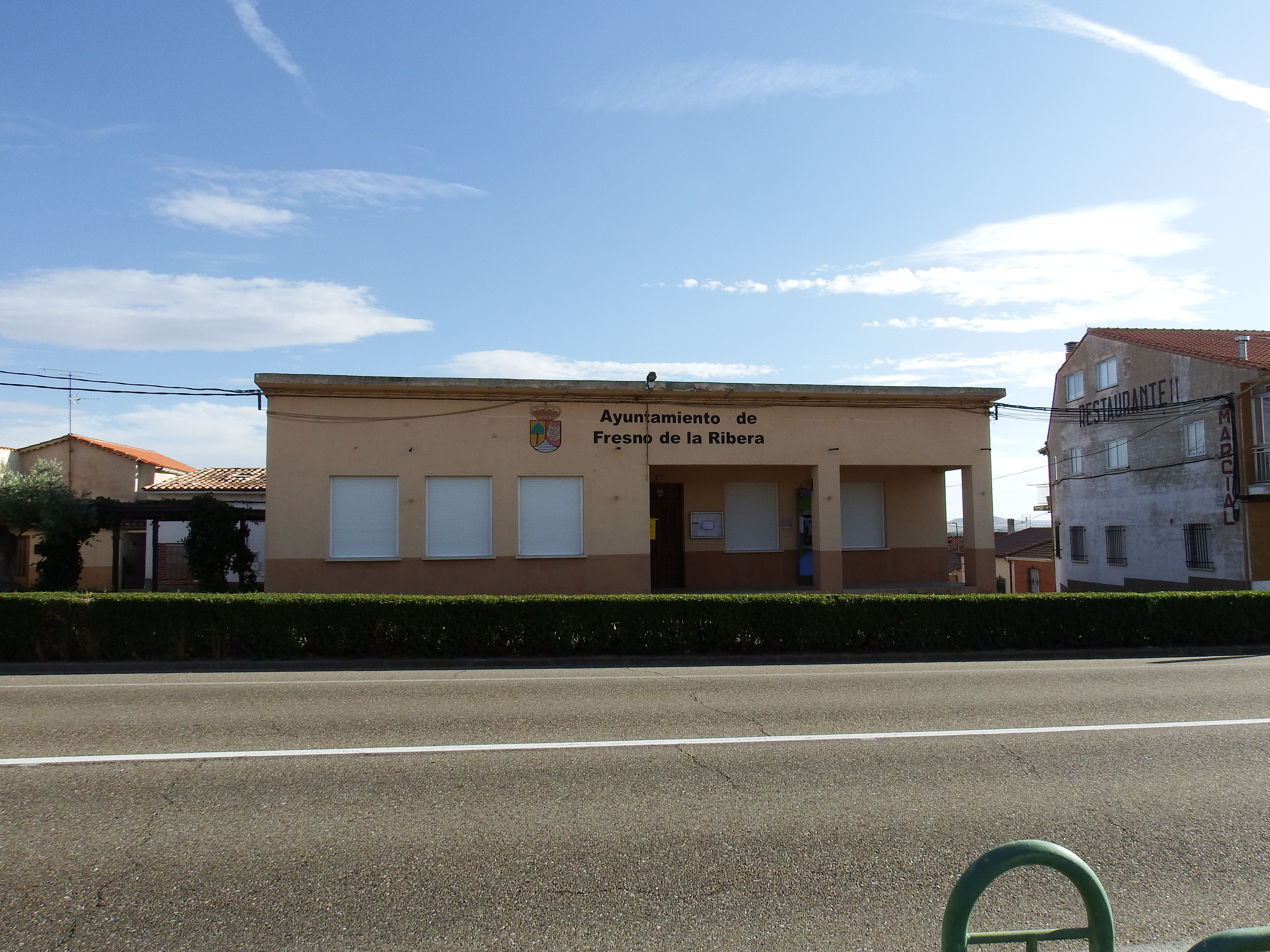

- Flag Coat of arms
- Interactive map of Fresno de la Ribera
- Country: Spain
- Autonomous community: Castile and León
- Province: Zamora
- Municipality: Fresno de la Ribera

Area
  - Total: 13 km^{2} (5.0 sq mi)

Population (2025-01-01)
  - Total: 326
  - Density: 25/km^{2} (65/sq mi)
- Time zone: UTC+1 (CET)
  - Summer (DST): UTC+2 (CEST)

Fresno de la Ribera is a municipality located in the province of Zamora, Castile and León, Spain. According to the 2009 census (INE), the municipality has a population of 397 inhabitants.
