= Navas de Oro =

- Municipality
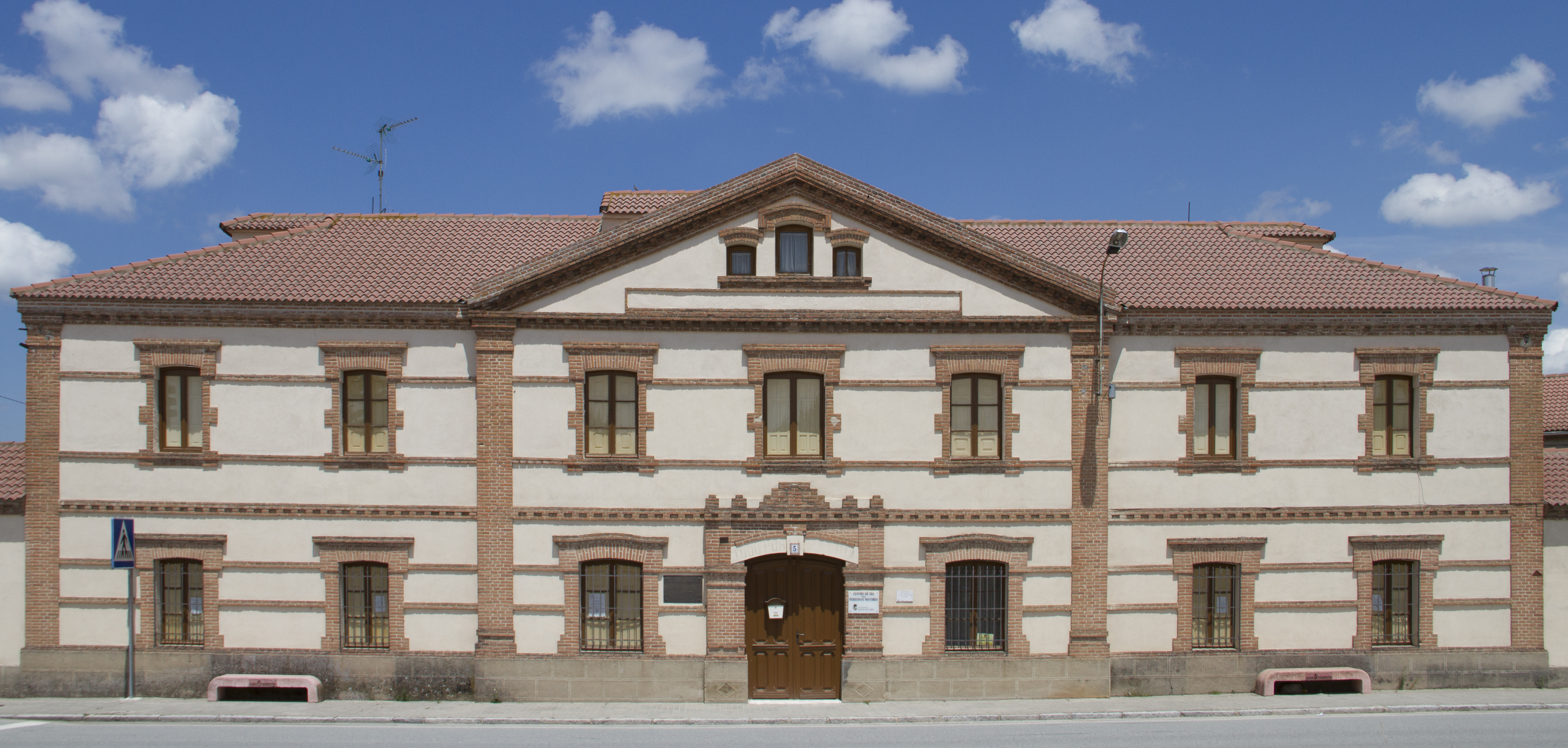
- Day Center, old Town Hall of Navas de Oro in 2018

- Flag Coat of arms

- Location in Spain. Navas de Oro (Spain)
- Coordinates: 41°11′46″N 4°26′23″W
- Country: Spain
- Autonomous community: Castile and León
- Province: Segovia
- Municipality: Navas de Oro

Area
  - Total: 62 km^{2} (24 sq mi)

Population (2025-01-01)
  - Total: 1,305
  - Density: 21/km^{2} (55/sq mi)
- Time zone: UTC+1 (CET)
  - Summer (DST): UTC+2 (CEST)
- Website: Official website

Navas de Oro is a municipality located in the province of Segovia, Castile and León, Spain. According to the 2014 census (INE), the municipality has a population of 1,402 inhabitants.
