= Castrocalbón =

Castrocalbón, Spain
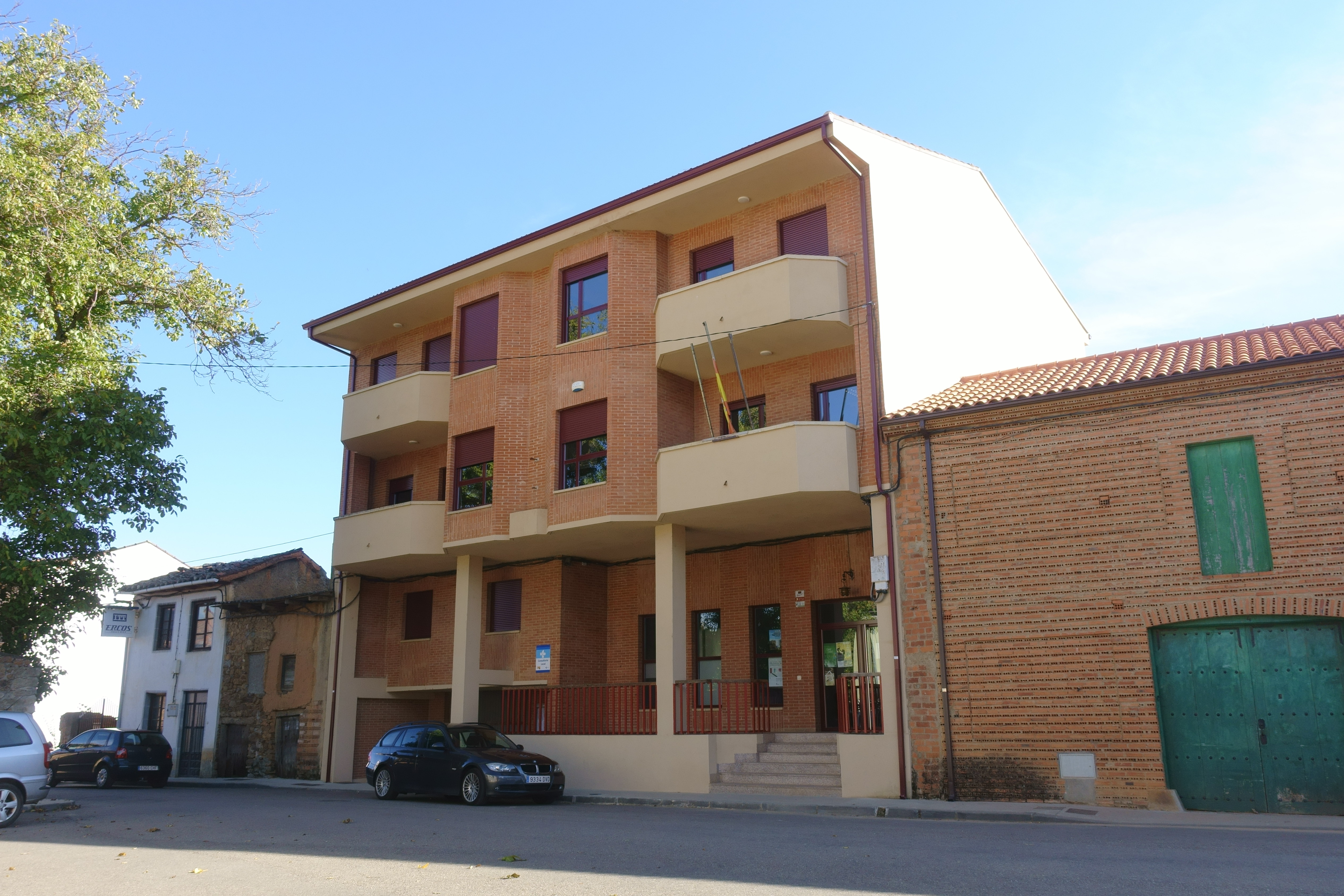
- Town hall

- Coat of arms

- Location within Spain
- Coordinates: 42°11′45″N 5°58′43″W
- Country: Spain
- Autonomous community: Castile and León
- Province: León
- Municipality: Castrocalbón

Government
  - Mayor: Luis Antonio Cenador Pérez (PSOE)

Area
  - Total: 88.30 km^{2} (34.09 sq mi)
- Elevation: 810 m (2,660 ft)

Population (2025-01-01)
  - Total: 898
  - Density: 10.2/km^{2} (26.3/sq mi)
- Demonym(s): castrocalbonense; castrocalbonés, castrocalbonesa
- Time zone: UTC+1 (CET)
  - Summer (DST): UTC+2 (CEST)
- Postal Code: 24760
- Telephone prefix: 987
- Website: Ayto. de Castrocalbón

Castrocalbón (Spanish pronunciation: [kastɾokalˈβon]) is a municipality located in the province of León, Castile and León, Spain. According to the 2010 census (INE), the municipality has a population of 1,081 inhabitants.
