= Valdestillas =

Coordinates: 41°28′N 4°46′W

Valdestillas, Spain
- Flag Coat of arms

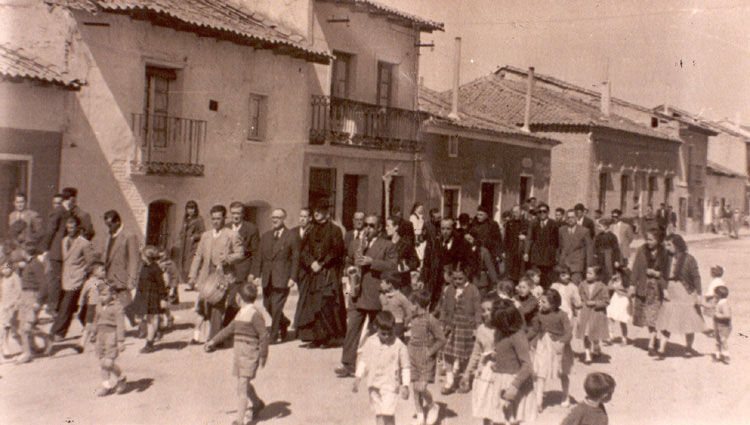
- Country: Spain
- Autonomous community: Castile and León
- Province: Valladolid
- Municipality: Valdestillas

Area
  - Total: 36 km^{2} (14 sq mi)

Population (2025-01-01)
  - Total: 1,634
  - Density: 45/km^{2} (120/sq mi)
- Time zone: UTC+1 (CET)
  - Summer (DST): UTC+2 (CEST)

Valdestillas is a municipality located in the province of Valladolid, Castile and León, Spain. According to the 2008 census (INE), the municipality has a population of 1,818 inhabitants.

== See also ==
- Cuisine of the province of Valladolid
