= Santa Croya de Tera =

Coordinates: 41°59′N 5°58′W

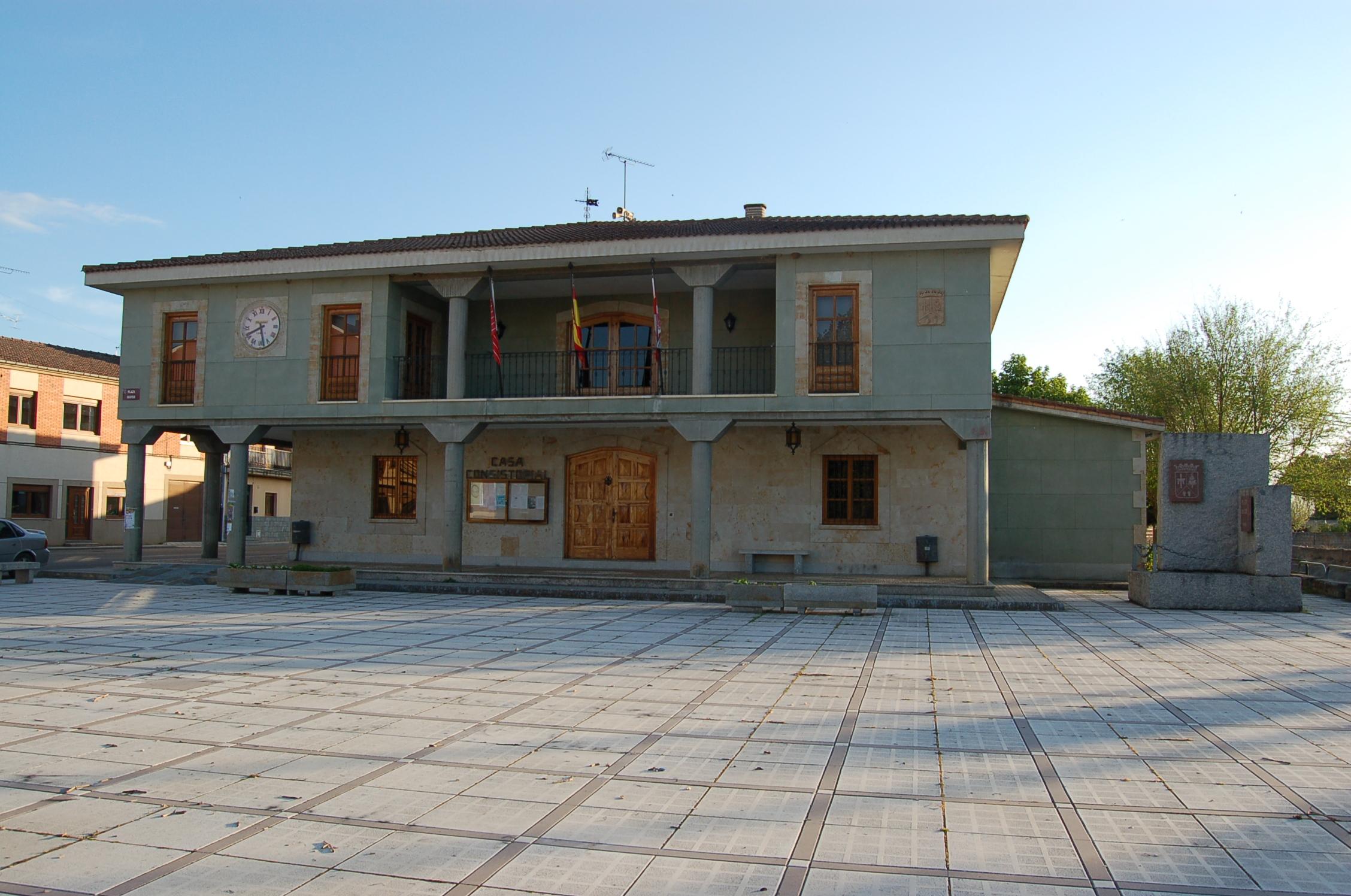

- Coat of arms
- Interactive map of Santa Croya de Tera
- Country: Spain
- Autonomous community: Castile and León
- Province: Zamora
- Municipality: Santa Croya de Tera

Area
  - Total: 21 km^{2} (8.1 sq mi)

Population (2025-01-01)
  - Total: 253
  - Density: 12/km^{2} (31/sq mi)
- Time zone: UTC+1 (CET)
  - Summer (DST): UTC+2 (CEST)
- Website: Official website

Santa Croya de Tera is a municipality located in the province of Zamora, Castile and León, Spain. According to the 2004 census (INE), the municipality has a population of 422 inhabitants.
