= Hontanares de Eresma =

- Municipality
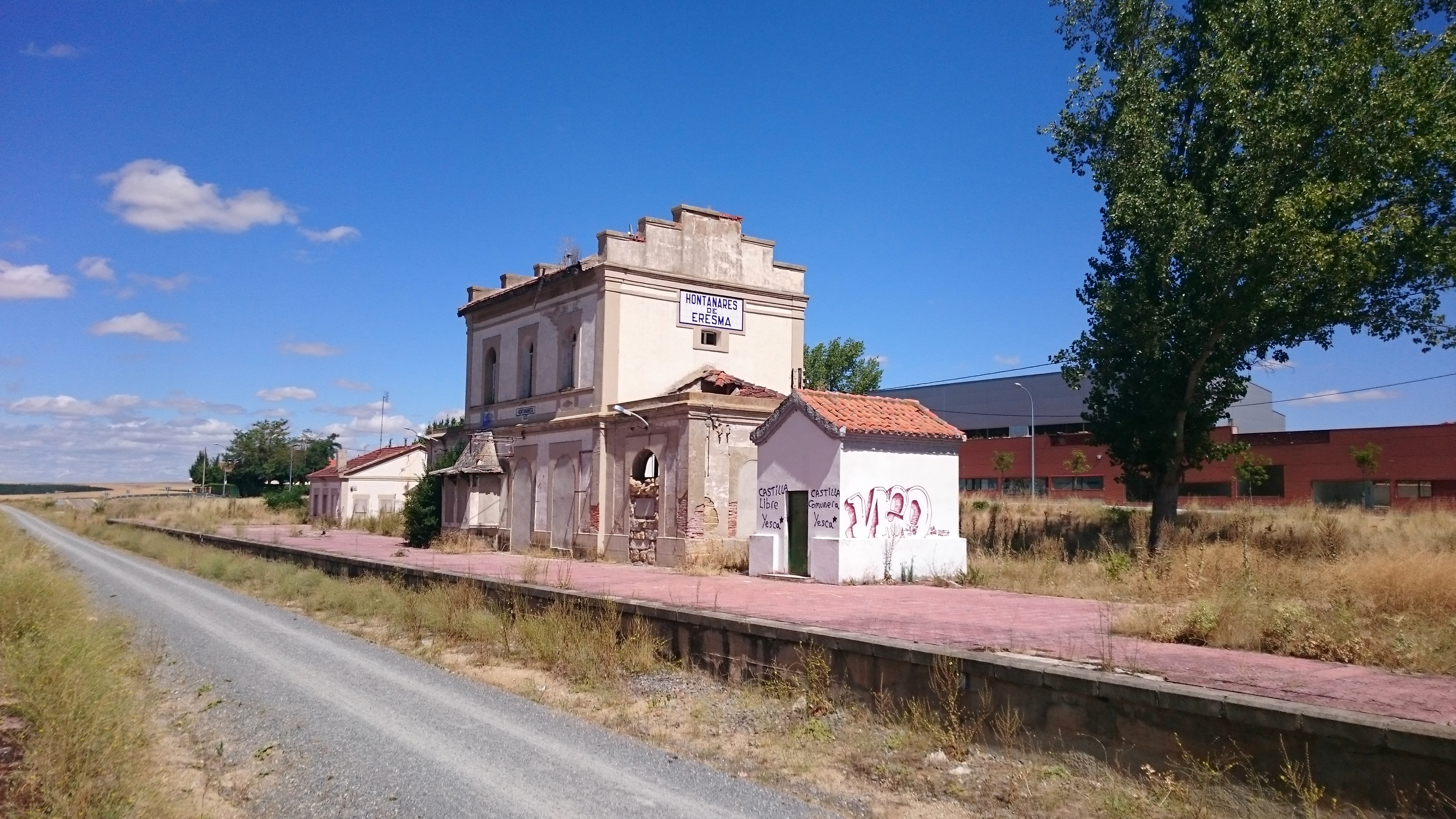
- Access to the neighbourhood of La Estación

- Flag Coat of arms

- Location in Spain. Hontanares de Eresma (Spain)
- Coordinates: 40°58′58″N 4°12′12″W
- Country: Spain
- Autonomous community: Castile and León
- Province: Segovia
- Municipality: Hontanares de Eresma

Area
  - Total: 6 km^{2} (2.3 sq mi)

Population (2025-01-01)
  - Total: 1,680
  - Density: 280/km^{2} (730/sq mi)
- Time zone: UTC+1 (CET)
  - Summer (DST): UTC+2 (CEST)
- Website: Official website

Hontanares de Eresma is a municipality located in the province of Segovia, Castile and León, Spain. According to the 2004 census (INE), the municipality has a population of 249 inhabitants.
