= Prádena =

- Municipality
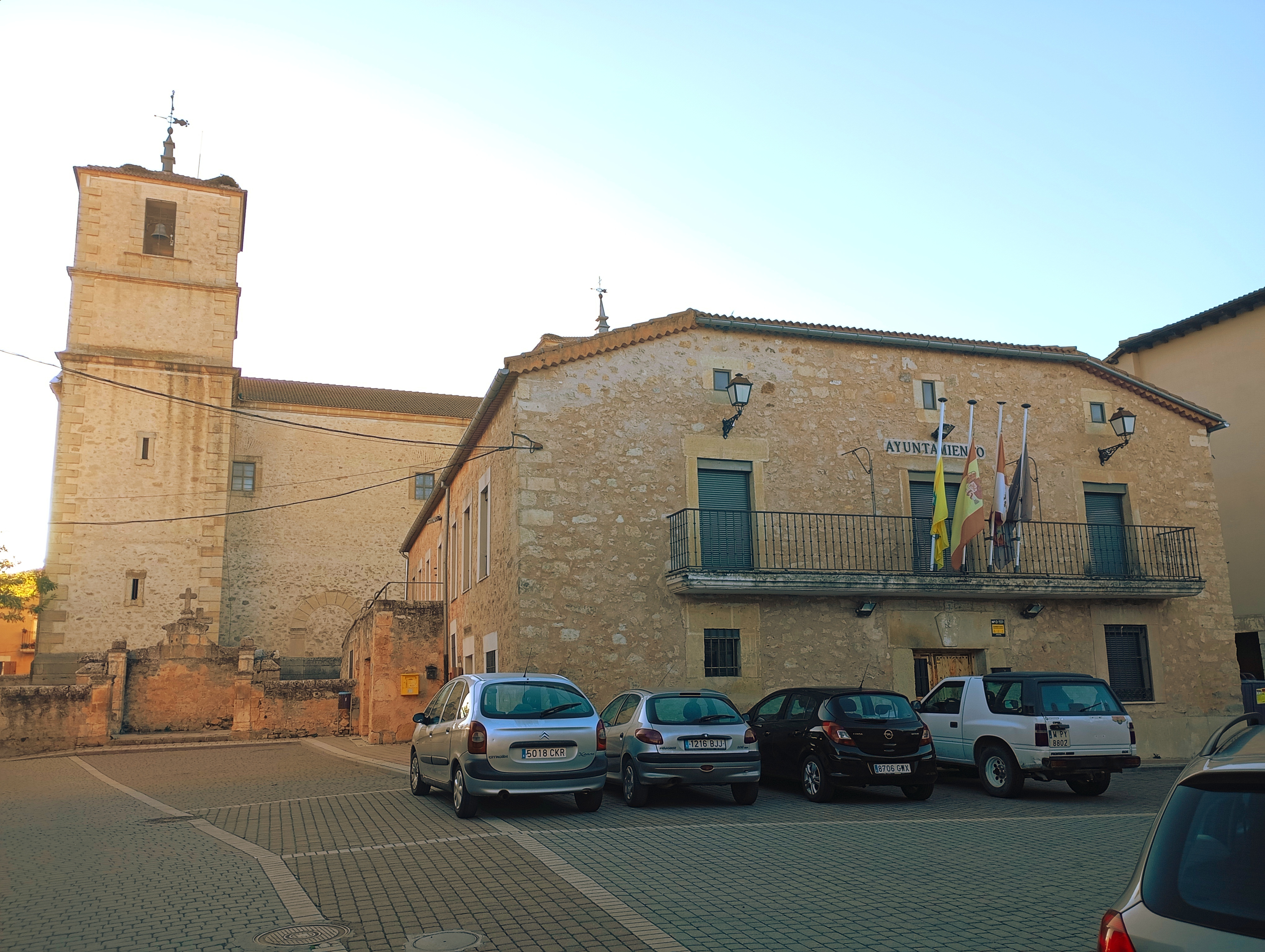
- Plaza de la Constitución in Prádena, view of the Church of San Martín and the town hall, seat of the city council

- Flag Coat of arms

- Location in Spain. Prádena (Spain)
- Coordinates: 41°08′20″N 3°41′18″W
- Country: Spain
- Autonomous community: Castile and León
- Province: Segovia
- Municipality: Prádena

Area
  - Total: 46.33 km^{2} (17.89 sq mi)
- Elevation: 1,119 m (3,671 ft)

Population (2025-01-01)
  - Total: 473
  - Density: 10.2/km^{2} (26.4/sq mi)
- Time zone: UTC+1 (CET)
  - Summer (DST): UTC+2 (CEST)
- Website: Official website

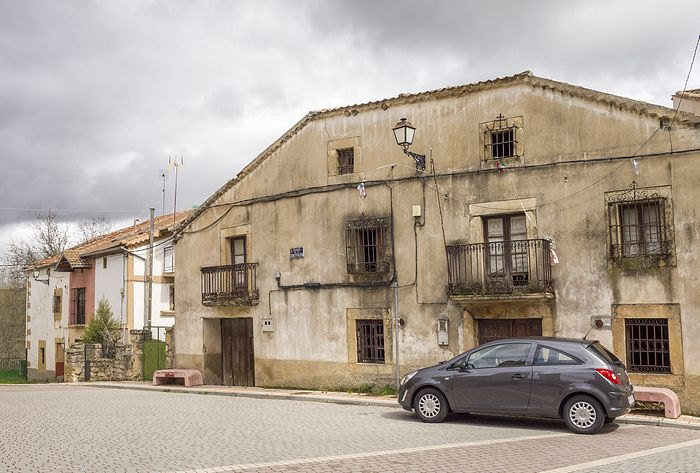
Typical Segovian house with two slopes without vertex

Prádena is a municipality located in the province of Segovia, Castile and León, Spain. According to the 2023 census (INE), the municipality had a population of 487 inhabitants.

It is located next to the N-110 highway, 39 km from Segovia. Its hamlet is Castroserna de Arriba, which was an independent municipality until its incorporation in 1975.
