= Villalobón =

Coordinates: 42°02′N 4°30′W

- municipality
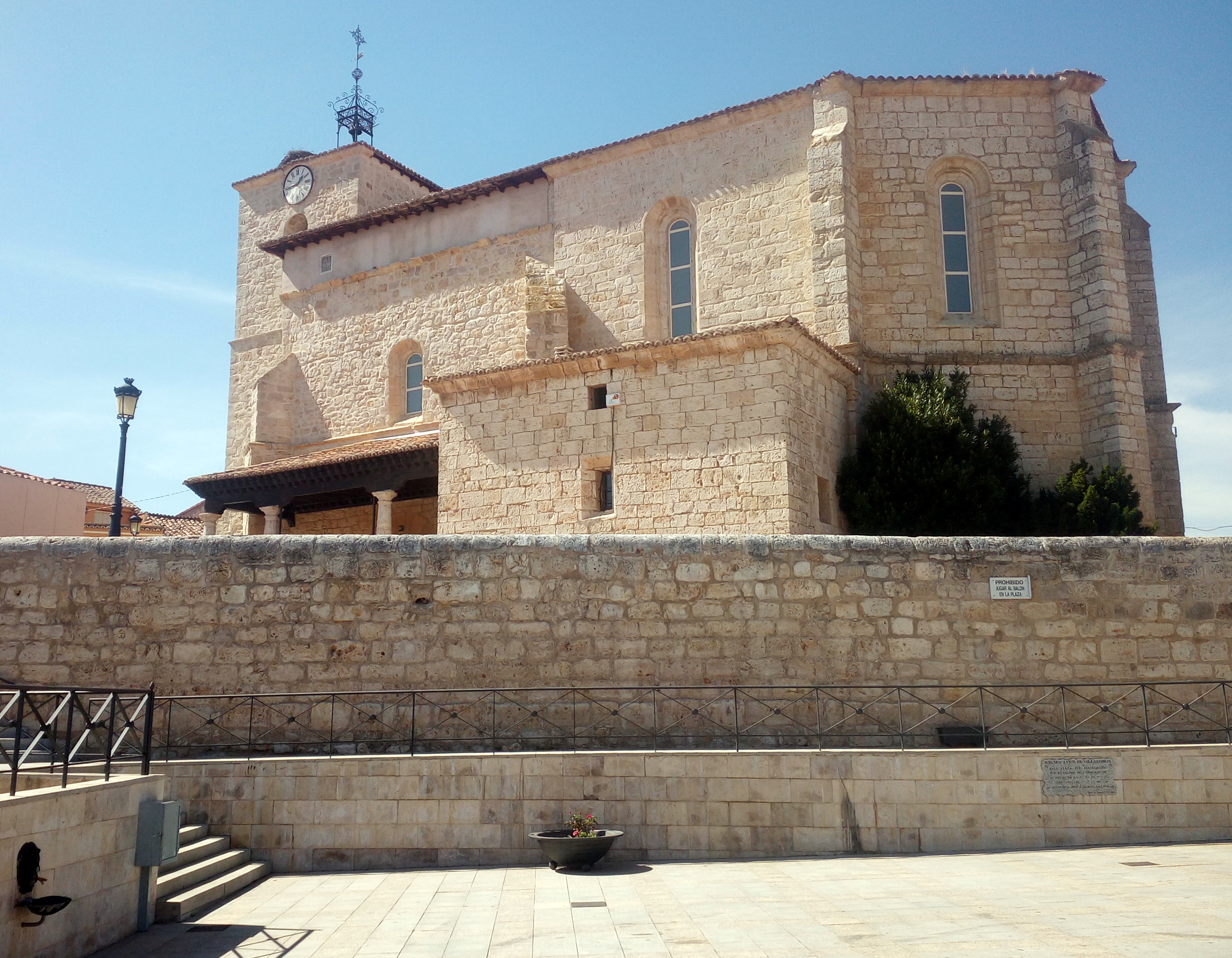

- Flag Coat of arms
- Interactive map of Villalobón
- Country: Spain
- Autonomous community: Castile and León
- Province: Palencia
- Municipality: Villalobón

Area
  - Total: 18 km^{2} (6.9 sq mi)

Population (2025-01-01)
  - Total: 1,955
  - Density: 110/km^{2} (280/sq mi)
- Time zone: UTC+1 (CET)
  - Summer (DST): UTC+2 (CEST)
- Website: Official website

Villalobón is a municipality located in the province of Palencia, Castile and León, Spain. According to the 2004 census (INE), the municipality has a population of 608 inhabitants.
