= Cabezuela =

- Municipality
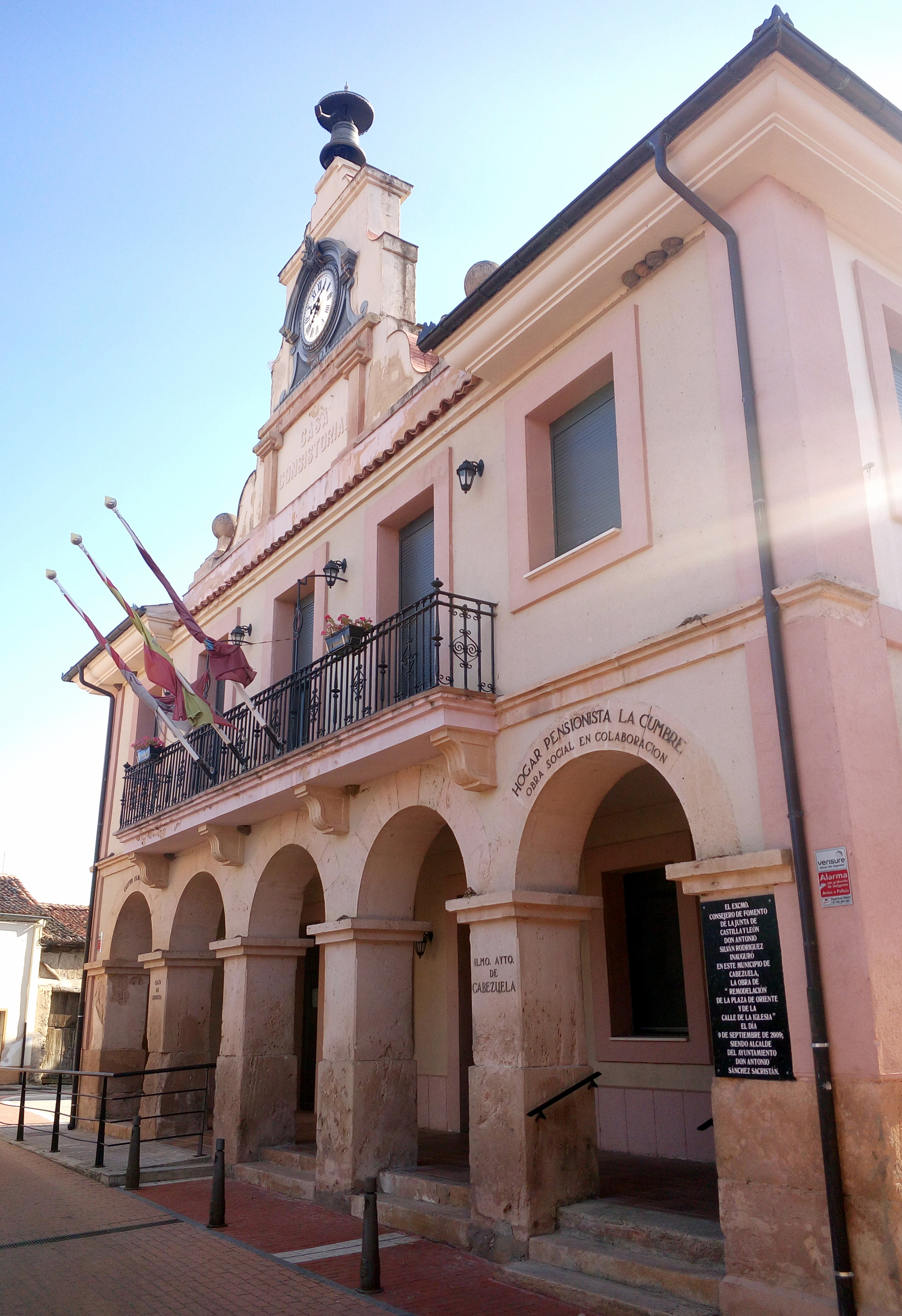
- Town hall in Cabezuela, Segovia, Spain.

- Location in Spain. Cabezuela (Spain)
- Coordinates: 41°14′07″N 3°55′58″W
- Country: Spain
- Autonomous community: Castile and León
- Province: Segovia
- Municipality: Cabezuela

Area
  - Total: 35.25 km^{2} (13.61 sq mi)
- Elevation: 957 m (3,140 ft)

Population (2025-01-01)
  - Total: 655
  - Density: 18.6/km^{2} (48.1/sq mi)
- Time zone: UTC+1 (CET)
  - Summer (DST): UTC+2 (CEST)
- Website: Official website

Cabezuela is a municipality located in the province of Segovia, Castile and León, Spain. According to the 2004 census (INE), the municipality had a population of 719 inhabitants.
