= Carbonero el Mayor =

- Municipality
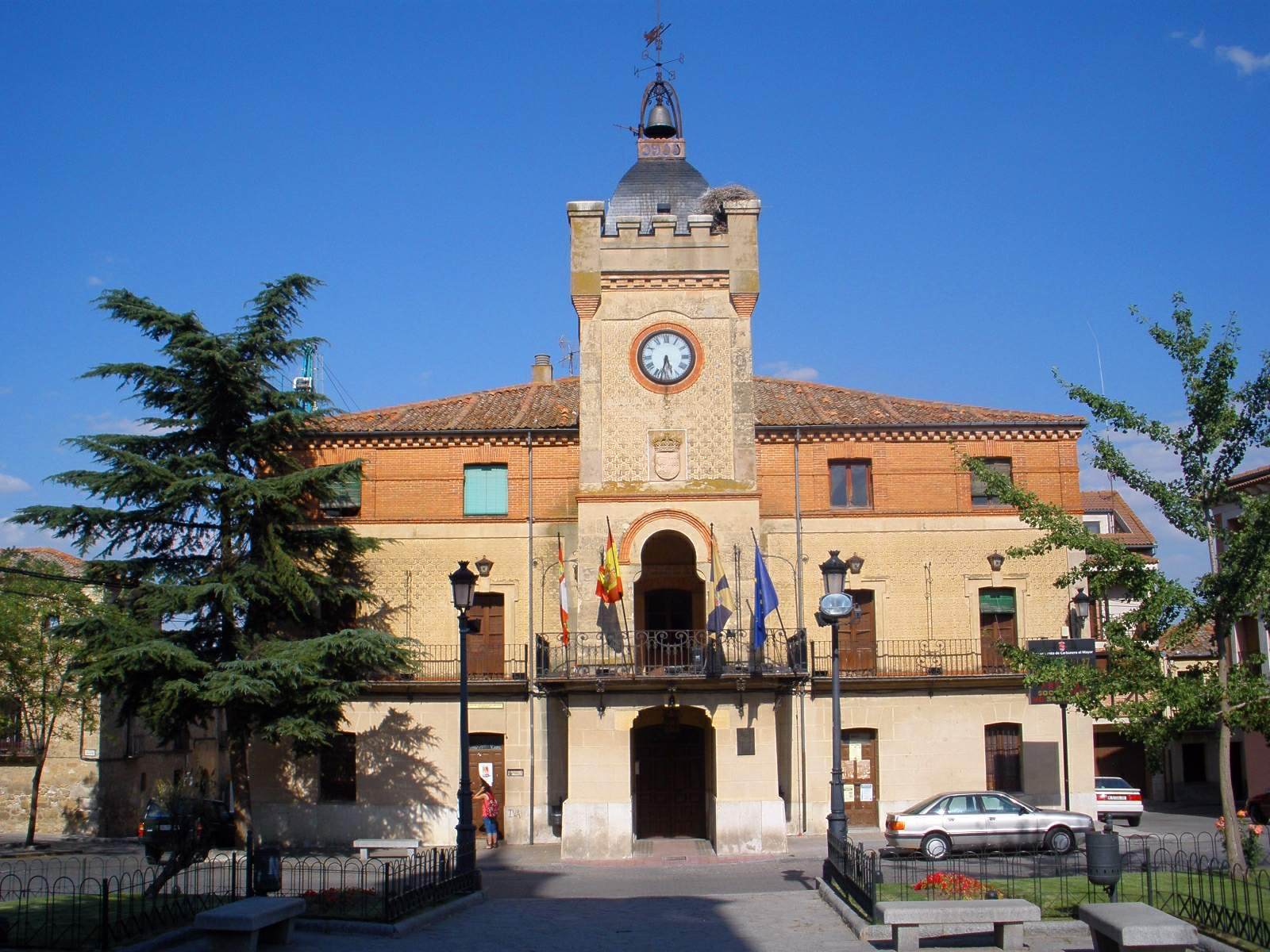
- Town hall

- Flag Coat of arms

- Location in Spain. Carbonero el Mayor (Spain)
- Coordinates: 41°07′21″N 4°15′58″W
- Country: Spain
- Autonomous community: Castile and León
- Province: Segovia
- Comarca: Villa y Tierra de Sepúlveda

Government
  - Mayor: María Ángeles García Herrero

Area
  - Total: 66.35 km^{2} (25.62 sq mi)
- Elevation: 917 m (3,009 ft)

Population (2025-01-01)
  - Total: 2,463
  - Density: 37.12/km^{2} (96.14/sq mi)
- Demonym: carbonerense
- Time zone: UTC+1 (CET)
  - Summer (DST): UTC+2 (CEST)
- Postal code: 40593
- Website: Official website

Carbonero el Mayor is a municipality located in the province of Segovia, Castile and León, Spain. According to the 2004 census (INE), the municipality has a population of 2,469 inhabitants.

== Etymology ==
The name Carbonero is derived from the Spanish word for charcoal, the region was previously covered in abundant oak forests, creating an industry for the manufacturing of charcoal through means of incomplete combustion. The word "Mayor" was added to the name in order to differentiate the municipality from nearby villages such as, Carbonero de Ahusín

== History ==
Little evidence of the Iron Age has ever been discovered around Carbonero el Mayor but the municipality is situated in a region with significant celtiberian influence. Evidence of the Roman Empire has been discovered in Carbonero el Mayor in the form of Roman currency and the possible remains of a Roman road linking Segovia with Coca, Segovia.

== Economy ==
The local economy is made up of a number of industries, namely food production (meat), ceramics, and traditional farming.

Production of ham is an important industry within Carbonero el Mayor. A notable local company, Monte Nevado, is well known for offering a high-quality Mangalica ham, a relative of the Iberian ham. Another company to be highlighted is Jamones Mariano Pascual, famed for its high-quality Ibérico ham and jamón serrano.
