= La Pedraja de Portillo =

La Pedraja de Portillo, Spain
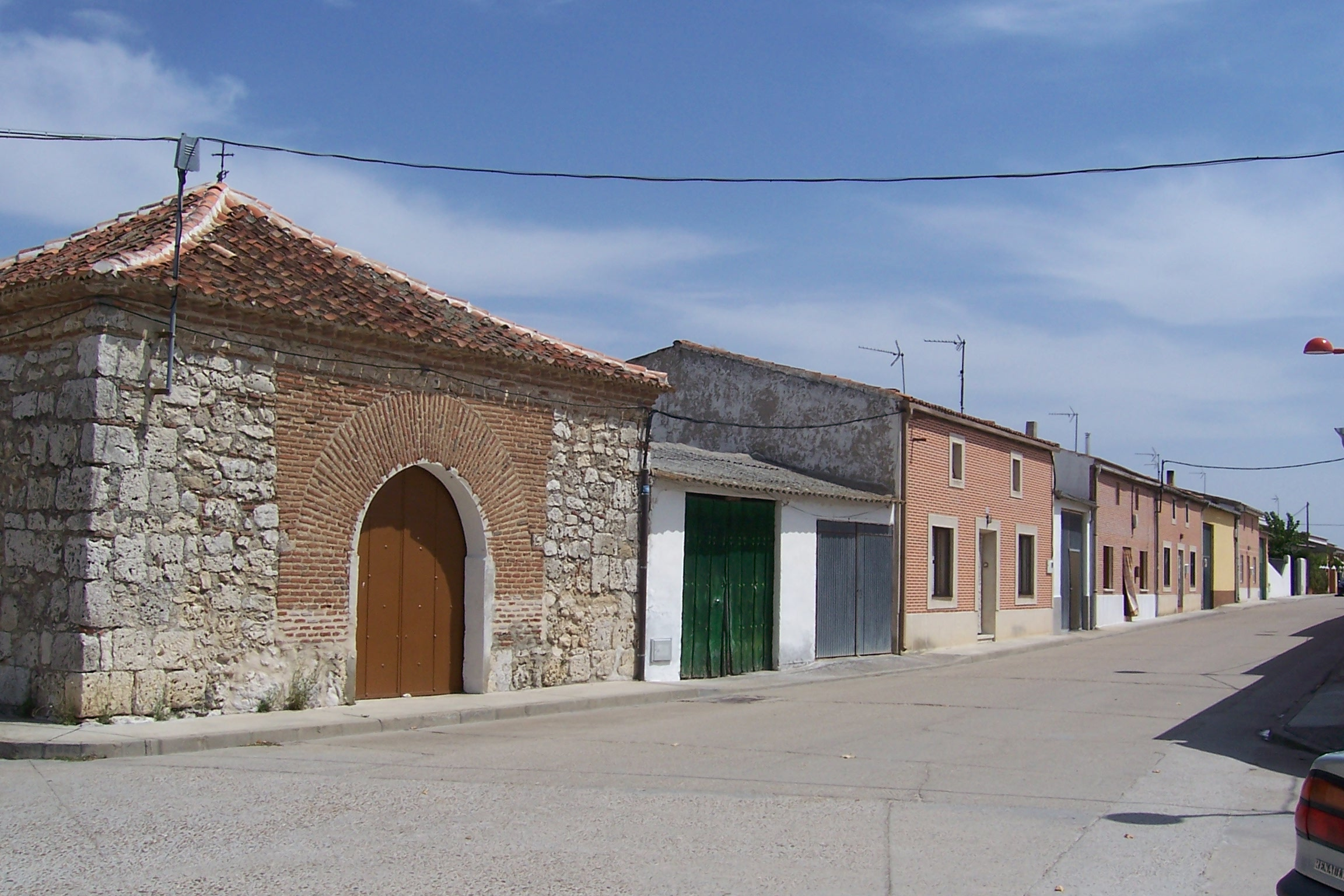
- view of La Pedraja de Portillo

- Flag Coat of arms
- Interactive map of La Pedraja de Portillo, Spain
- Coordinates: 41°28′17″N 4°38′49″W
- Country: Spain
- Autonomous community: Castile and León
- Province: Valladolid
- Municipality: La Pedraja de Portillo

Government
  - Alcalde: Henar González Salamanca (2011) (PP)

Area
  - Total: 56 km^{2} (22 sq mi)
- Elevation: 717 m (2,352 ft)

Population (2025-01-01)
  - Total: 1,186
  - Density: 21/km^{2} (55/sq mi)
- Time zone: UTC+1 (CET)
  - Summer (DST): UTC+2 (CEST)
- Dialing code: 983
- Website: Official Site

La Pedraja de Portillo is a municipality located in the province of Valladolid, Castile and León, Spain. According to the 2004 census (INE), the municipality has a population of 1,076 inhabitants.
