= Onzonilla =

Coordinates: 42°32′N 5°35′W

Onzonilla, Spain
- municipality
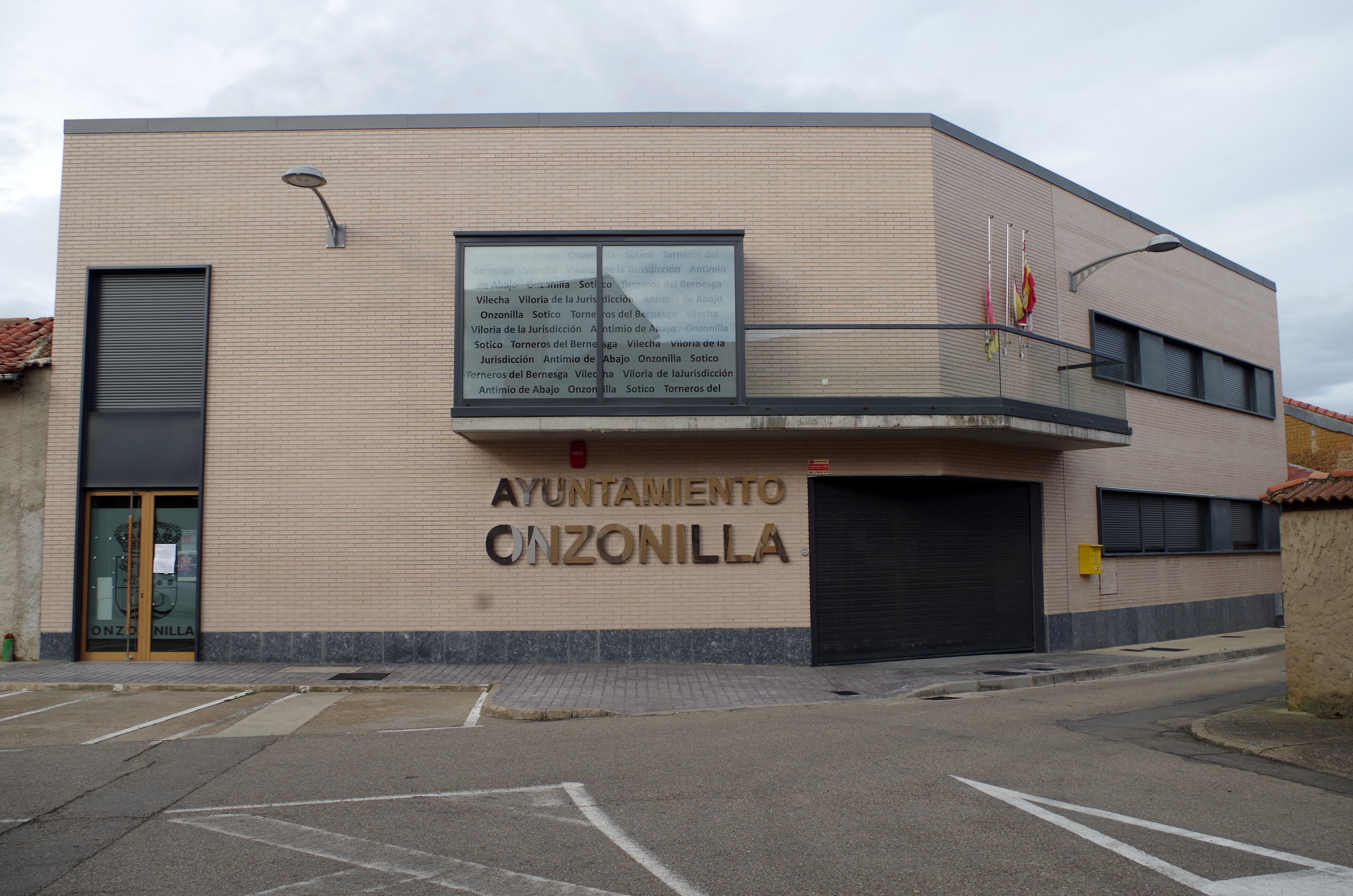
- Town hall of Onzonilla

- Flag Coat of arms
- Interactive map of Onzonilla, Spain
- Country: Spain
- Autonomous community: Castile and León
- Province: León
- Municipality: Onzonilla

Area
  - Total: 21 km^{2} (8.1 sq mi)

Population (2025-01-01)
  - Total: 1,974
  - Density: 94/km^{2} (240/sq mi)
- Time zone: UTC+1 (CET)
  - Summer (DST): UTC+2 (CEST)

Onzonilla is a municipality located in the province of León, Castile and León, Spain. At the 2011 census (INE), the municipality had a population of 1,761 inhabitants.
