= Valverde de la Virgen =

Coordinates: 42°34′N 5°41′W

- municipality
- Coat of arms
- Interactive map of Valverde de la Virgen
- Country: Spain
- Autonomous community: Castile and León
- Province: León
- Municipality: Valverde de la Virgen

Area
  - Total: 64 km^{2} (25 sq mi)
- Elevation: 838 m (2,749 ft)

Population (2025-01-01)
  - Total: 7,936
  - Density: 120/km^{2} (320/sq mi)
- Time zone: UTC+1 (CET)
  - Summer (DST): UTC+2 (CEST)

Valverde de la Virgen is a municipality located in the province of León, Castile and León, Spain. According to the 2006 census (INE), the municipality has a population of 5,034 inhabitants.
