= Santovenia de la Valdoncina =

Santovenia de la Valdoncina, Spain
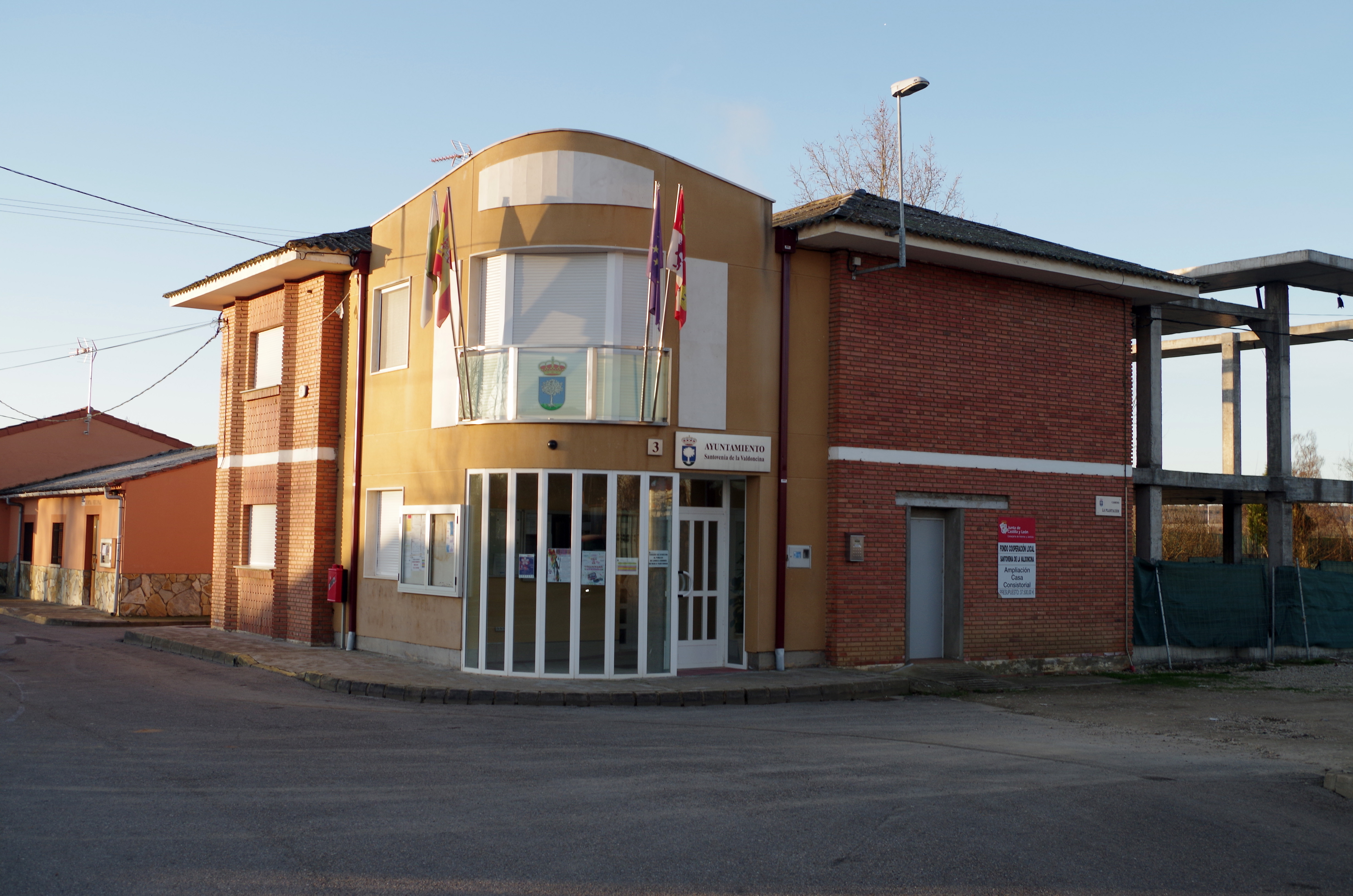

- Flag Coat of arms

- Location in Spain
- Coordinates: 42.55°N 5.6167°W
- Country: Spain
- Autonomous community: Castile and León
- Province: León
- Municipality: Santovenia de la Valdoncina

Area
  - Total: 30 km^{2} (12 sq mi)
- Elevation: 836 m (2,743 ft)

Population (2025-01-01)
  - Total: 2,058
  - Density: 69/km^{2} (180/sq mi)
- Time zone: UTC+1 (CET)
  - Summer (DST): UTC+2 (CEST)

Santovenia de la Valdoncina (Spanish pronunciation: [santoˈβenja ðe la βaldonˈθina]) is a municipality located in the province of León, Castile and León, Spain. According to the 2004 census (INE), the municipality has a population of 1,774 inhabitants.

== Towns ==
Quintana de Raneros; Ribaseca; Santovenia de la Valdoncina; Villacedré; Villanueva del Carnero
