= Sariegos =

Coordinates: 42°39′N 5°38′W

Sariegos, Spain
- municipality
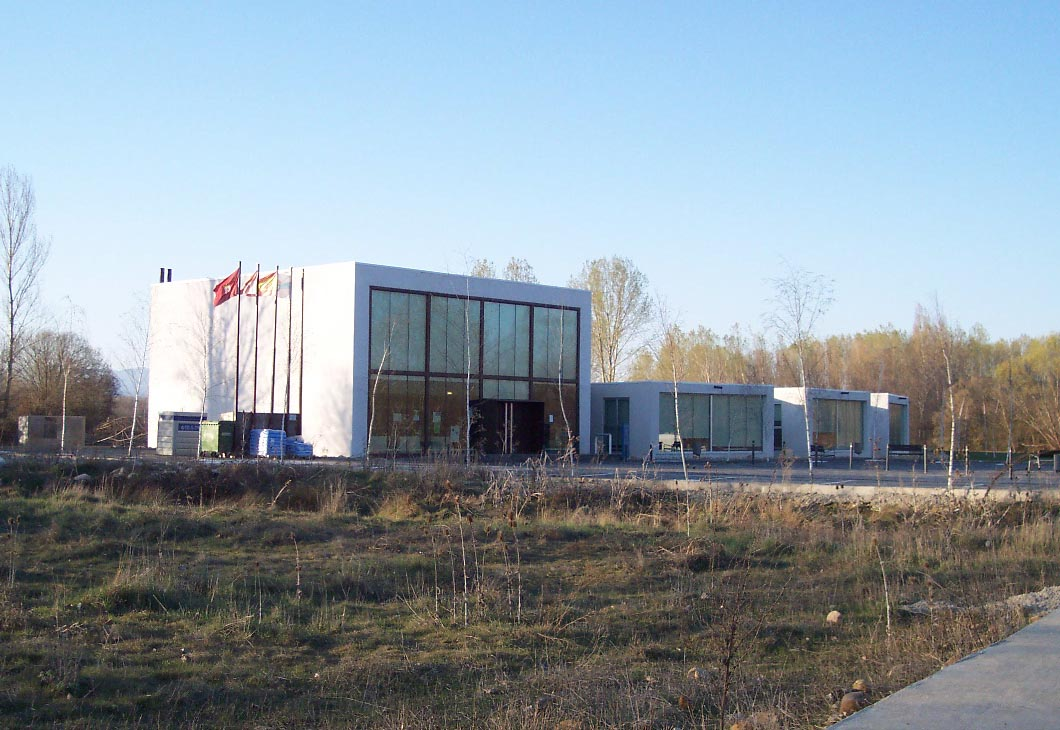
- Town hall of Sariegos

- Flag Coat of arms
- Interactive map of Sariegos, Spain
- Country: Spain
- Autonomous community: Castile and León
- Province: León
- Municipality: Sariegos

Area
  - Total: 36 km^{2} (14 sq mi)

Population (2025-01-01)
  - Total: 5,456
  - Density: 150/km^{2} (390/sq mi)
- Time zone: UTC+1 (CET)
  - Summer (DST): UTC+2 (CEST)

Sariegos is a municipality located in the province of León, Castile and León, Spain. According to the 2004 census (INE), the municipality has a population of 3,451 inhabitants.
