= Church of Santa María Magdalena (Matapozuelos) =

Church in Matapozuelos, Spain

Coordinates: 41.4114°N 4.7902°W

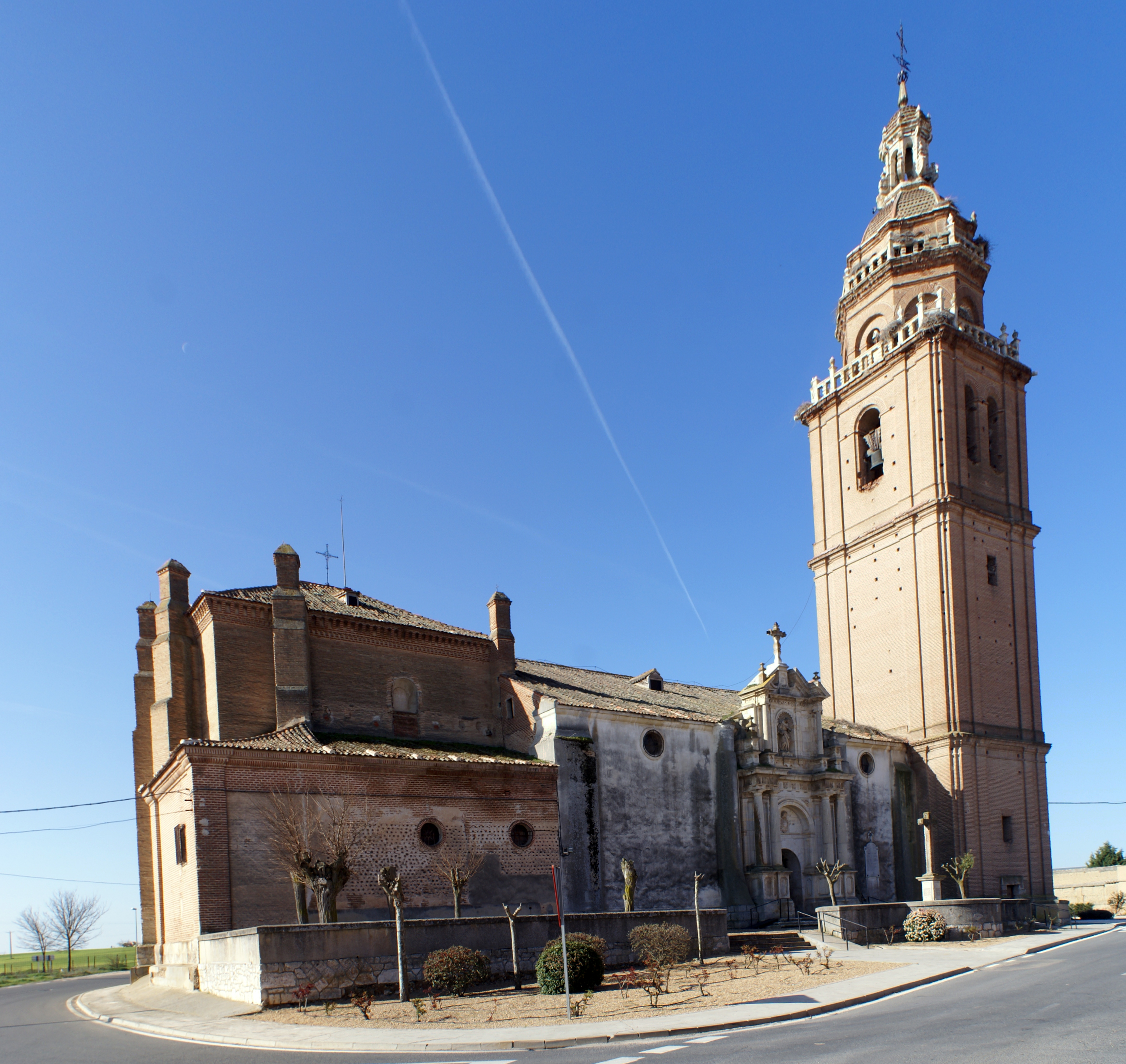
- Church of Santa María Magdalena
- Location: Matapozuelos
- Country: Spain
- Denomination: Catholic Church

History
- Dedication: Saint Mary Magdalene

Architecture
- Style: Renaissance (also incorporates Gothic and Baroque elements)
- Years built: 16th, 17th, and 18th centuries

Administration
- Diocese: Valladolid

The Church of Santa María Magdalena is a Catholic church located in the Spanish town of Matapozuelos, in the Province of Valladolid, within the autonomous community of Castile and León. It stands as one of the most significant examples of 16th-century architecture in the province. The church dominates the town's historic center with its prominent tower, affectionately known locally as "La Giralda de Castilla" (The Giralda of Castile), evoking comparisons to the tower in Seville.

Positioned on a hill within the town center, the church has undergone numerous renovations over the centuries, which have partially altered its original structure, resulting in a monument of distinctive character. Its interior houses one of the finest examples of late Gothic architecture in the province, particularly in the vault covering the presbytery. The church also preserves a rich collection of sculptural and pictorial works in its altarpieces. These qualities led to its designation as a Bien de Interés Cultural ('Asset of Cultural Interest') in 1998.

== Historical context ==
Evidence of human settlement in the Matapozuelos area dates back to prehistoric times. A notable site is the estate known as "Pico," where the Adaja and Eresma rivers converge, approximately 5 km northeast of Matapozuelos' town center. Today, the Hermitage of the Virgin of Sieteiglesias stands there. Archaeological finds in this area include Celtic and Roman remains, confirming the presence of a Roman mansio named Nivaria. A Roman bridge over the Adaja, part of the route between Valdestillas and Hornillos de Eresma, is still standing.

Following the Muslim conquest of the Iberian Peninsula, the region now known as Tierra de Medina saw the settlement of Berber groups engaged in sheep farming. Evidence of Muslim presence in Matapozuelos is found in the southern outskirts at the site called "Aladín," centered around the dovecote of Doña Vicenta.

The name Matapozuelos appears in historical records as early as the 13th century, mentioned in the Chronicle of Rodrigo Jiménez de Rada in connection with the Battle of Las Navas de Tolosa. At that time, the town, like others in the region, was a small settlement clustered around a Romanesque church.

The size of a church often reflects a town's wealth and status, prompting many communities in the Castilian plateau, including Matapozuelos, to demolish or extensively renovate their churches starting in the 16th century. These reconstructions, primarily in the Baroque style, continued through the 17th and 18th centuries. In Matapozuelos, construction of the new church began in the early 16th century and was not completed until the mid-18th century, as evidenced by the inscription on the Baroque façade: "Year 1767."

The sociocultural and economic conditions in Castile during the church's construction, particularly at the start of the 17th century, were marked by significant demographic decline, leading to the abandonment of many villages and population loss in surviving ones. Combined with the general economic crisis, this explains the interruptions in the church's renovation during the first half of that century.

== History ==
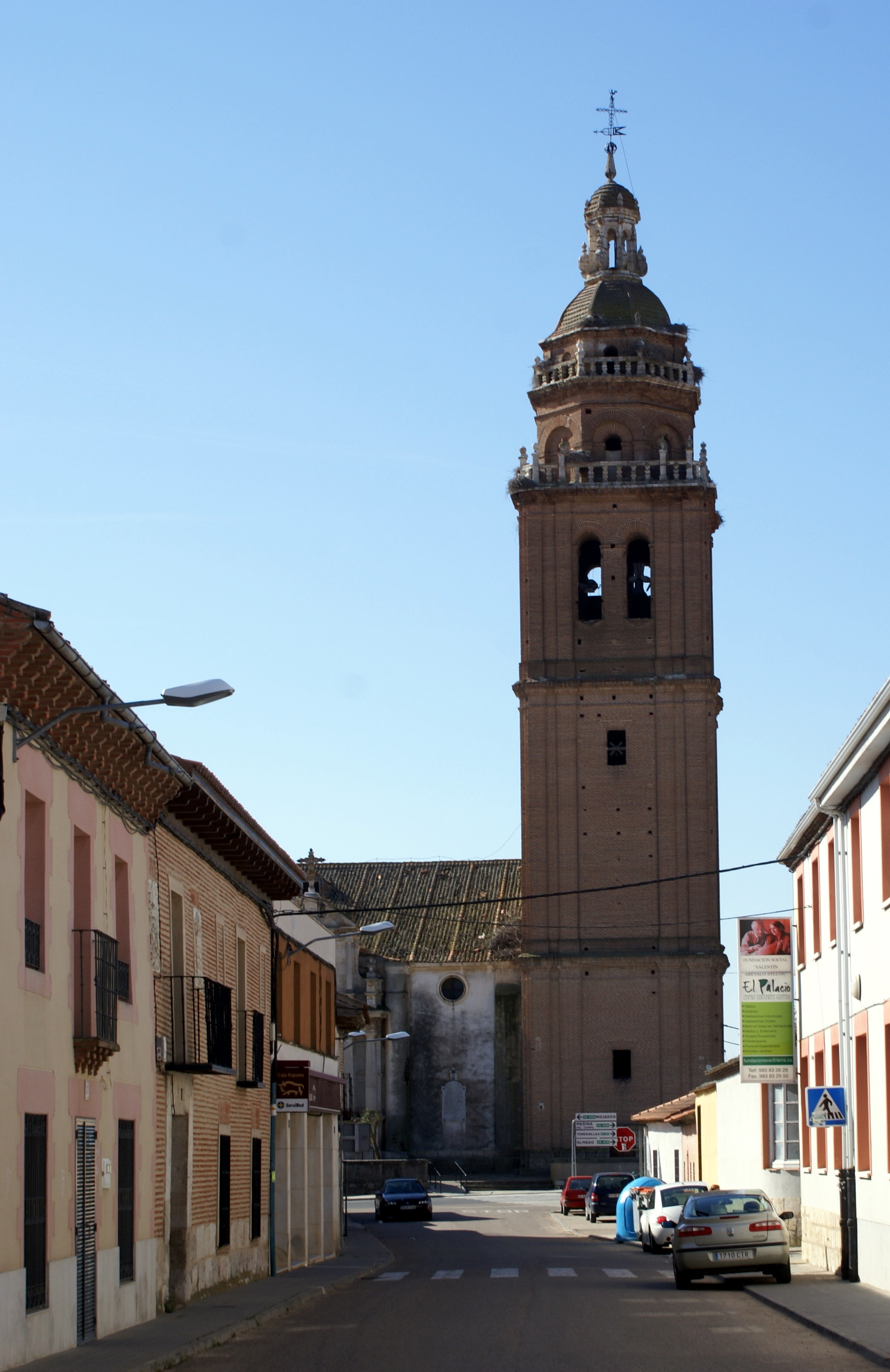
View from a street in the town

The Church of Santa María Magdalena is the only place of worship in the pine-forested town of Matapozuelos. It occupies a prominent position on a hill at the southern edge of the town center, at the intersection of roads connecting Medina del Campo to Mojados and Matapozuelos to Olmedo, which form a roundabout encircling the building.

The oldest part of the church is the chancel, a rectangular structure begun in 1544 under the direction of Diego de Segovia. By 1556, construction had stalled, with the vaulting and roofing still incomplete. The vault of the chancel bears a striking resemblance to that of the Church of San Juan Bautista in Santovenia de Pisuerga, designed by Juan de Escalante. While no document confirms Escalante as the designer of Santa María Magdalena's plans, his presence in Matapozuelos in 1563 to oversee construction is recorded.

Work on the lateral naves began in 1567, led by Juan de la Vega, completing the enclosure of the church's sides and opening the so-called "Puerta del Sol" (Sun Gate). Carpenters Juan Gallegón and Pedro de Coca installed a temporary artesonado. Four years later, construction resumed with the building of an initial tower. In 1594, work continued under Francisco de la Maza, aiming to extend the church toward the then-freestanding tower. The structure was covered with wood, and a choir was built, but stability issues with the tower necessitated reinforcing its foundations with ashlar masonry and undertaking extensive repairs.

In the late first third of the 17th century, a partial renovation was proposed, focusing on replacing the wooden roofing of the lateral naves with barrel vaults. In 1652, Nicolás Bueno revised the project, highlighting the need to strengthen the interior columns to support the new vaults' weight. The work was completed two years later, approved by architects Mateo Martínez, Pedro Núñez, and Francisco Cillero. The total cost was 40,000 reales, with plaster decoration paid separately.

Upon completion of the vaulting, the tower's instability became evident. In 1659, an episcopal representative noted that its structure, riddled with cracks, could not support large bells without risking collapse. The representative ordered its demolition and reconstruction using salvaged materials, but this was not acted upon until 1671, when the diocese issued an ultimatum due to the imminent threat of collapse.

Demolition of the tower began, with efforts to preserve materials for the new structure. Construction started in 1681, with Manuel Cillero overseeing the foundation and Francisco de las Heras Cuervo managing the main body by 1683. The project took 27 years, leaving only the tower's covering, temporarily done in wood.

Nearly two decades passed before work on the tower's final stage began. When sufficient funds were available, the church commissioned Matías Machuca, a pivotal figure in the church's history. Machuca completed a double octagonal section with corridors and a lantern in just one year, finalizing the tower. From the outset, locals compared it to Seville's Giralda, as recorded in verses by Nicolás de Velasco Moraleja, a townsman, in the church's record book:

"...a most beautiful tower

which, once finished, will be a marvel,
more splendid than the Giralda of Seville."

1. Main altarpiece.; 2. Altar of Perpetual Help.; 3. Altarpiece of the Virgin of the Rosary.; 4. Altar of Saint Joseph.; 5. Altar of the Child Jesus.; 6. Altar of Saint Anthony of Padua.; 7. Altar of the Virgin of the O.; 8. Altar of the Sacred Heart of Mary.; 9. Altar of the Virgin of Carmel.; 10. Altarpiece of the Sorrowful Virgin.; 11. Altarpiece of the Immaculate Conception.; 12. Altar of Saint Mary Magdalene (dismantled).; A. New sacristy. B. South façade. C. Baptistery. D. Choir. E. Tower. F. Main façade, atrium, and transept. G. Old sacristy.

Machuca's involvement with the church continued. In 1731, he signed a contract for an expansion, but his proposal, which involved demolishing the side walls of the main chapel, was rejected. In 1742, the church turned to José Castander from Medina del Campo, who drafted plans to extend the choir and create a baptistery chapel, stating, "the extension of the choir and chapel for the baptismal font…with the corresponding vaults to be built on the existing stone foundations." This work connected the tower to the main structure. Further additions included a new sacristy on the Epistle side in 1754, built by Fray Antonio de Manzanares, and the main portal's inauguration in 1767, crafted entirely in stone by Andrés Añero.

In the early 20th century, a concrete atrium was built due to the construction of the Medina del Campo-Mojados road, requiring the relocation of the calvary near the portal. The atrium, made of mortar coated with concrete, remains largely unchanged today.

In 1979, efforts began to declare the church a Bien de Interés Cultural (BIC). The process culminated in 1998, when the University of Valladolid, in collaboration with the Real Academia de Bellas Artes de San Fernando, approved its designation as a BIC monument. On July 16, 1998, Decree 144/1998 granted the church and its immediate surroundings this status.

== Artistic description ==
The church exemplifies 16th-century Renaissance architecture, with 17th-century modifications, while incorporating Gothic structural solutions. Its 18th-century tower and portal are distinctly Baroque.

The primary construction material is brick, used in walls and vaults in a manner reminiscent of Mudéjar techniques. Stone appears in arches, supports, and the Baroque portal on the north façade.

In the Diccionario geográfico-estadístico-histórico de España y sus posesiones de Ultramar by Pascual Madoz, the church is described thus:

There is a parish church (Santa María Magdalena), a solid and well-built structure in the Roman style, notable for its Ionic-order main altar, the choir (located at ground level) with fine stalls, and the spacious sacristy. It boasts excellent ornaments and such a complete set of sacred vessels that it may be said to surpass or at least equal any temple in the region.

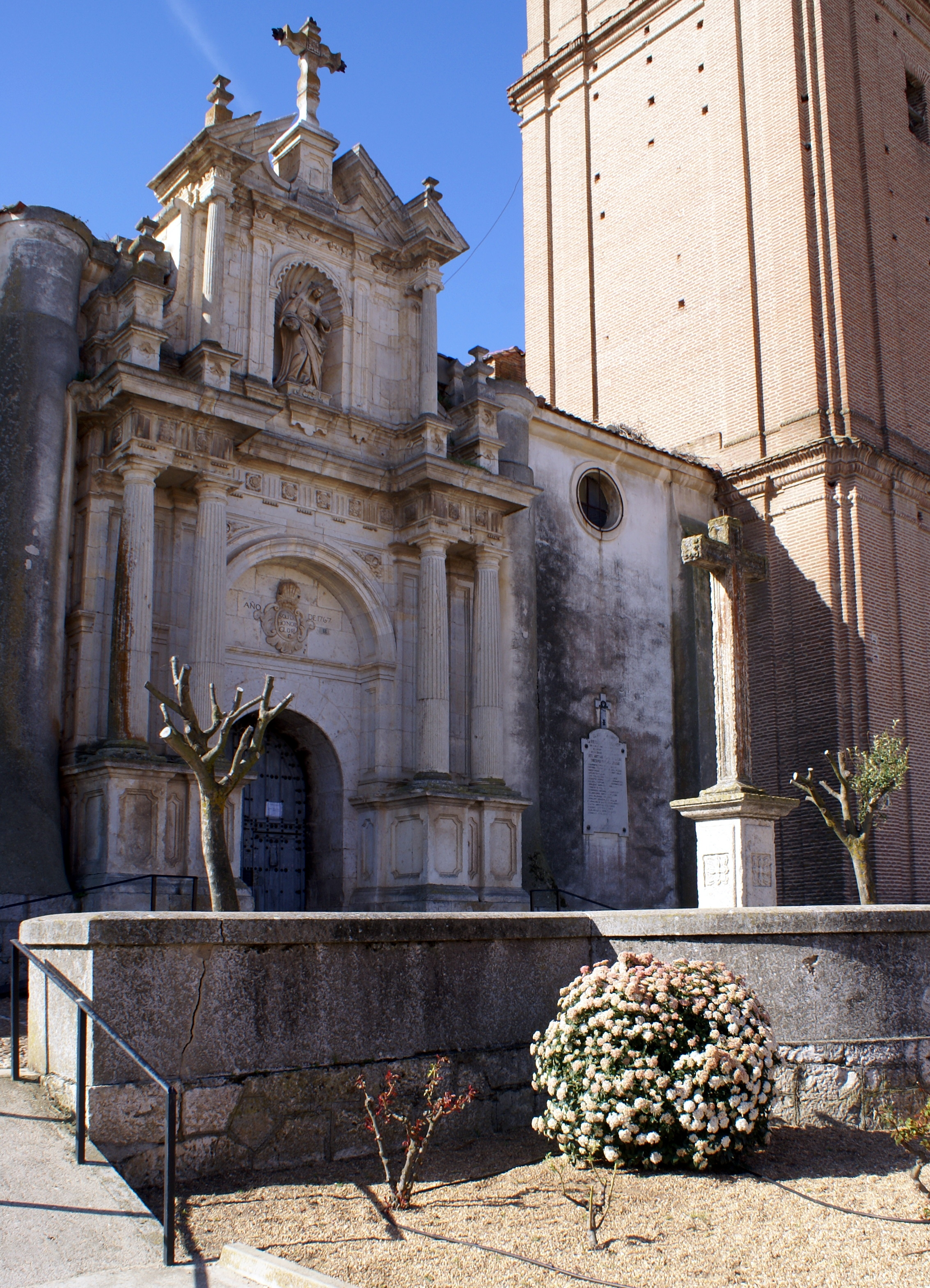
Main façade, concrete atrium, and calvary

=== Exterior ===
==== Main façade ====
The main façade, located on the north side, provides access from the Gospel side. Designed by Andrés Añero, it is built with ashlar from Campaspero, Santibáñez de Valcorba, Íscar, and Castrojimeno—nearby towns—in the Baroque style. The façade features a projecting central section flanked by double Doric columns with fluted shafts on large pedestals. The doorway, slightly recessed, is a semicircular arch with a lintel bearing the inscription soli deo honor et gloria (to God alone be honor and glory). Above, a frieze with metopes and triglyphs supports a narrower upper section featuring a niche framed by scalloped edges. This niche contains a stone statue of Saint Mary Magdalene, sculpted by Froilán Basurto. Flanking the niche are an attached pilaster and, at the edges, a freestanding Ionic column. Decorations elsewhere on the façade were crafted by Isidro Plaza. A cross crowns the central section. Completed in 1767, it marked the church's final construction phase.

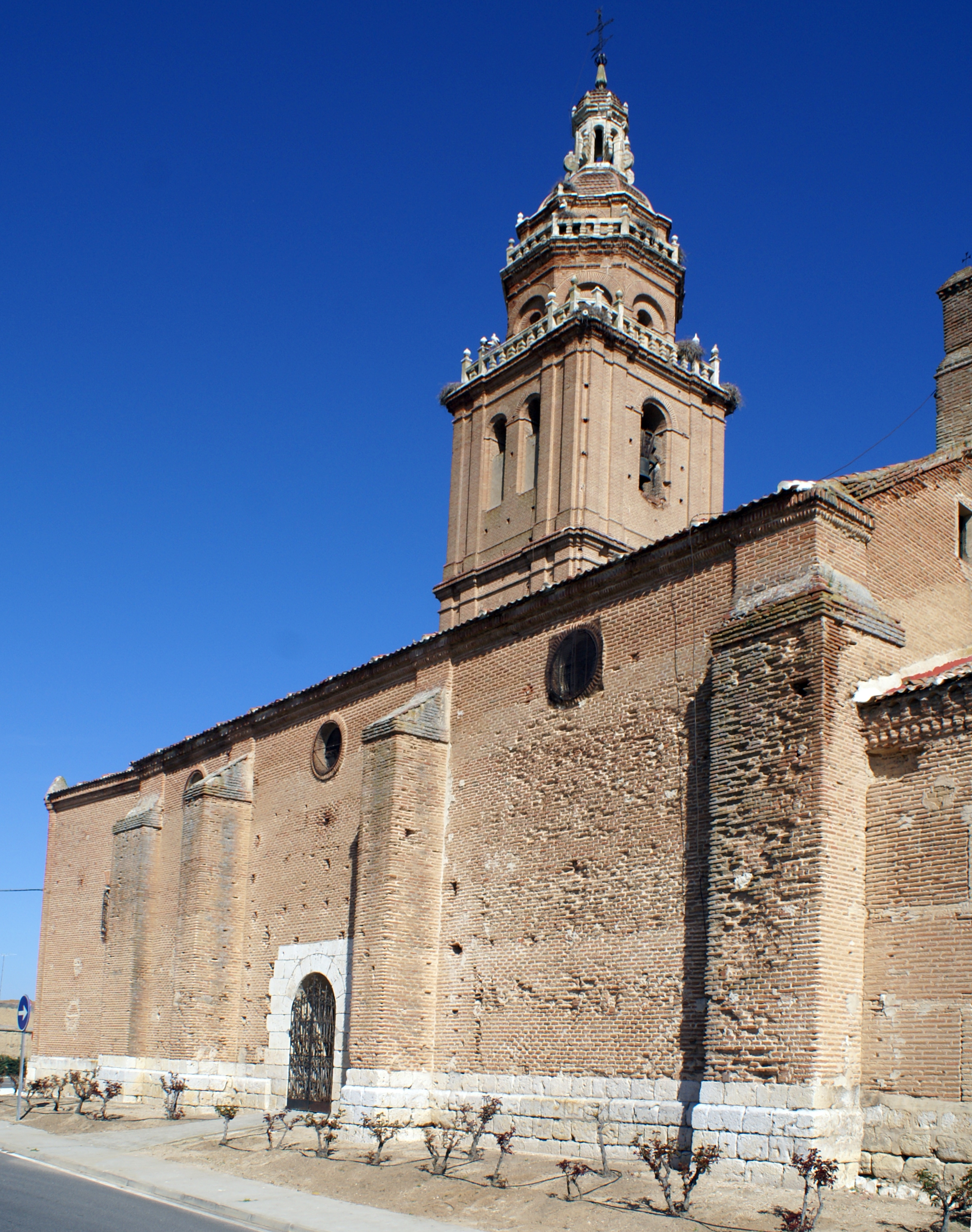
South façade

==== South façade ====
The south lateral façade features a base of rectangular Campaspero stone ashlar, with exposed brick above. Four buttresses reinforce the wall. Between the two central buttresses, aligned with the main entrance, is the Epistle-side door, a simple semicircular arch with voussoirs of the same stone as the base. Secured with an iron grate, this entrance is typically unused.

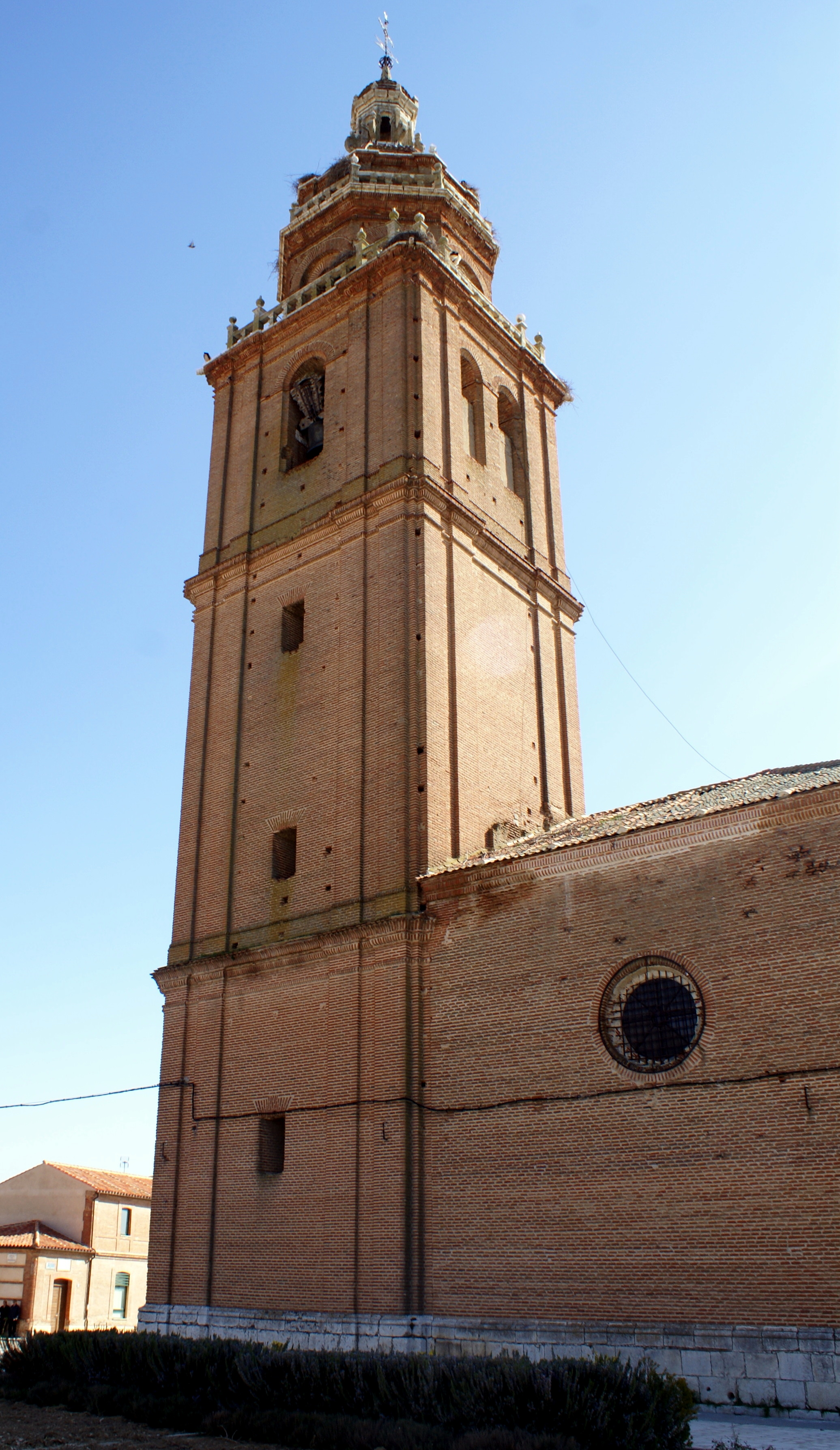
View of the tower from the church’s eastern end

==== Tower ====
Before the current 18th-century tower, an earlier one existed, mentioned in 1571. Positioned freestanding at the foot of the Epistle nave, it was reinforced with ashlar and its foundations strengthened around 1595 by Francisco de la Maza. Completed in 1602 by Toribio de la Cruz, this brick tower was topped with a spire.

The present tower, based on a square and built of brick, began under Francisco de las Heras, who constructed the first section on a stone plinth and proposed a slate spire typical of the period. The remaining two sections followed, and in 1723, Matías Machuca completed the tower with a stone and brick finial. Rising 62 meters, it is accessed via an external door on the Gospel side. Inside, it has two levels, a belfry reached by a spiral staircase, and a balustrade with a lantern. Above the midpoint, a window houses a rattle sounded from Maundy Thursday to Easter Sunday. García Chico, referencing Machuca's design, describes the finial:

First, there is a stone corridor with bulbous balusters and balls topped with points on the handrail. The octagonal section, also of finely laid brick, features a double arcade with precisely cut arches and a well-defined extrados marked by a row of bricks. Above is another corridor, octagonal, with similar features. It is capped by a wavy-profiled dome divided into sections, covered with scale-like bricks "laid in a dog-tooth pattern." This roofing forms a well-arranged pattern, alternating semicircular-pointed bricks with angular ones. The term "dog-tooth" means each row is placed over the joints of the one below. The lantern, pierced with eight windows and adorned with volutes, is topped with a brick-scaled "little orange," ending in a needle, perforated iron ball, and weather vane.

=== Interior ===
The chancel, the oldest part of the church, is rectangular. The presbytery is covered by a stellar ribbed vault, supported on squinches resting on columns. Its curved ribs form a cross with ogee sides around a central circle. The vault's keystones are richly decorated with vegetal motifs and volutes in the "a candelieri" style, adding a Renaissance touch. The late Gothic style of the chancel is considered among the finest examples in the Province of Valladolid. This vault belongs to the second phase of the construction of the main chapel, first by Diego de Segovia and later by Juan de Escalante, whose work mirrors that of the church of Santovenia de Pisuerga.

Beyond a pointed triumphal arch, the church's naves open into a hall plan, separated by Tuscan columns. The lateral naves feature semicircular windows—two on the Epistle side, one on the Gospel side—as the chancel lacks them. The semicircular arches defining the central nave were lower than the triumphal arch, prompting an episcopal visitor to order their height increased with bricks to match the main chapel.

The first two sections of the naves were initially covered with a light coffered ceiling. In 1650, Nicolás Bueno assessed reinforcements needed for the columns to support new vaulting, which Francisco Cillero installed in 1658. The central nave was given a barrel vault with lunettes, while the side naves were given a groin vault. Cillero agreed to decorate the plasterwork with designs he had used in the Church of the Agustinas Recoletas in Medina del Campo.

Flanking the main chapel are two sacristies. The original sacristy, partially covered by a barrel vault with lunettes and a groin vault, is adorned with Baroque plasterwork. The newer sacristy, in use since around 1754, is rectangular with a Spanish ceiling (artesonado).

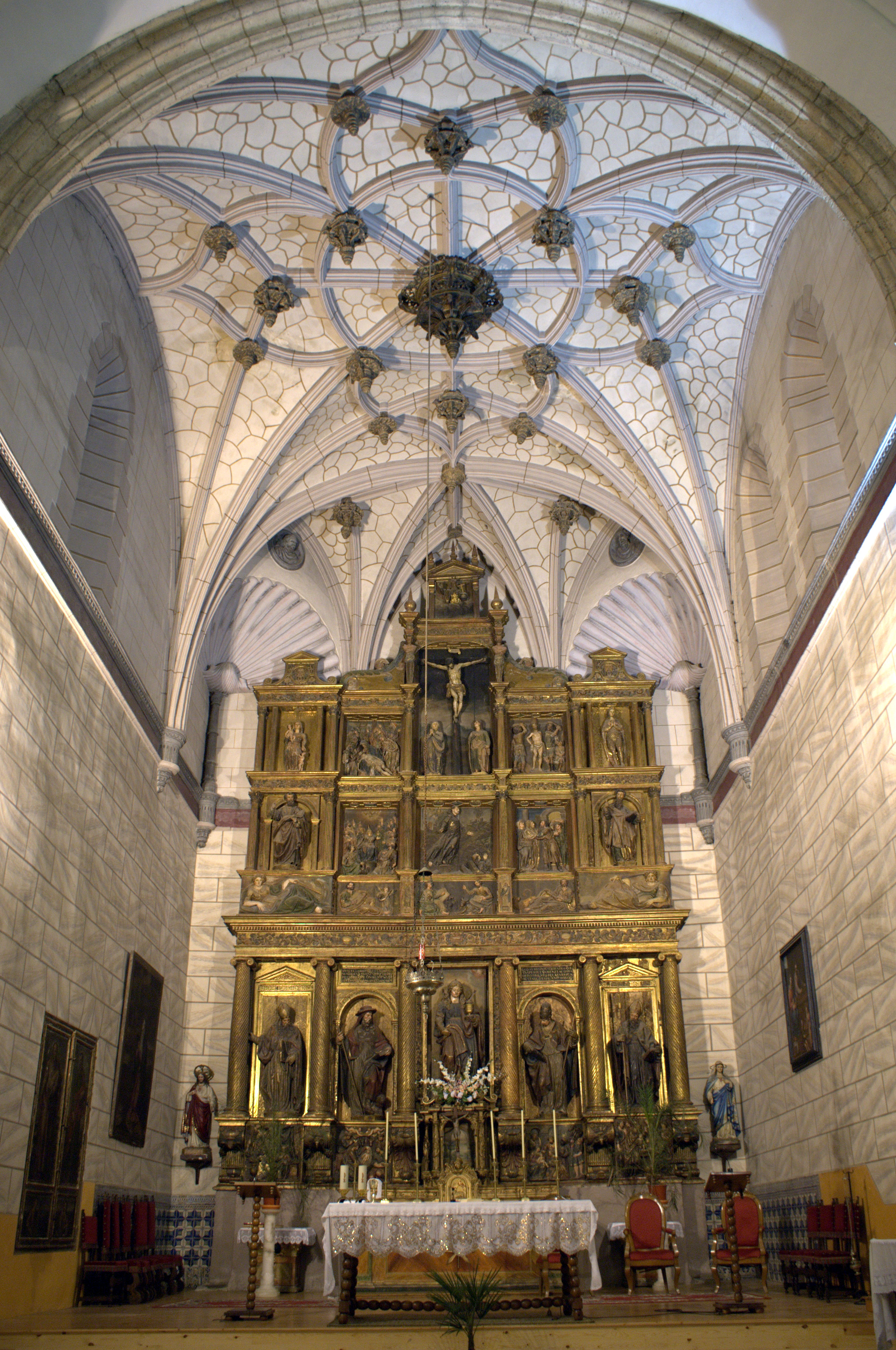
Main altarpiece and vault of the presbytery

==== Presbytery ====
- Main altarpiece: Crafted in gilded and polychromed wood, this altarpiece from the late 16th century features Baroque relief and freestanding sculptures. Donated by Ana Sanz, who bequeathed part of her fortune to the parish upon her death without heirs, it comprises a predella and three tiers with five sections defined by columns of varying orders. The predella, divided by ornate corbels supporting the upper columns, displays four historiated reliefs attributed to Adrián Álvarez or his workshop: the Annunciation, Adoration of the Shepherds, Epiphany, and Presentation, with the central section occupied by the tabernacle. The first tier, which is higher than the rest, is separated by Ionic order columns with a fluted shaft and capitals with spiral volutes; it features freestanding statues, with Saint Mary Magdalene, holding her attribute—a perfume jar—at the center, flanked by the four Doctors of the Church. A frieze above separates the second tier, with reliefs of Faith and Charity at the ends and the four Evangelists in the others, with Saints John and Luke sharing the central scene. This tier also includes statues of Saints Peter and Paul at the ends and reliefs of the Embrace at the Golden Gate and the Descent of the Holy Spirit. These sculptures are attributed to Pedro de la Cuadra. The third tier, from an earlier altarpiece, centers on the Calvary, elevated by columns topped with human-shaped estipites. It comprises the Crucified Christ, Virgin Mary, and Saint John the Evangelist, flanked by reliefs of the Pietà and the Flagellation, with two additional statues at the ends. The pediment is crowned with a relief of God the Father.
- Altar of Perpetual Help: A neo-Gothic altar with the images of Saint Roch in the center and a Beata and Saint Teresa on the sides.

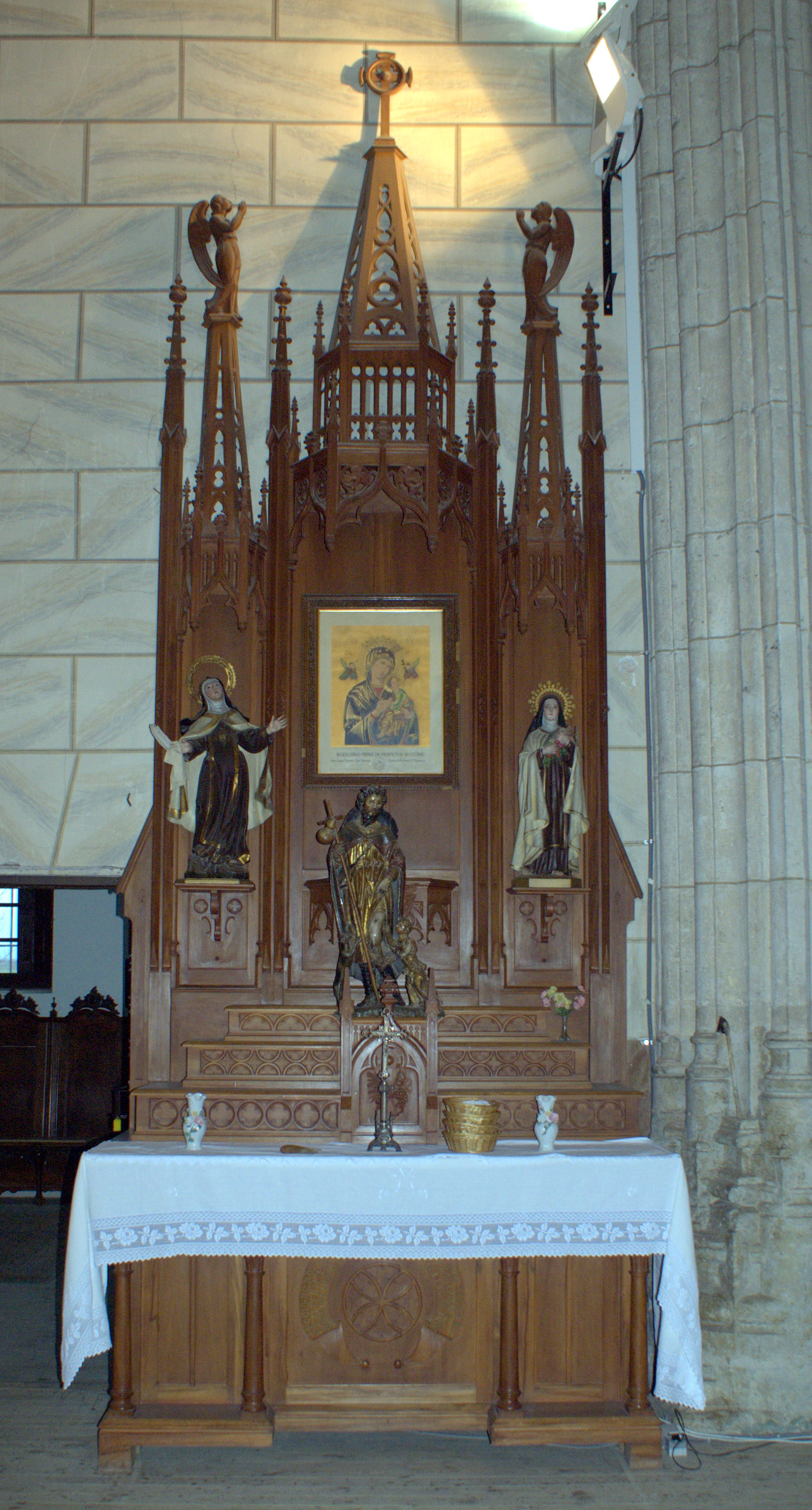
Altar of Perpetual Help

==== Gospel Side ====
On the Gospel side, there are two altars (Virgin of Carmel and Sacred Heart of Mary) and two altarpieces:

- Altarpiece of the Immaculate Conception: A Baroque piece from the early 18th century, donated by Andrés Inaraja, whose namesake Saint Andrew appears in the attic. It includes early 17th-century paintings of Saint Paul, Saint Anthony, a holy bishop, the Annunciation, and the Adoration of the Shepherds. The central figure is a plastered Immaculate Conception, though the original polychromed wood statue is now in the Diocesan and Cathedral Museum of Valladolid.
- Altarpiece of the Sorrowful Virgin: Divided into three parts, it centers on the Holy Christ, flanked by Saint John (right) and the Sorrowful Virgin (left), the latter donated by Juan Medina in the 18th century. The Rococo Holy Christ and Saint John were crafted by Pedro de la Cuadra following the donation.
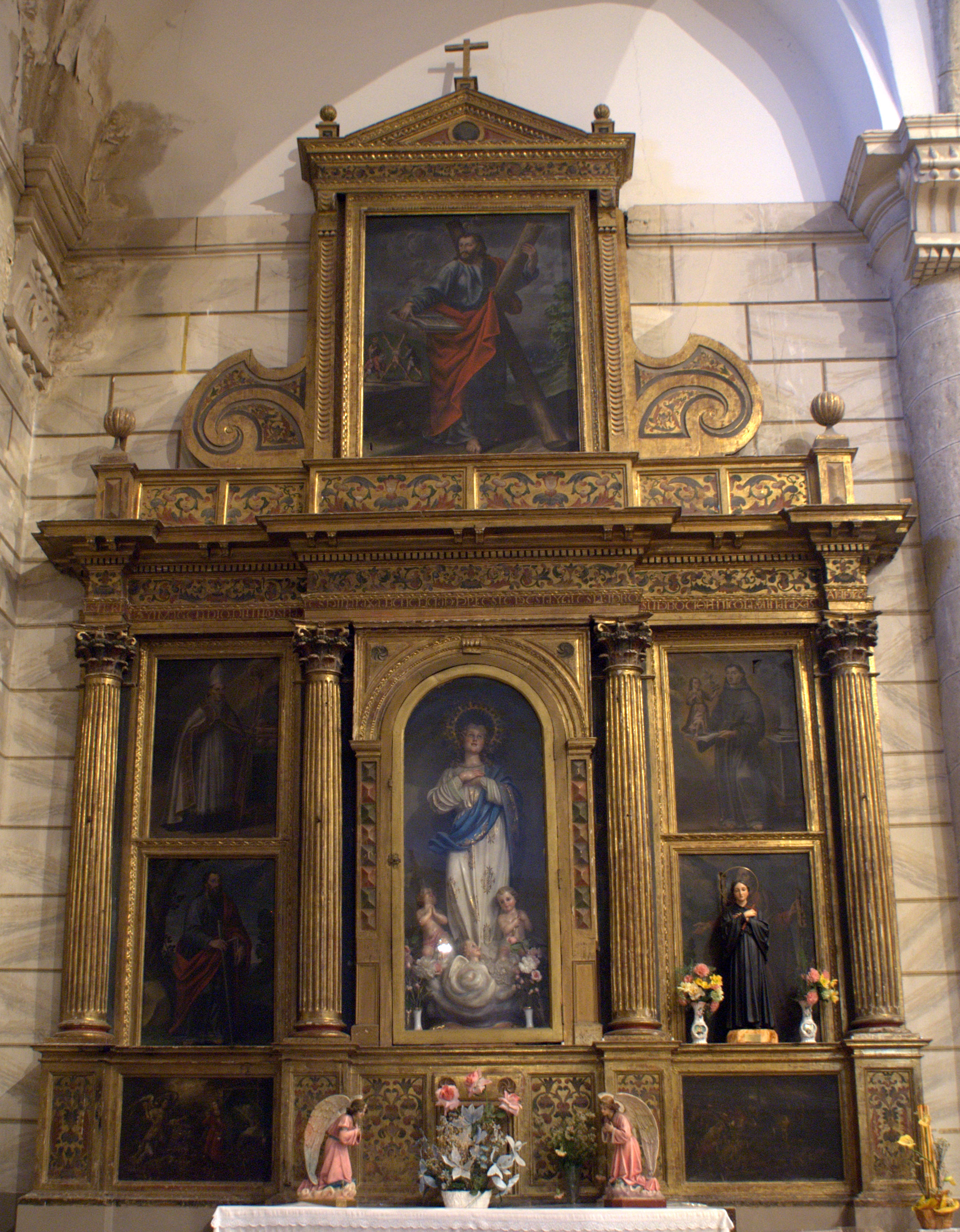
Altarpiece of the Immaculate Conception

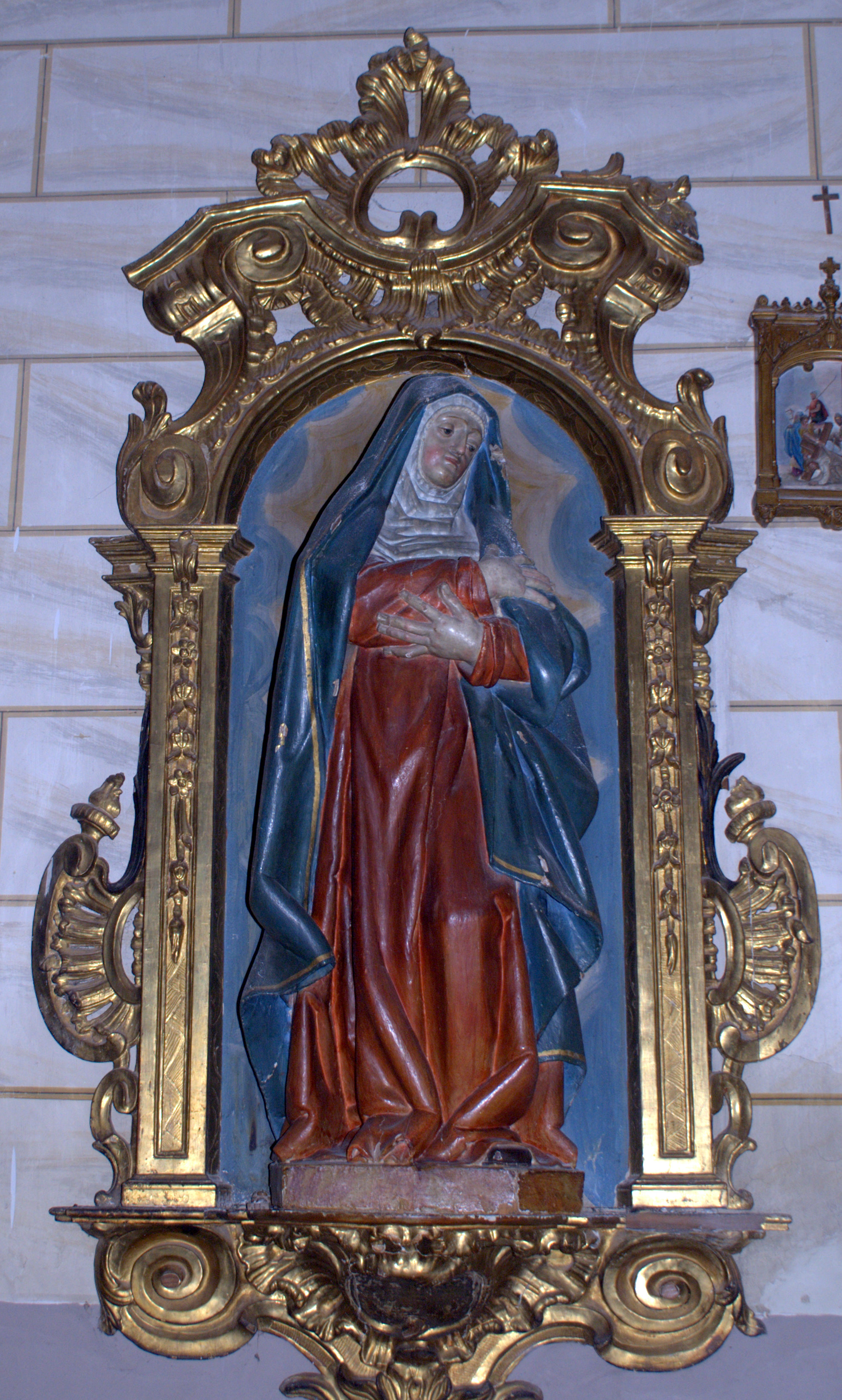
Virgin Mary of the Altarpiece of the Sorrowful Virgin

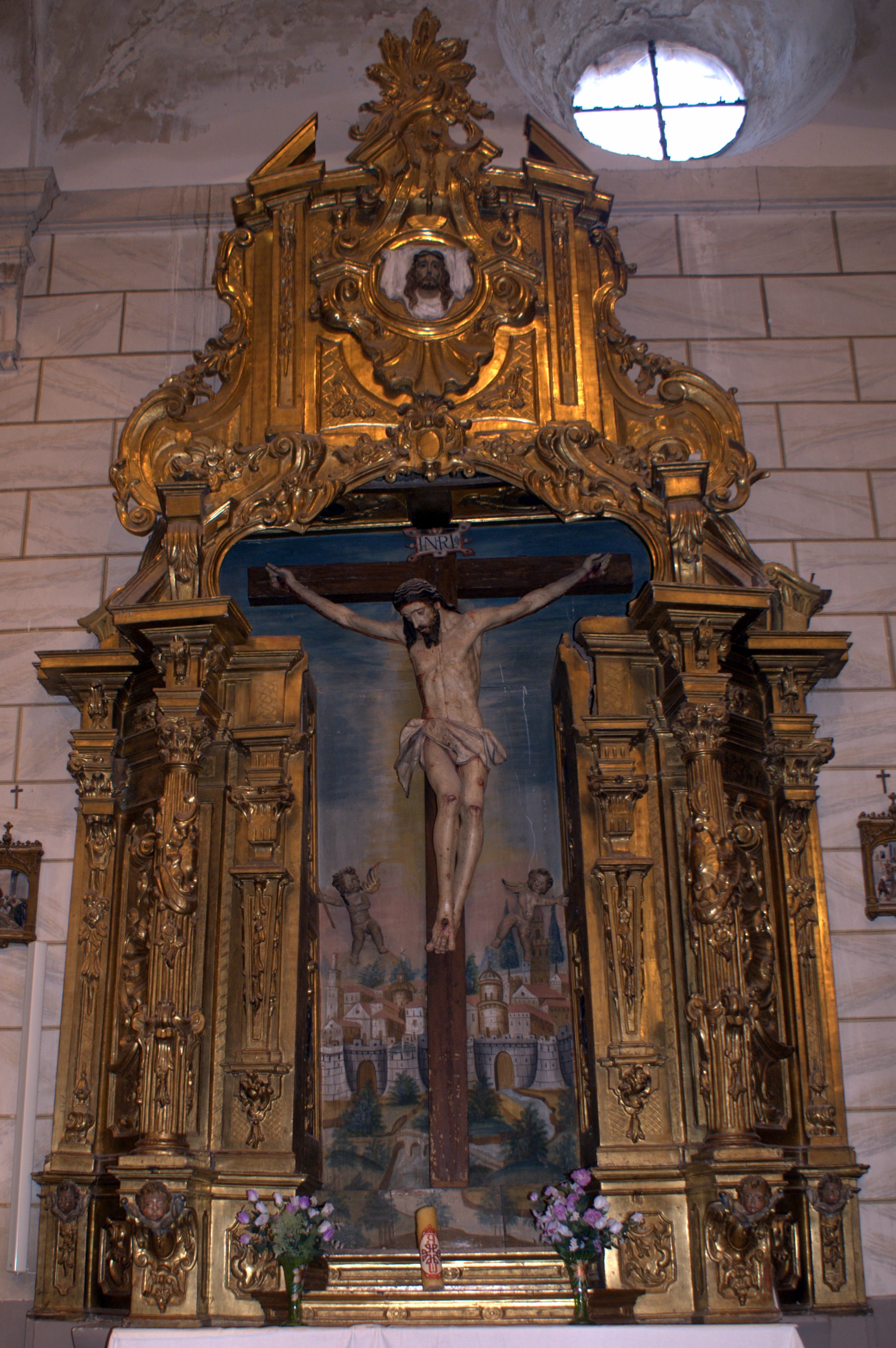
Christ of the Altarpiece of the Sorrowful Virgin

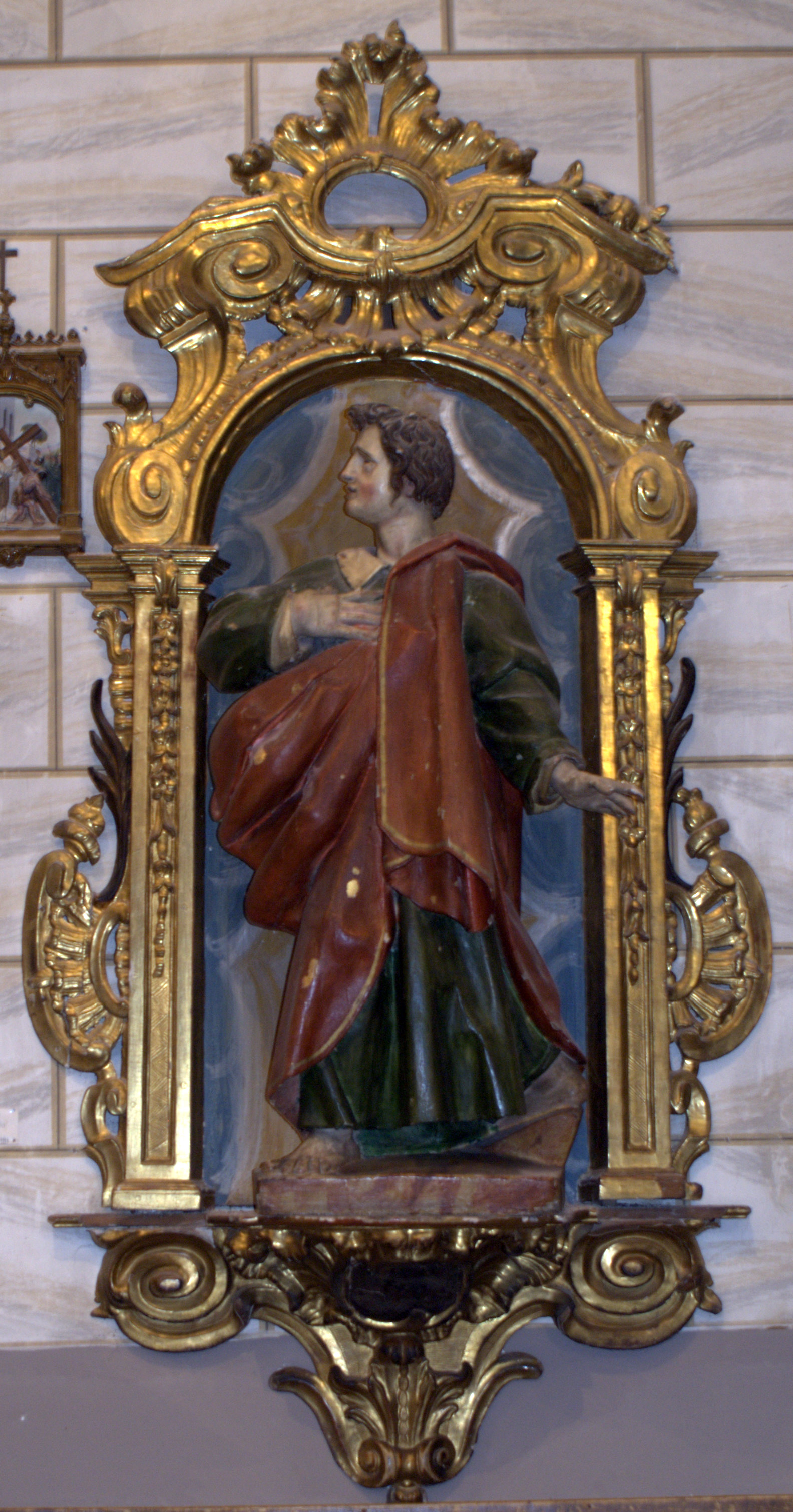
Saint John of the Altarpiece of the Sorrowful Virgin

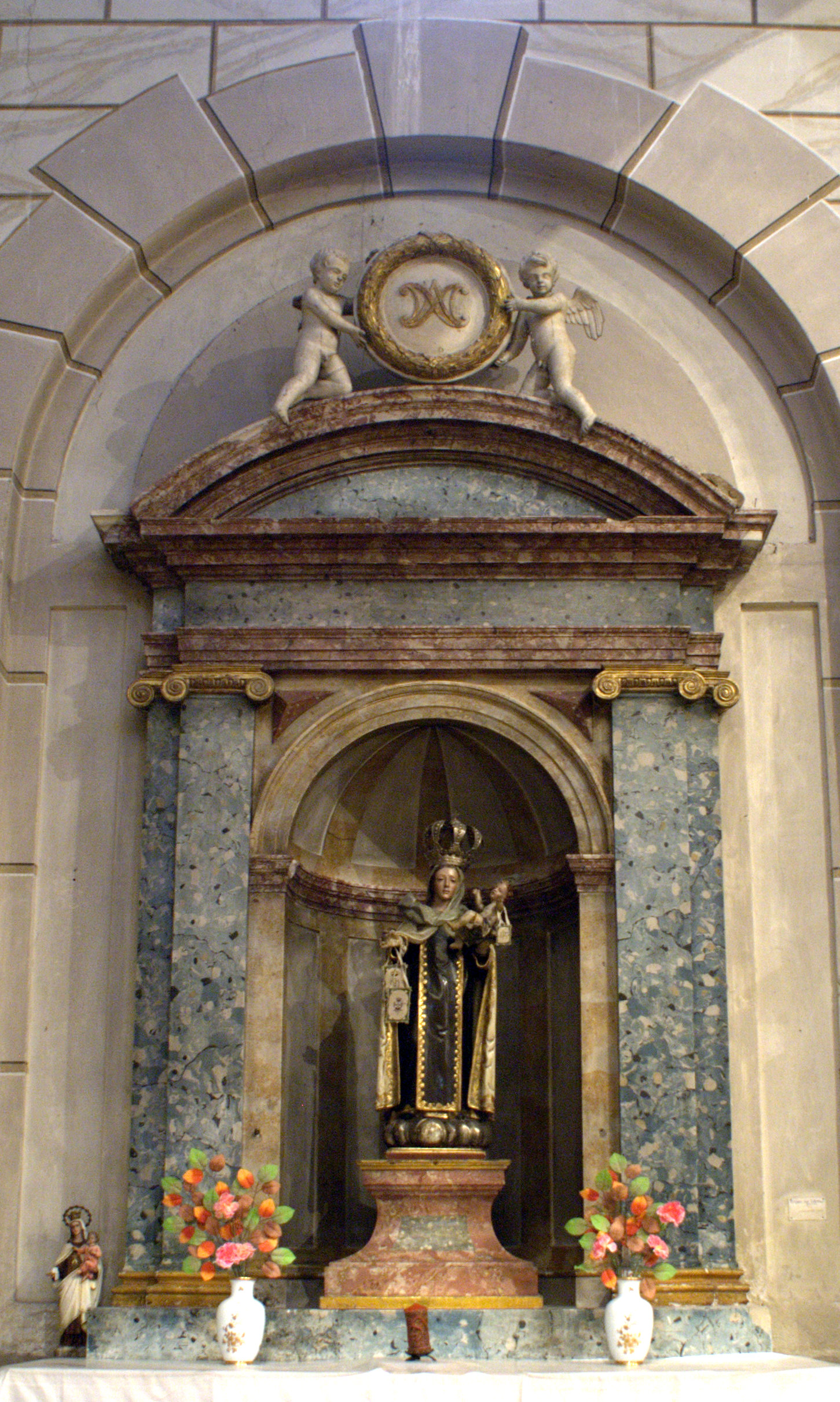
Altar of the Virgin of Carmel

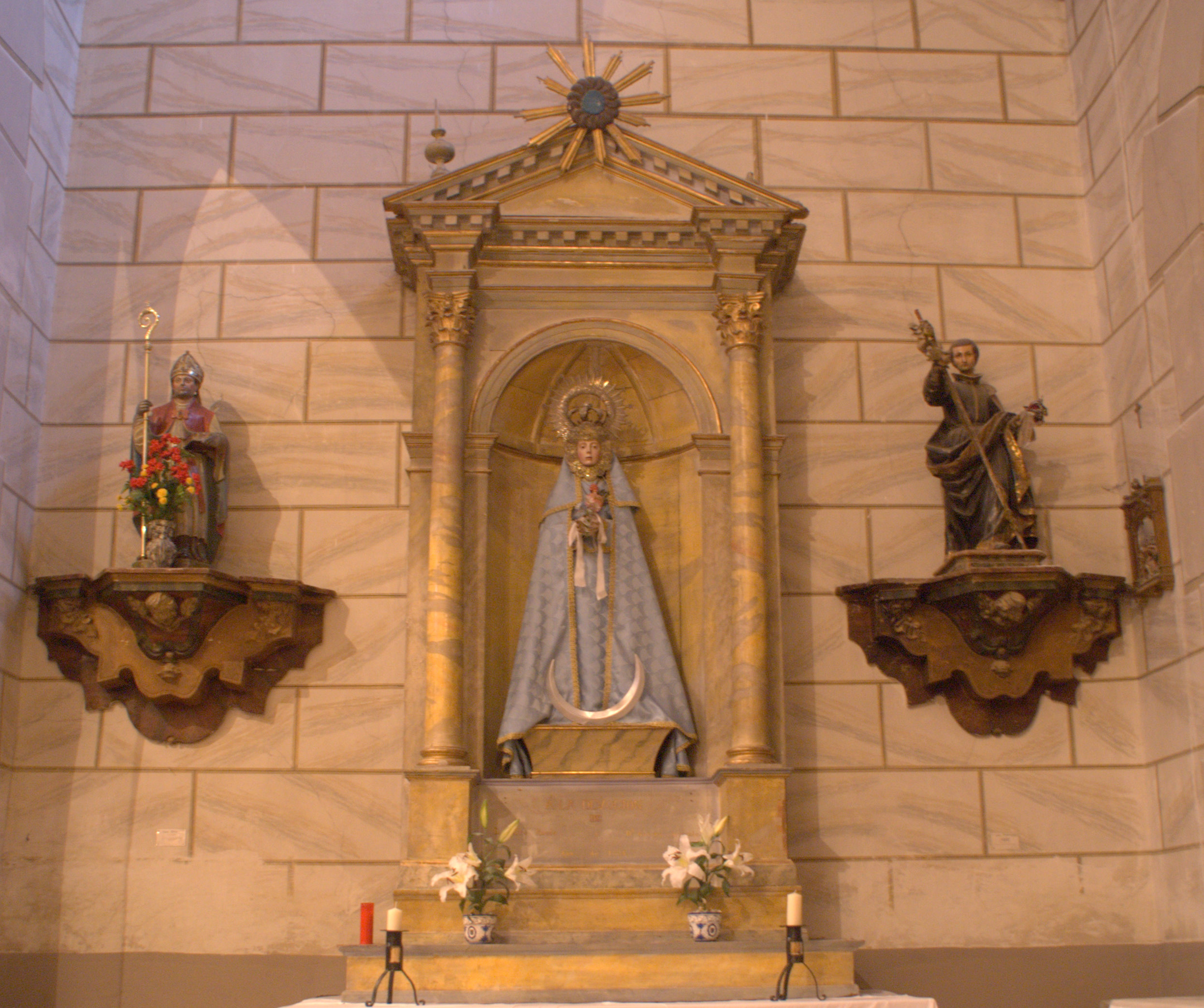
Altar of the Sacred Heart of Mary

==== Epistle side ====
On the Epistle side, there are five altarpieces:

- Altarpiece of the Virgin of the Rosary: A Baroque altarpiece from the mid-17th century, featuring a central Virgin of the Rosary with Child and a polychromed wooden Saint John the Baptist pointing to the Lamb of God at the top. It is adorned with six contemporary canvas paintings depicting the martyrdom of a Dominican saint and two female saints, Saint Francis before Christ, the Martyrdom of Saint Stephen, Saint Dominic in Soriano, and the Martyrdom of Saint Pelayo. The altarpiece, especially the Virgin of the Rosary, is tied to a 16th-century local confraternity and the Dominicans, who had a strong regional presence.
- Altar of Saint Joseph: Donated by Sotera Arévalo, it bears the inscription: "Doña Sotera Arévalo, fulfilling the wishes of her late husband Don Gregorio Velasco, erected this altar to Saint Joseph for curing her son Pancracio's illness. Year 1878."
- Altar of the Child Jesus: Centered on a wooden Child Jesus, possibly placed on the church's original tabernacle. It is decorated with seven early 17th-century paintings of Saint Christopher, Saint John the Baptist, Saint Joachim and the Virgin as a Child, Saint Apollonia (tooth), Saint Barbara (tower), Saint Agatha (breasts), and Saint Lucy (eyes).
- Altar of Saint Anthony of Padua: A plaster altar imitating marble, housing an 18th-century wooden statue of Saint Anthony of Padua.
- Altar of the Virgin of the O or Brazuelas: It is the figure of the Virgin, dressed according to the 18th century, above a plaster altarpiece imitating marble.
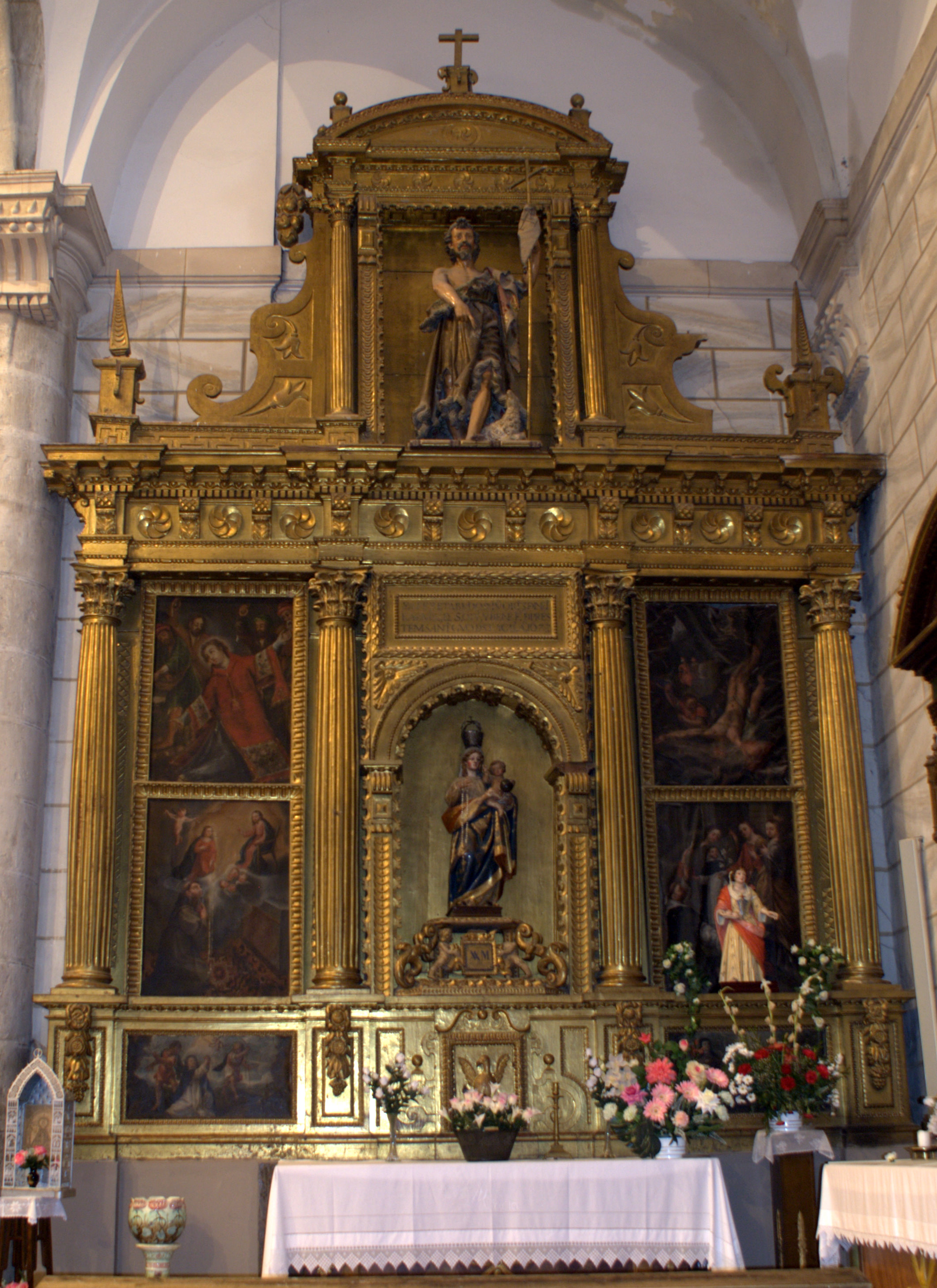
Altarpiece of the Virgin of the Rosary

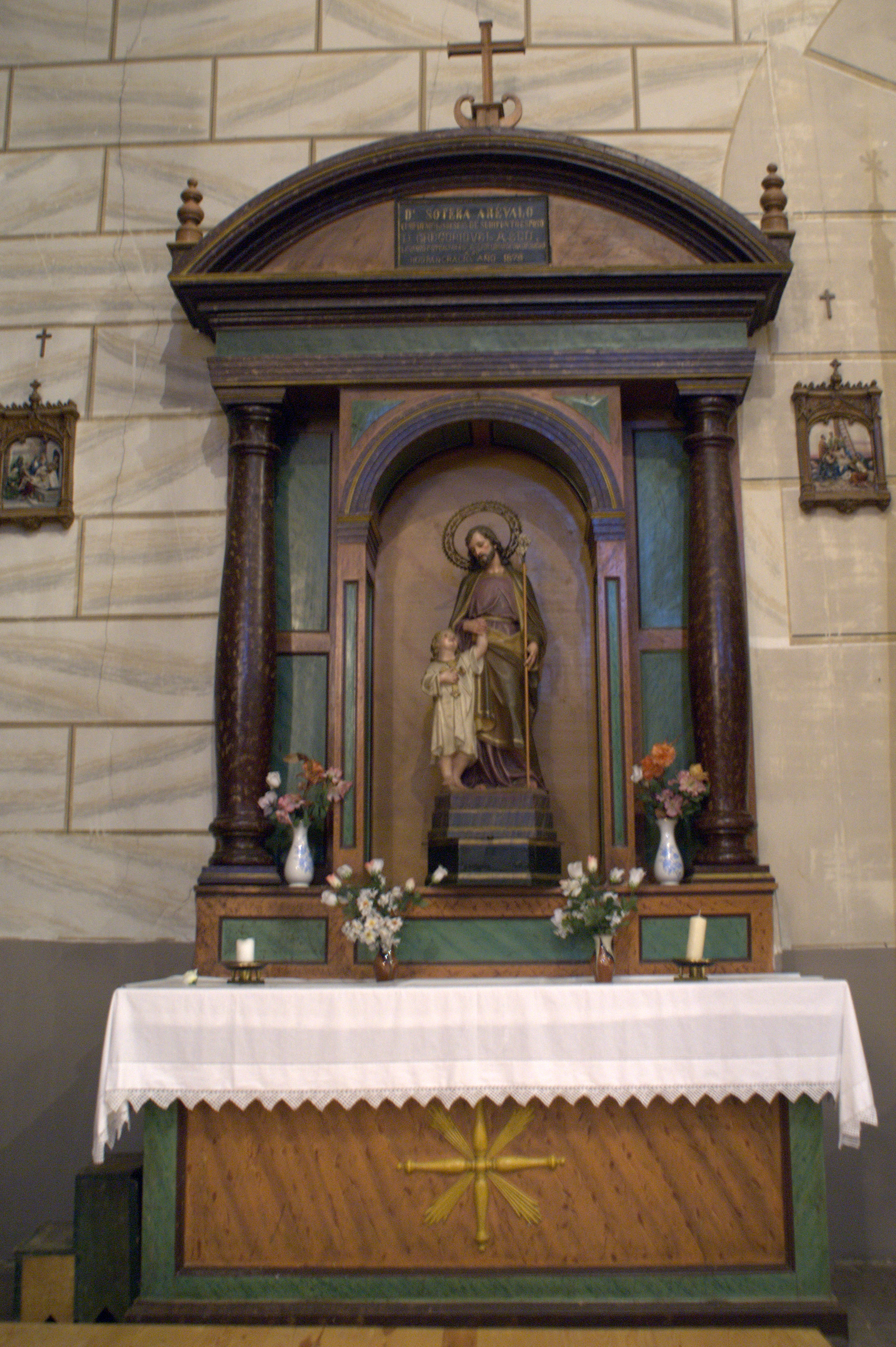
Altar of Saint Joseph

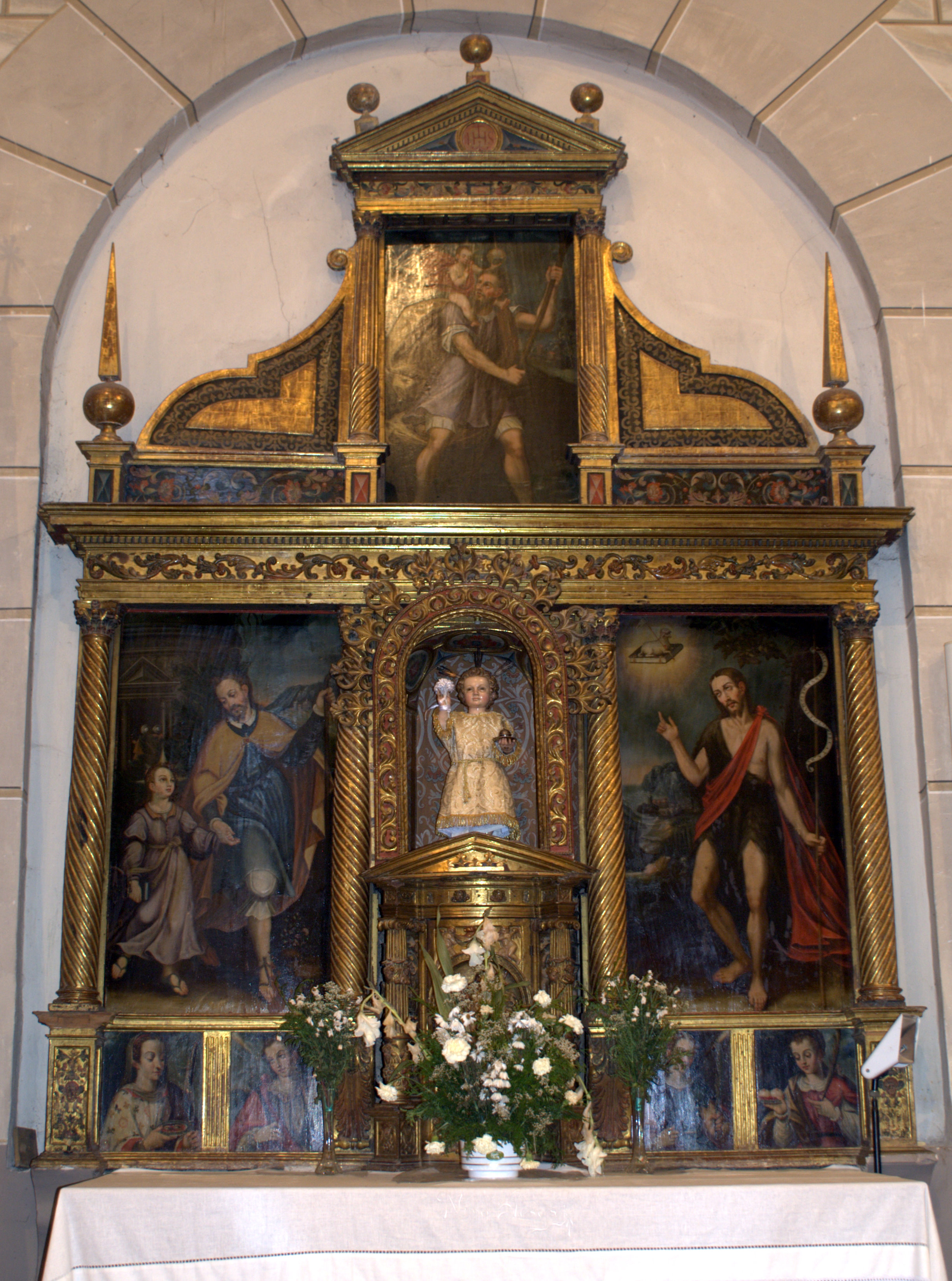
Altar of the Child Jesus

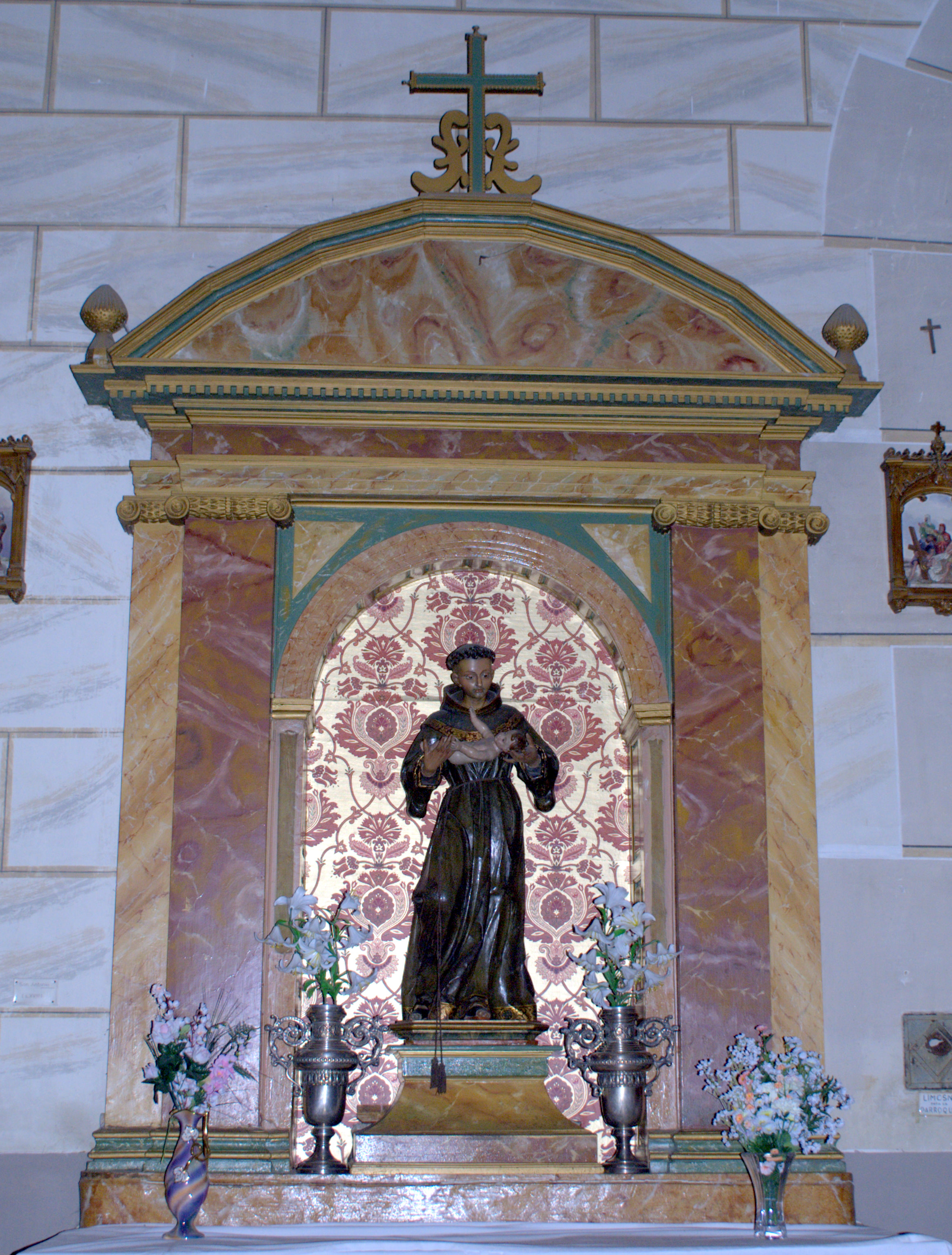
Altar of Saint Anthony of Padua

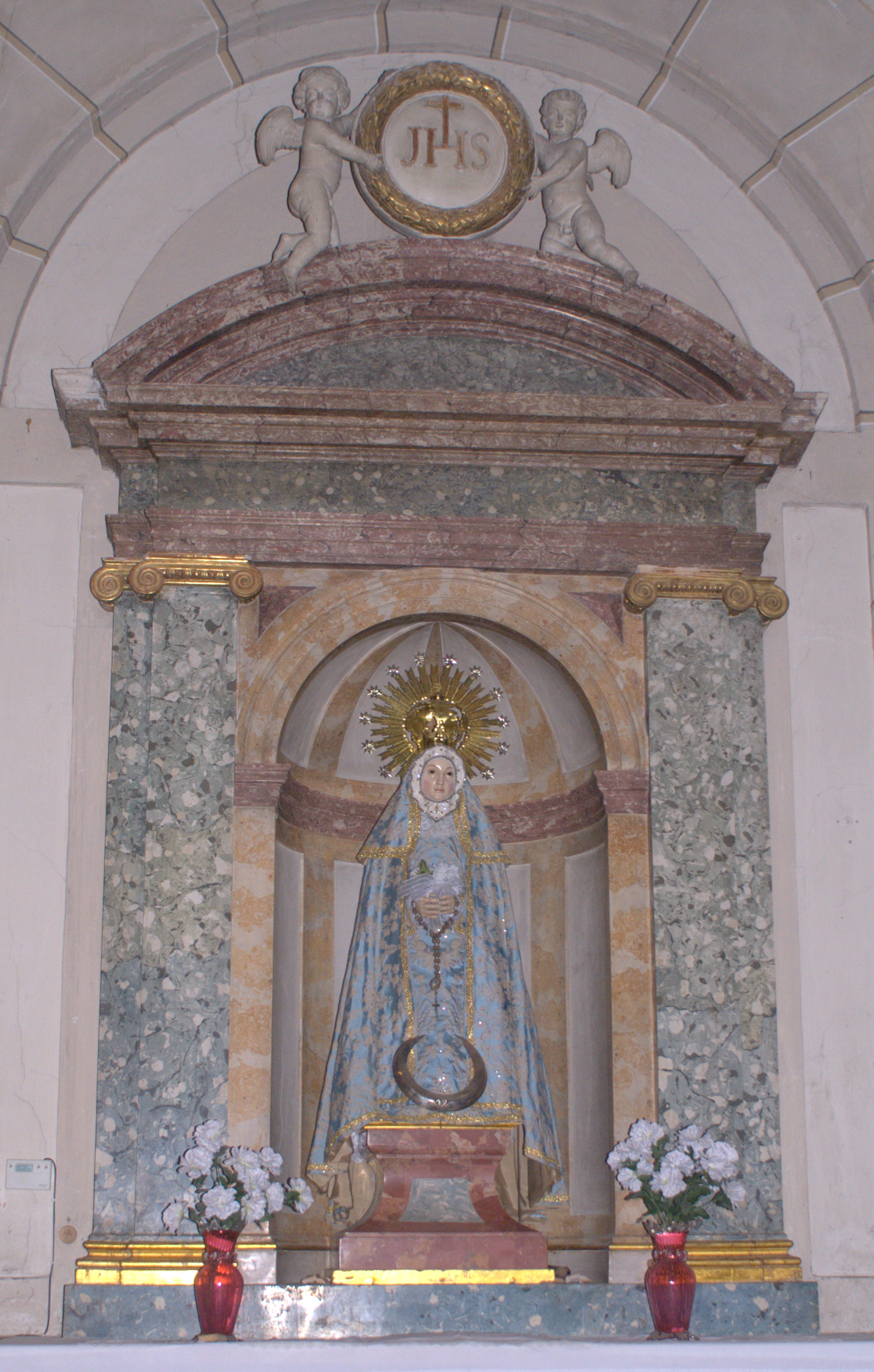
Altar of the Virgin of the O

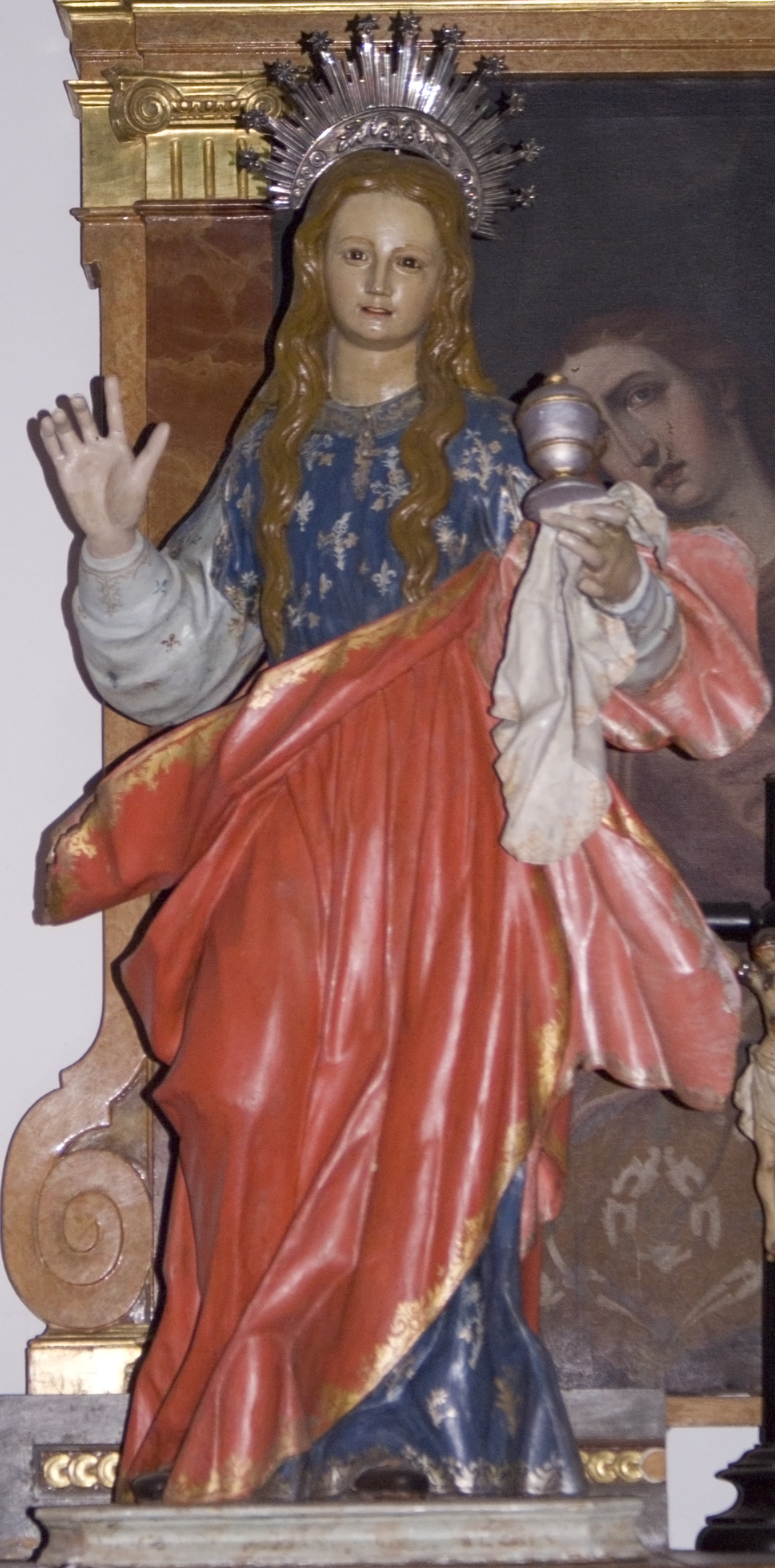
Statue of Saint Mary Magdalene in the new sacristy

==== Baptistery ====
The baptistery, on the Epistle side, is enclosed by a wrought-iron gate and features a polychromed wooden Crucified Christ from the early 17th century. It also houses small sculptures, including a Child Saint John the Baptist and a Santiago Matamoros on horseback. At its center is a stone baptismal font.

==== Sacristies ====
The church has two sacristies, one on each side, though only one is currently in use:

- Epistle Sacristy (New): The more recently built sacristy, now in use, contains a valuable chest of drawers and a polychromed wooden statue of Saint Mary Magdalene, crafted by the school of Pedro de Ávila.
- Gospel Sacristy (Old): The original sacristy, now divided into a chapel and oratory, serves as the parish's storage room. It retains a polychromed wooden Crucified Christ by Francisco de la Maza, a canvas painting of the Virgin with Child, and the Rococo altar of Saint Mary Magdalene, made in 1776 by Manuel Fernández de Navia, now in the new sacristy.

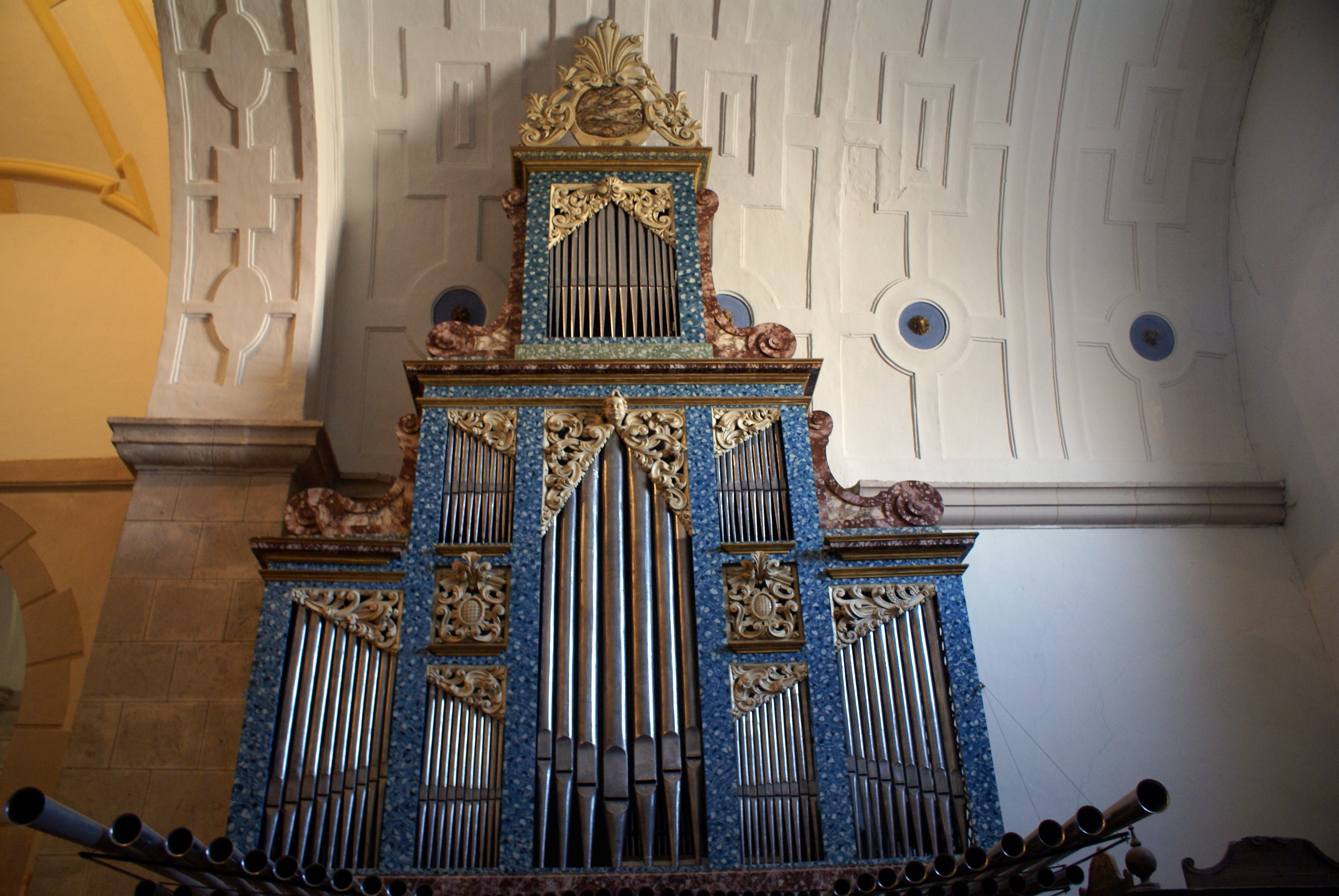
Baroque organ in the choir

==== Choir ====
The choir is located in the central nave, facing the main altar at ground level, separated by a wrought-iron grille. It preserves twelve choirbooks on parchment, some from the 17th century. The stalls, made of walnut, comprise nine seats, with carved faces on the misericords of three. The stalls bear the inscription "Soli Deo honor et gloria. Year 1780." A rotating wooden lectern is adorned with angel figures. On the Epistle side stands a Baroque organ with a neoclassical case from the late 18th century, well-preserved and restored in 2004.

== See also ==
- List of Bienes de Interés Cultural in the Province of Valladolid

== Bibliography ==
- Urrea, Jesús. El templo, la torre y el retablo de Matapozuelos (Valladolid) [The Temple, Tower, and Altarpiece of Matapozuelos (Valladolid)] (in Spanish). appendix to Catálogo Monumental de la provincia de Valladolid, by J.J. Martín González. Valladolid.
- Arévalo Arévalo, José Mª (1987). Matapozuelos, historia y arte [Matapozuelos, History and Art] (in Spanish). Valladolid: Editorial Sever-Cuesta. ISBN 84-398-9306-X.
- Madoz, Pascual (1848). Diccionario Geográfico-Estadístico-Histórico de España [Geographical-Statistical-Historical Dictionary of Spain] (in Spanish). Vol. 16. Valladolid -1984-: Editorial Ámbito.
- Heras, Felipe (1975). Arquitectura religiosa del siglo XVI en la primitiva diócesis de Valladolid [Religious Architecture of the 16th Century in the Original Diocese of Valladolid] (in Spanish). Diputación Provincial de Valladolid. ISBN 84-500-1233-3.
- Martín González, Juan José. Arquitectura barroca vallisoletana [Baroque Architecture of Valladolid] (in Spanish). Dep. Legal: VA 649-1967.
- Camina Cea, Juan Luis (1986–1989). Inventario de los bienes muebles e inmuebles de la parroquia de Santa María Magdalena [Inventory of the Movable and Immovable Assets of the Parish of Santa María Magdalena] (in Spanish). compiled by the local parish priest. Matapozuelos.
- Martín González, Juan José; Alonso-Pimentel y Pérez de los Cobos, María del Carmen; Ara Gil, Clementina Julia; Heras García, Felipe (1970). Inventario artístico de Valladolid y su provincia [Artistic Inventory of Valladolid and Its Province] (in Spanish). Valladolid. ISBN 84-00-03084-2.
- Fatás, Guillermo; Borrás, Gonzalo (1980). Diccionario de Términos de Arte [Dictionary of Art Terms] (in Spanish). Madrid: Alianza ed. del Prado. ISBN 84-7838-388-3.
