= Eresma River =

River in Spain

River Eresma
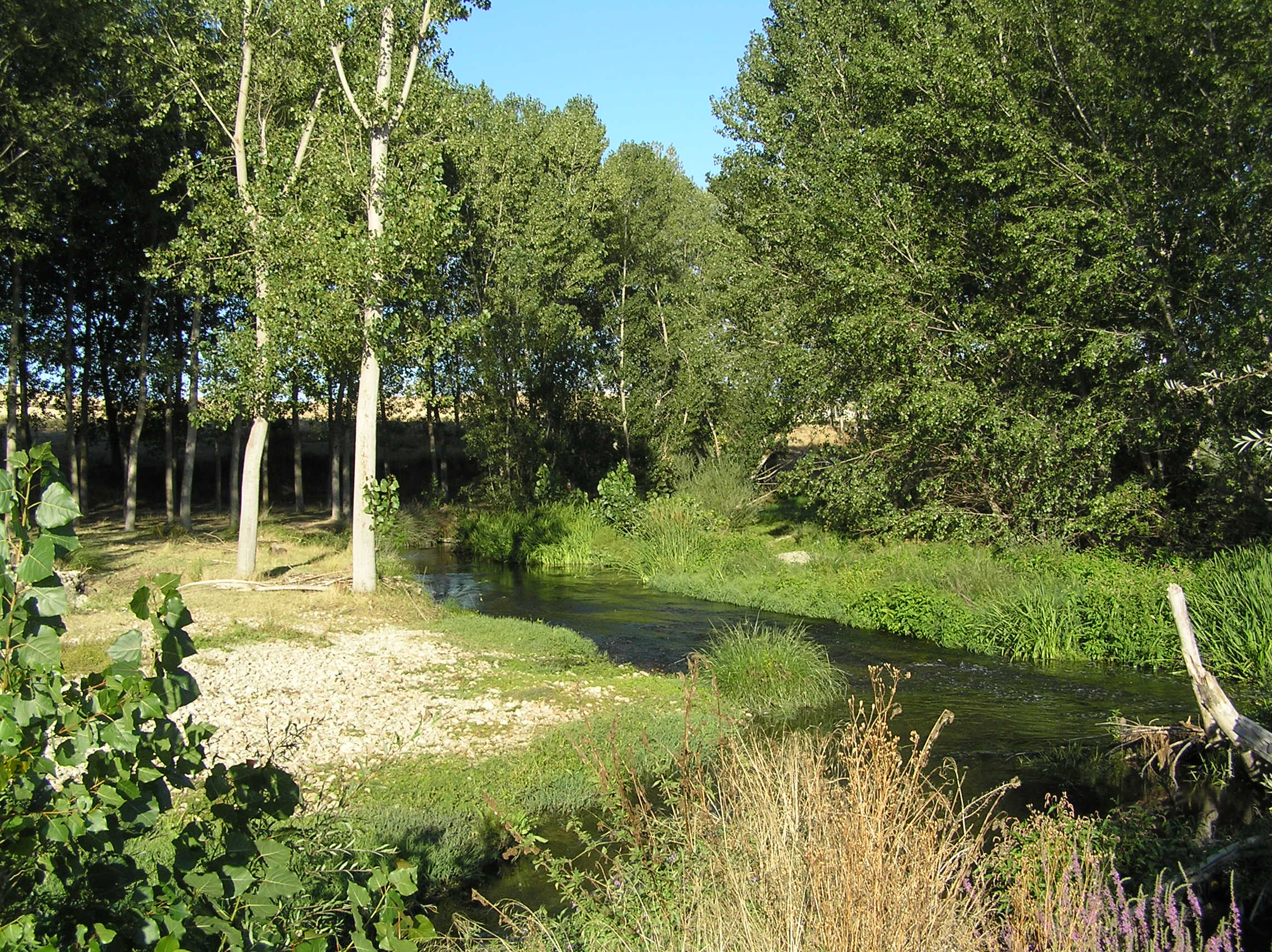
- The Eresma River as it passes through Los Redondillos (Los Huertos, Segovia)

Location
- Country: Spain
- Region: Castile and León

Physical characteristics
- Mouth: Adaja River
  - coordinates: 41°26′38″N 4°45′15″W
- Length: 134 km

Basin features
- Progression: Adaja→ Douro→ Atlantic Ocean

The Eresma is a river in central Spain. It flows through Castile and León (specifically the provinces of Segovia and Valladolid). It has a total length of 134 km and drains a basin with an area of 2,940 km^{2}.

== Name ==
The name of the river has been derived from the Iberian "Iri-sama" which means "that which surrounds the big city". The city referred to here is not Segovia itself as sometimes thought, but rather the town of Coca located some 50 km away.

== Geography ==
The Eresma River starts in Valsaín valley of the Sierra de Guadarrama, where the confluence of several streams forms the river. Most of these streams descend from the slopes of mountains like Peñalara, Siete Picos, and Montón de Trigo. Its most important tributaries are Moros and the Voltoya that flow northward. After passing through San Ildefonso and Palazuelos, it reaches the city of Segovia, which it surrounds in a closed meander. Eresma river then runs northwest, passing near Hontanares, Los Huertos, Bernardos, Navas de Oro, Coca, and Villeguillo. It enters the province of Valladolid through Olmedo, Pedrajas, Alcazarén, and Hornillos. Later it flows from the right into the Adaja in Matapozuelos.

The Eresma River has a pluvio-nival regime, which means that it has a period of high water flow in the autumn and winter season in proportion to precipitation and a short, violent water flow in the spring when the snow melts.
