= Adaja =

River in Spain

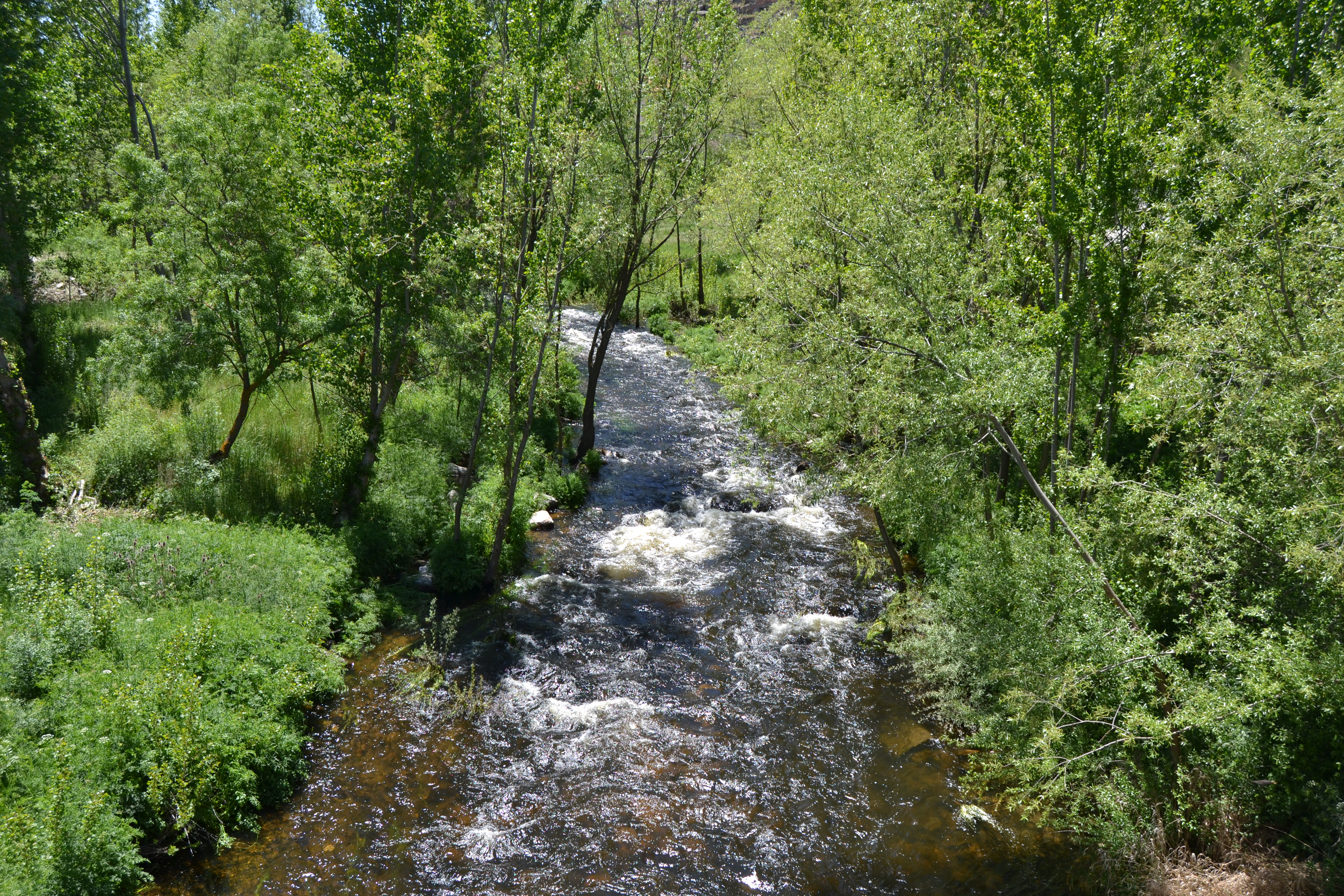
- The Adaja near Ávila

Location
- Country: Spain

Physical characteristics
- Source
  - location: Fuente Berroqueña
  - coordinates: 40°32′22.57″N 5°09′10.09″W
- Mouth
  - location: Douro
  - coordinates: 41°31′59.53″N 4°51′47.81″W
- Length: 163 km (101 mi)
- Basin size: 5,328 km^{2} (2,057 sq mi)

Basin features
- Progression: Douro→ Atlantic Ocean
- Tributaries
  - right: Eresma

The Adaja (Note: Spanish pronunciation: [aˈðaxa]) is a river located in the centre of the Iberian Peninsula, in Spain. A major left-bank tributary of the Douro, it flows 163 kilometres (101 mi), and its river basin drains an area of 5,328 square kilometres (2,057 mi^{2}).

It has its source in the so-called Fuente Berroqueña (Villatoro, province of Ávila), near the saddle point between La Serrota and the Sierra de Ávila. Initially following a southwest-northeast course through the Amblés Valley, the Adaja then bends northward in Ávila, later receiving the contribution of its most important tributary, the Eresma, near Matapozuelos. It empties into the Douro in the province of Valladolid near the town of Aniago.

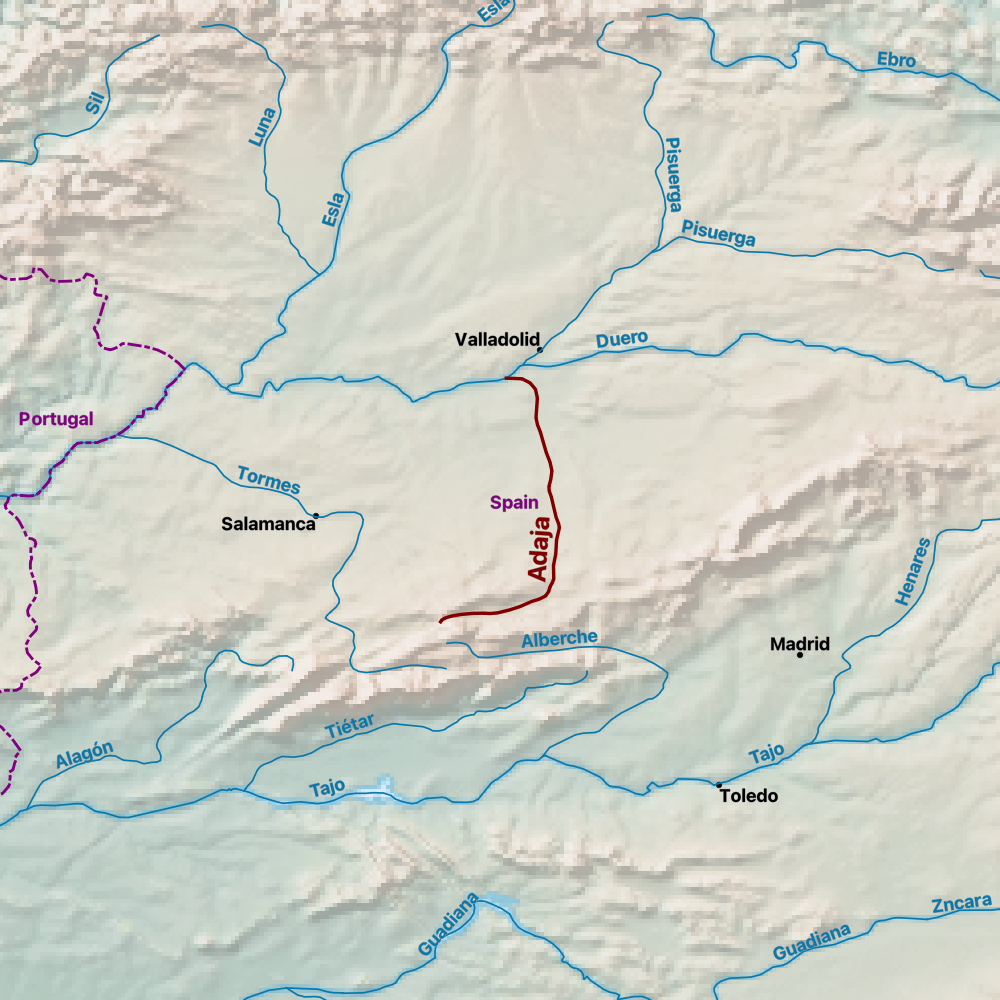
River map
