= Villeguillo =

- Municipality
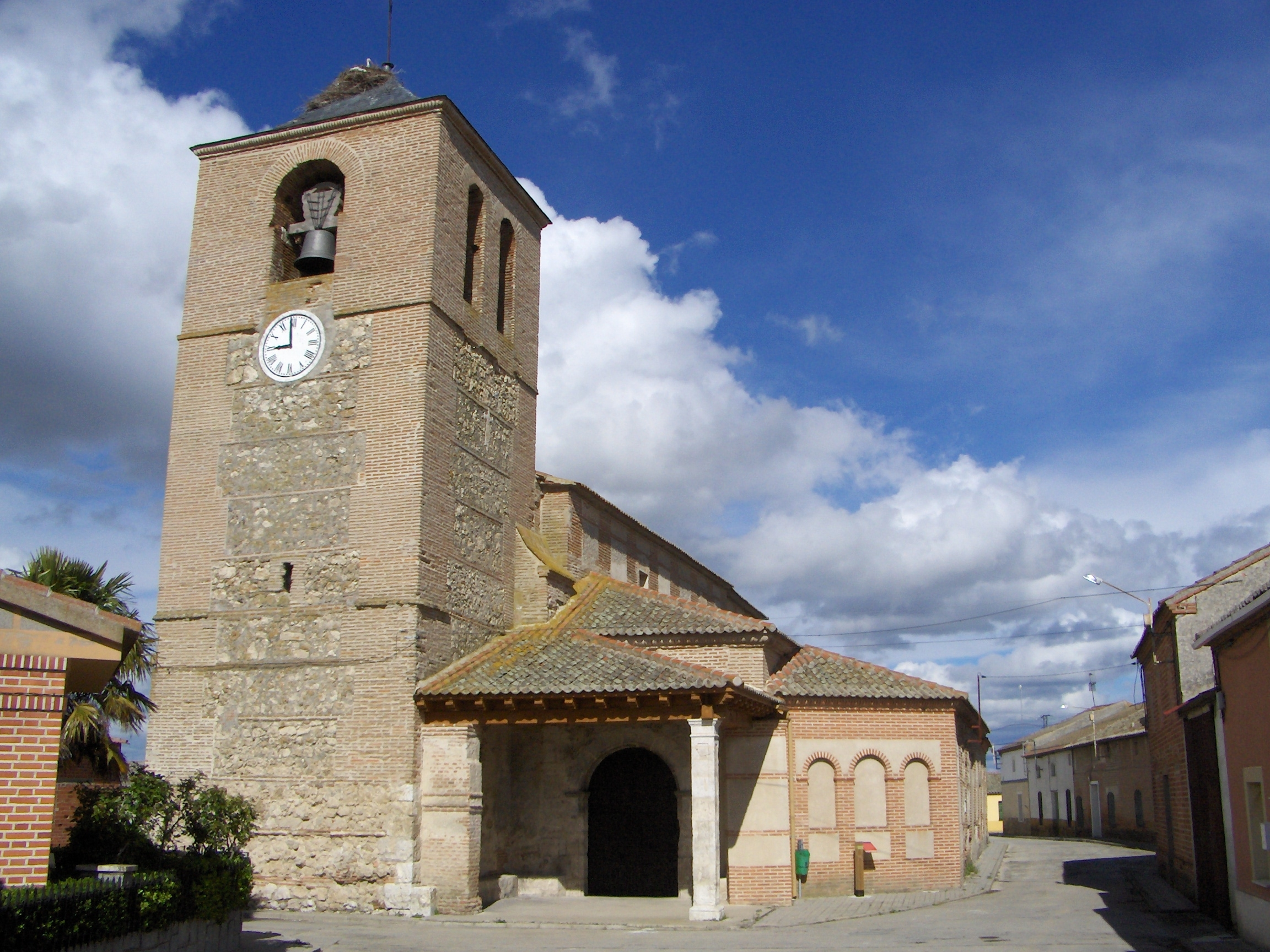

- Flag Coat of arms
- Interactive map of Villeguillo
- Country: Spain
- Autonomous community: Castile and León
- Province: Segovia
- Municipality: Villeguillo

Area
  - Total: 16.69 km^{2} (6.44 sq mi)
- Elevation: 770 m (2,530 ft)

Population (2025-01-01)
  - Total: 129
  - Density: 7.73/km^{2} (20.0/sq mi)
- Time zone: UTC+1 (CET)
  - Summer (DST): UTC+2 (CEST)
- Website: Official website

Villeguillo is a municipality located in the province of Segovia, Castile and León, Spain. According to the 2008 census (INE), the municipality has a population of 191 inhabitants.

== History ==
This village founded about 1247 for Knight Vela. It has a palace of Marquis of Herrera.

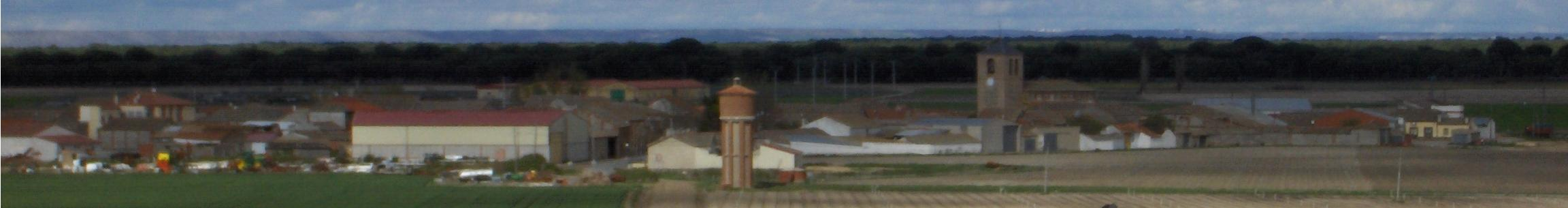
Paronamic view of Villeguillo.
