= Los Huertos =

- Municipality
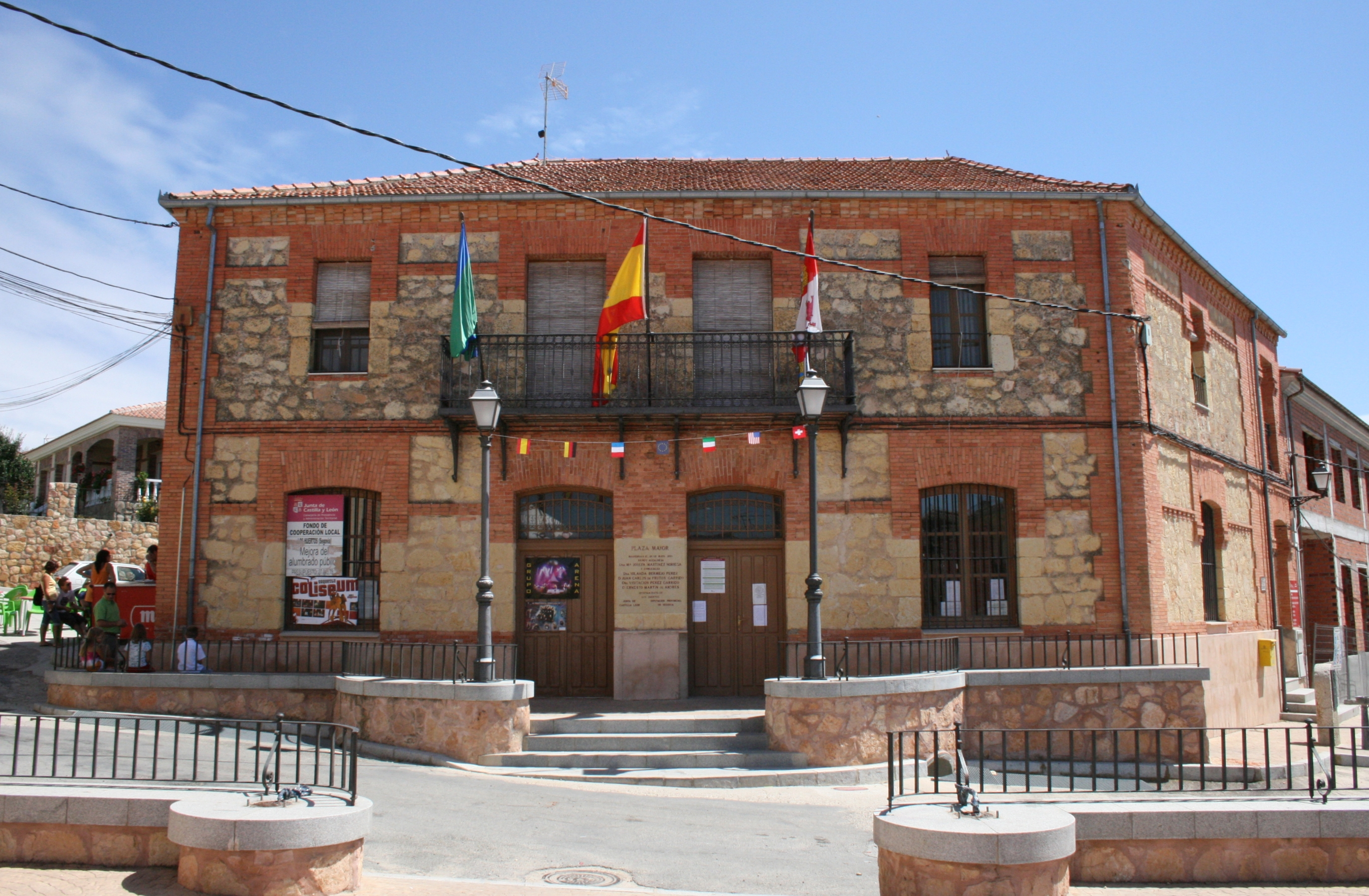
- Los Huertos Town Hall (Segovia)

- Flag Coat of arms

- Location in Spain. Los Huertos (Spain)
- Coordinates: 41°00′37″N 4°13′08″W
- Country: Spain
- Autonomous community: Castile and León
- Province: Segovia
- Municipality: Los Huertos

Area
  - Total: 17 km^{2} (6.6 sq mi)

Population (2025-01-01)
  - Total: 173
  - Density: 10/km^{2} (26/sq mi)
- Time zone: UTC+1 (CET)
  - Summer (DST): UTC+2 (CEST)
- Website: Official website

Los Huertos is a municipality located in the province of Segovia, Castile and León, Spain. According to the 2004 census (INE), the municipality has a population of 152 inhabitants.
