= Santovenia de Pisuerga =

Coordinates: 41°42′N 4°41′W

Santovenia de Pisuerga, Spain
- Flag Coat of arms
- Interactive map of Santovenia de Pisuerga, Spain
- Country: Spain
- Autonomous community: Castile and León
- Province: Valladolid
- Municipality: Santovenia de Pisuerga

Area
  - Total: 13.74 km^{2} (5.31 sq mi)

Population (2019)
  - Total: 4,480
  - Density: 326/km^{2} (844/sq mi)
- Time zone: UTC+1 (CET)
  - Summer (DST): UTC+2 (CEST)

Santovenia de Pisuerga is a municipality located in the province of Valladolid, Castile and León, Spain. It has a population of 4,480 inhabitants.

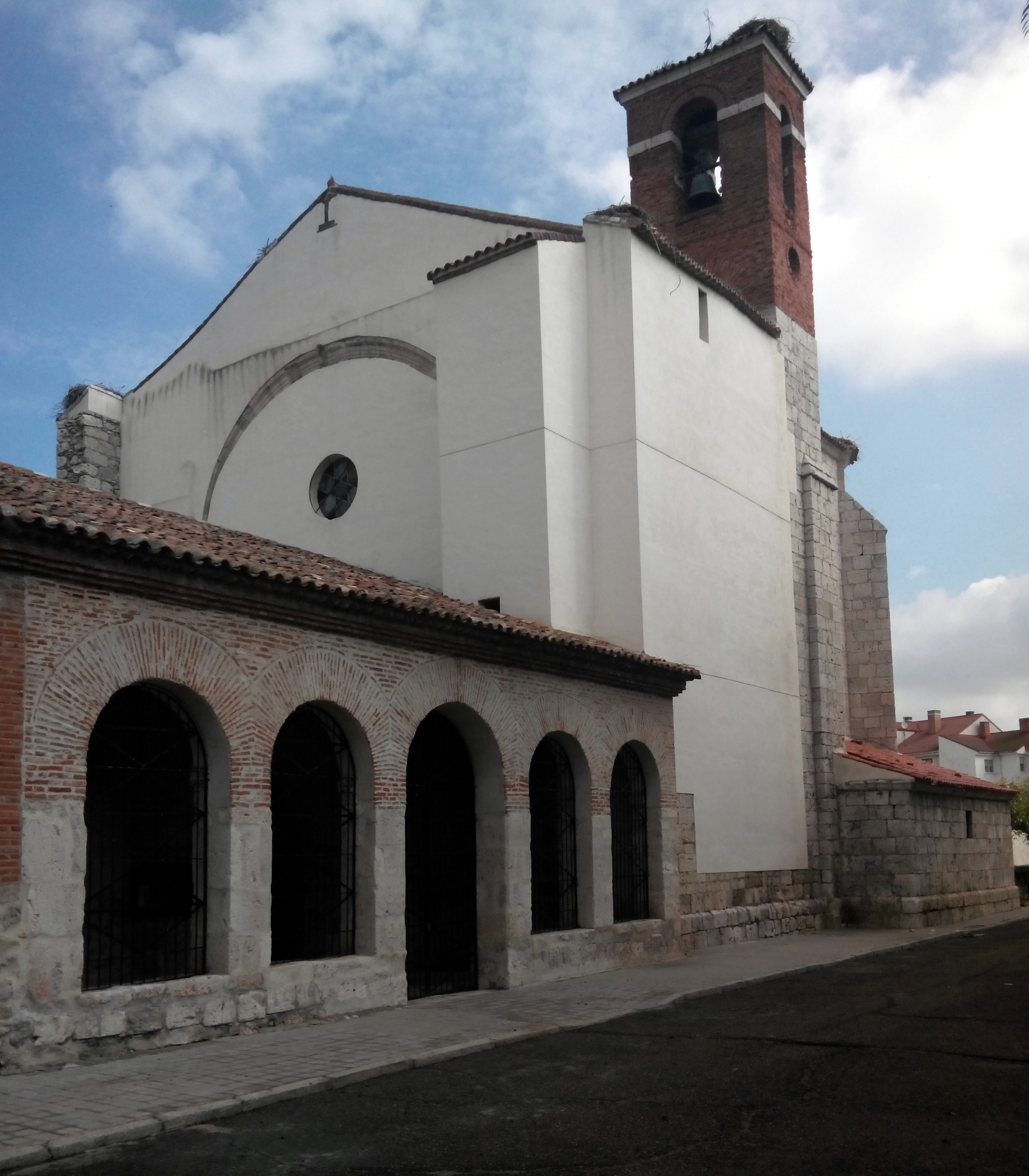
Church of St. John the Baptist in Santovenia de Pisuerga, Valladolid, Spain

== See also ==
- Cuisine of the province of Valladolid
