= Hornillos de Eresma =

Hornillos de Eresma, Spain
- Flag Coat of arms

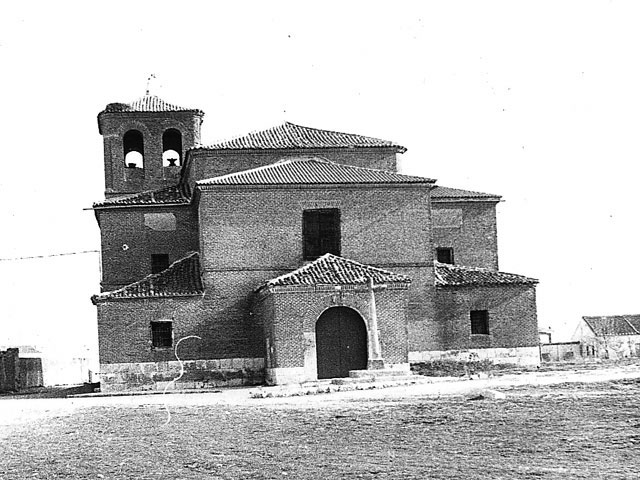
- Church of San Miguel Arcángel
- Coordinates: 41°22′N 4°43′W
- Country: Spain
- Autonomous community: Castile and León
- Province: Valladolid
- Municipality: Hornillos de Eresma

Area
  - Total: 34 km^{2} (13 sq mi)

Population (2025-01-01)
  - Total: 182
  - Density: 5.4/km^{2} (14/sq mi)
- Time zone: UTC+1 (CET)
  - Summer (DST): UTC+2 (CEST)

Hornillos de Eresma is a municipality located in the province of Valladolid, Castile and León, Spain. According to the 2004 census (INE), the municipality has a population of 193 inhabitants.
