= Matapozuelos =

Coordinates: 41°25′N 4°47′W

Matapozuelos, Spain
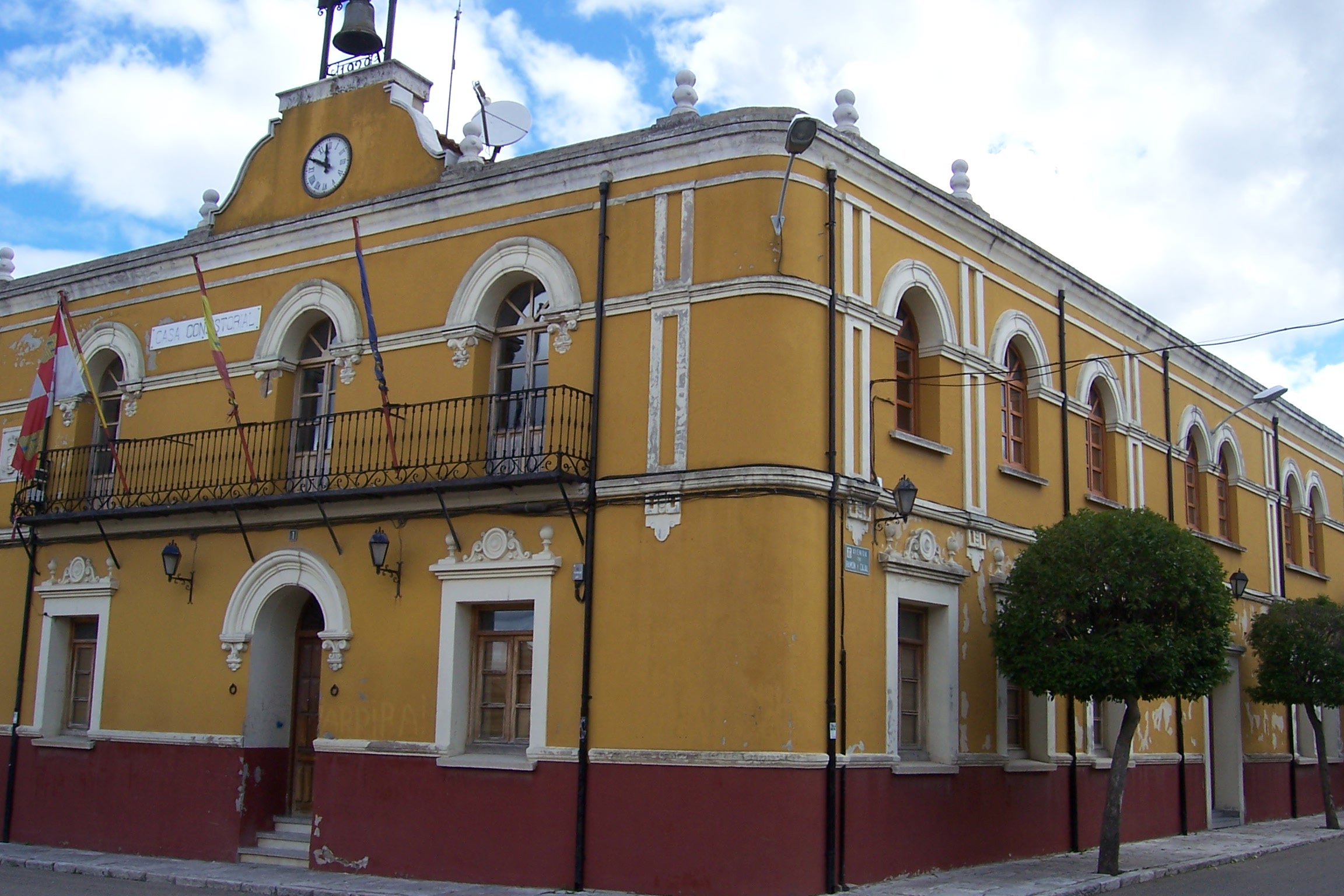
- Town hall

- Coat of arms
- Interactive map of Matapozuelos, Spain
- Country: Spain
- Autonomous community: Castile and León
- Province: Valladolid
- Municipality: Matapozuelos

Area
  - Total: 50 km^{2} (19 sq mi)

Population (2025-01-01)
  - Total: 977
  - Density: 20/km^{2} (51/sq mi)
- Time zone: UTC+1 (CET)
  - Summer (DST): UTC+2 (CEST)

Matapozuelos is a municipality located in the province of Valladolid, Castile and León, Spain. According to the 2004 census (INE), the municipality had a population of 1,024 inhabitants.

== Gallery ==
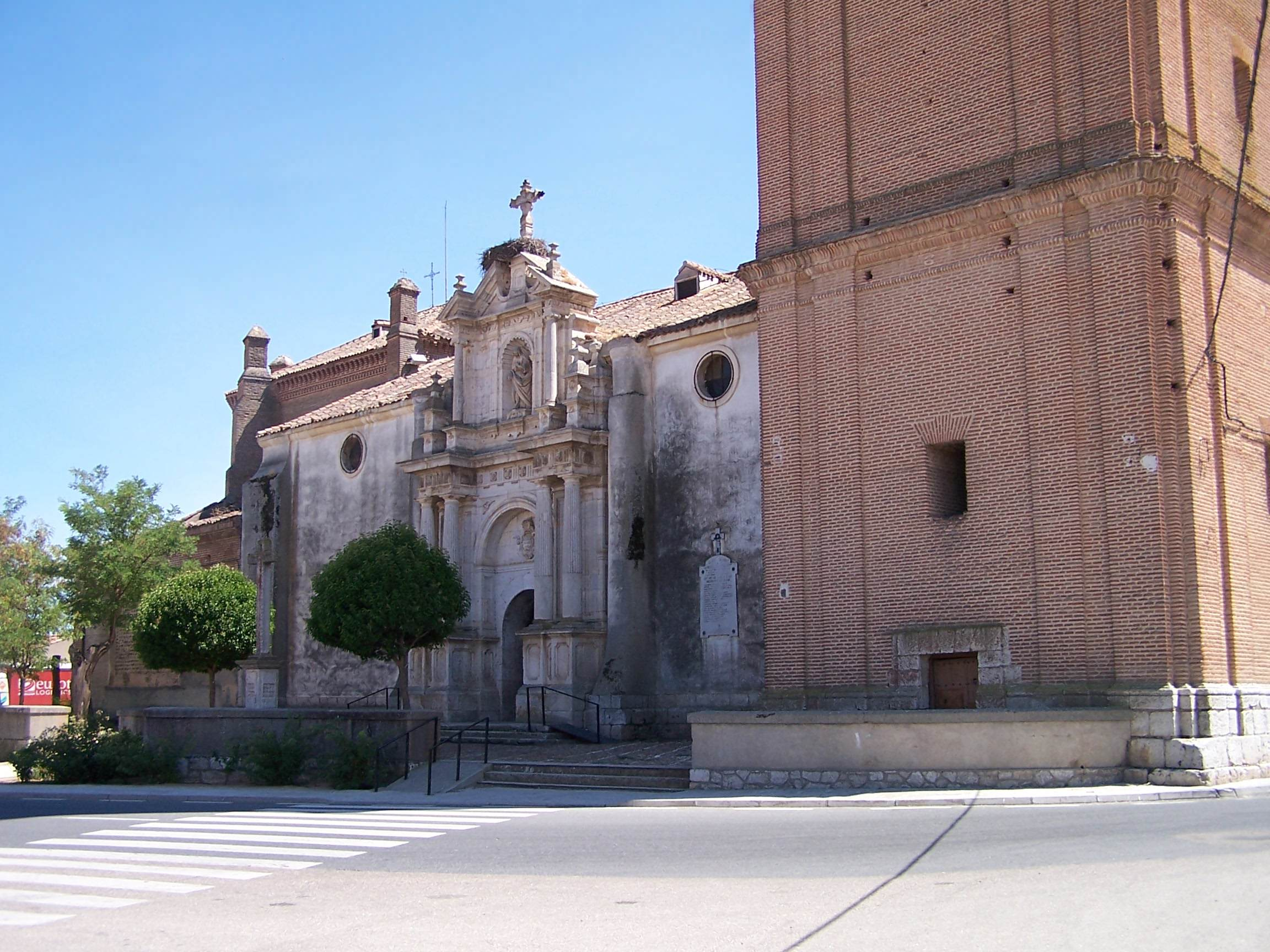
Matapozuelos Church

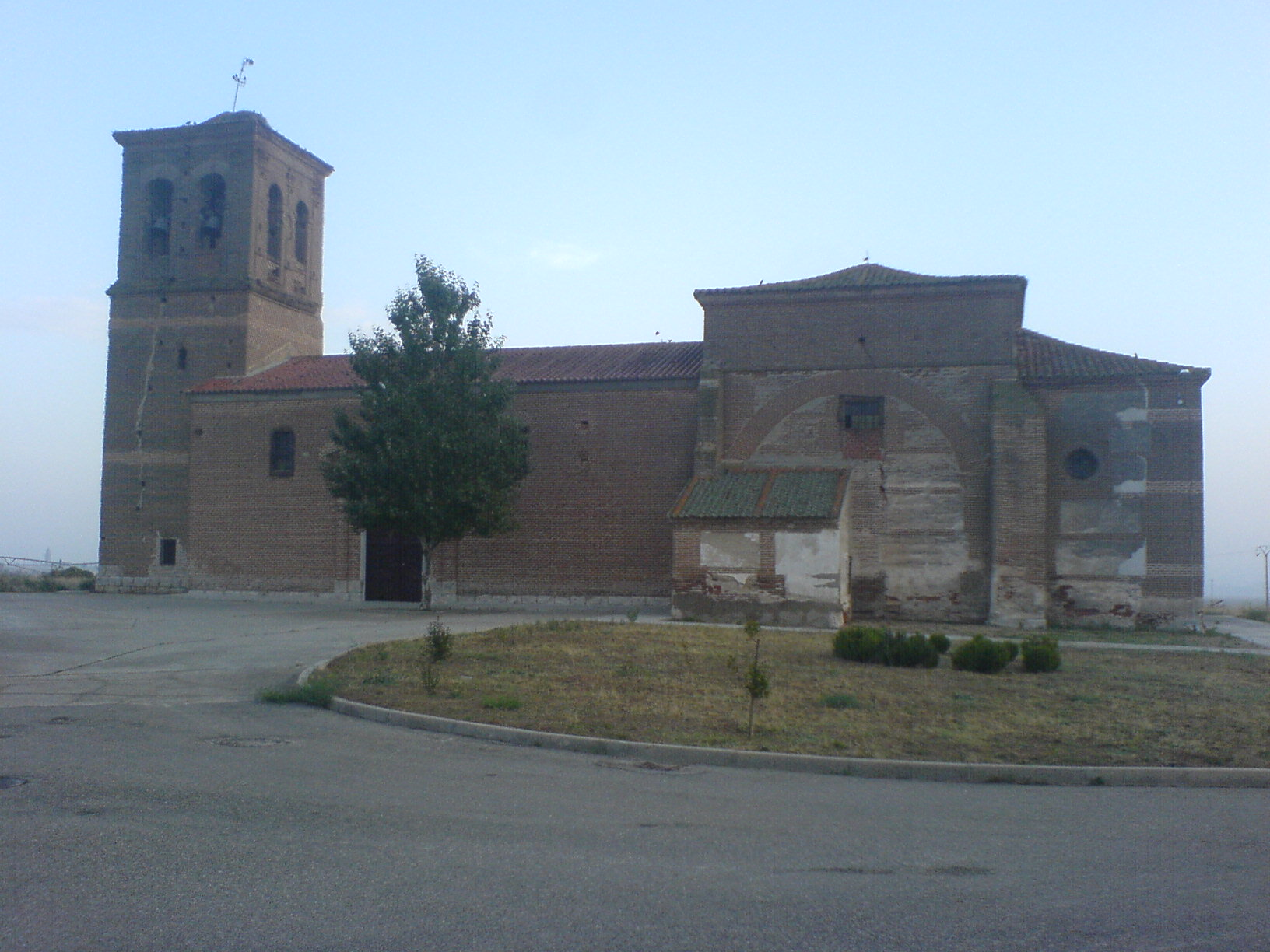
Iglesia parroquial of Villalba de Adaja

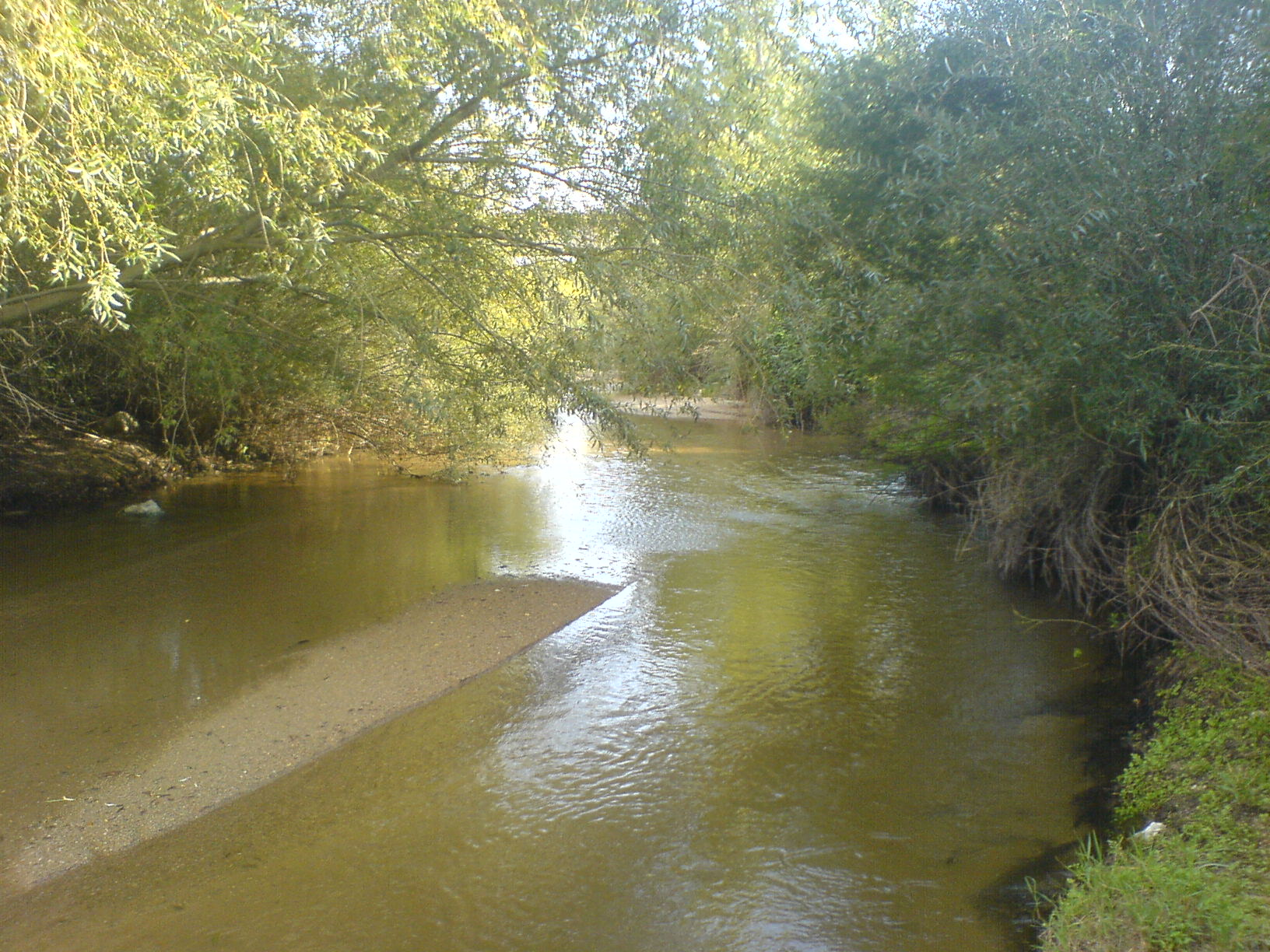
Adaja River in Matapozuelos

== See also ==
- Cuisine of the province of Valladolid
