= Minimundus =

Miniature park in Klagenfurt, Carinthia, Austria

- Previously known as Minieurop
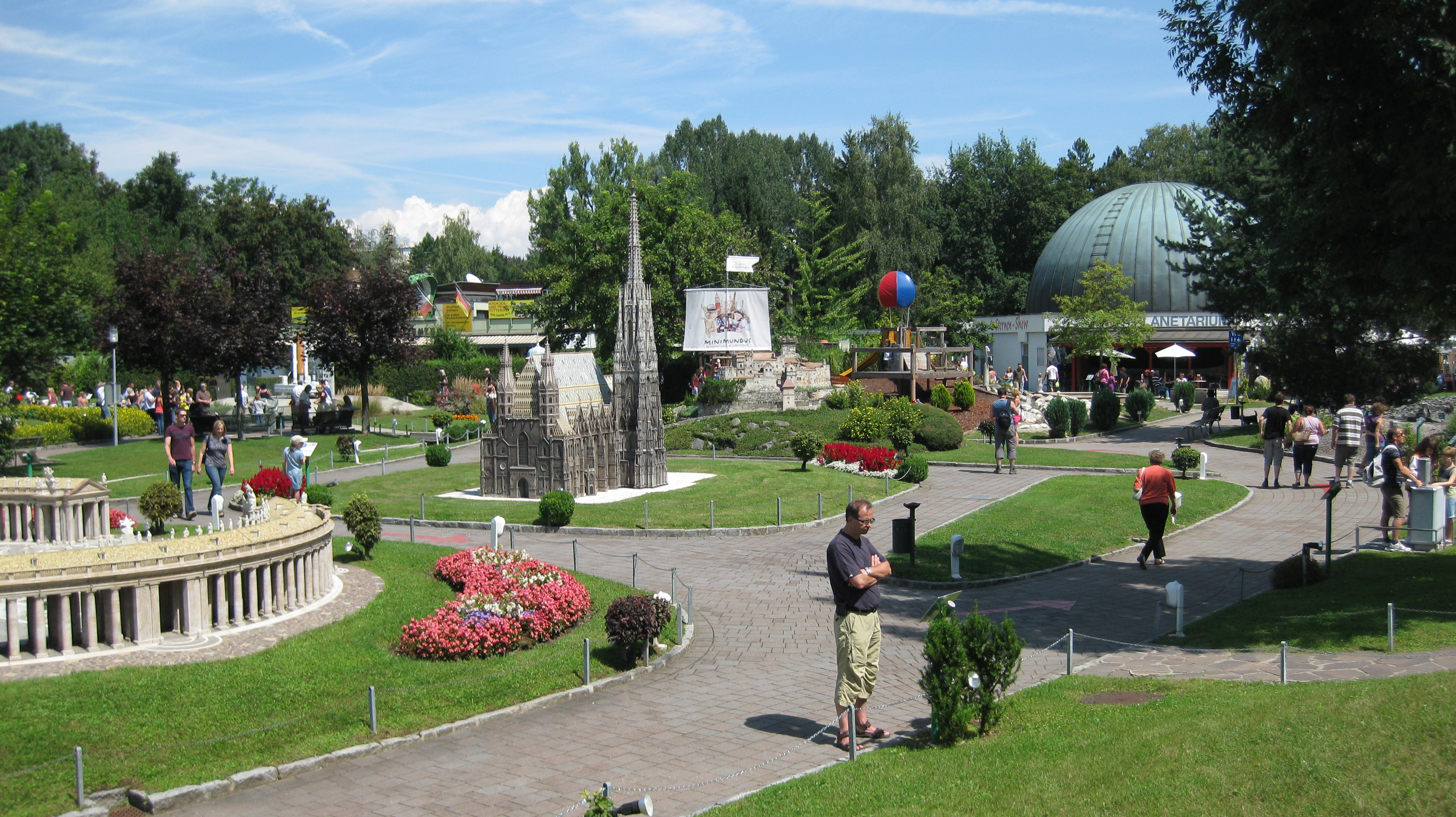
- Interactive map of Minimundus
- Location: Klagenfurt, Carinthia, Austria
- Coordinates: 46°37′11″N 14°15′52″E
- Opened: 1958
- Owner: Minimundus GmbH
- Website: minimundus.at

Minimundus is a miniature park in Klagenfurt in Carinthia, Austria. It displays over 150 miniature models of architecture from around the world, built at a ratio of 1:25.

== History ==
Since its opening in 1958, more than 15 million visitors have visited the 26,000 square meters park. The proceeds benefit the children's help organization Rettet das Kind ("Save the Child"), which owns the park.

== Models ==
A small selection of the models:

- RMS Titanic in its sinking position
- St. Stephen's Cathedral
- Statue of Liberty
- Saint Peter's Basilica
- Cathedral of Brasília
- Toronto CN Tower
- Eiffel Tower
- Hochosterwitz Castle in Austria
- Sydney Opera House
- Tower of London
- White House
- Taj Mahal
- Baiturrahman Grand Mosque
- Castillo de Coca
- Atomium
- Many trains of Europe
- The Space Shuttle and its launch pad

Most of the models are transportable and are moved to other areas during off-season winter.

== See also ==
- Madurodam
- Mini-Europe
- Window of the World

== Gallery ==
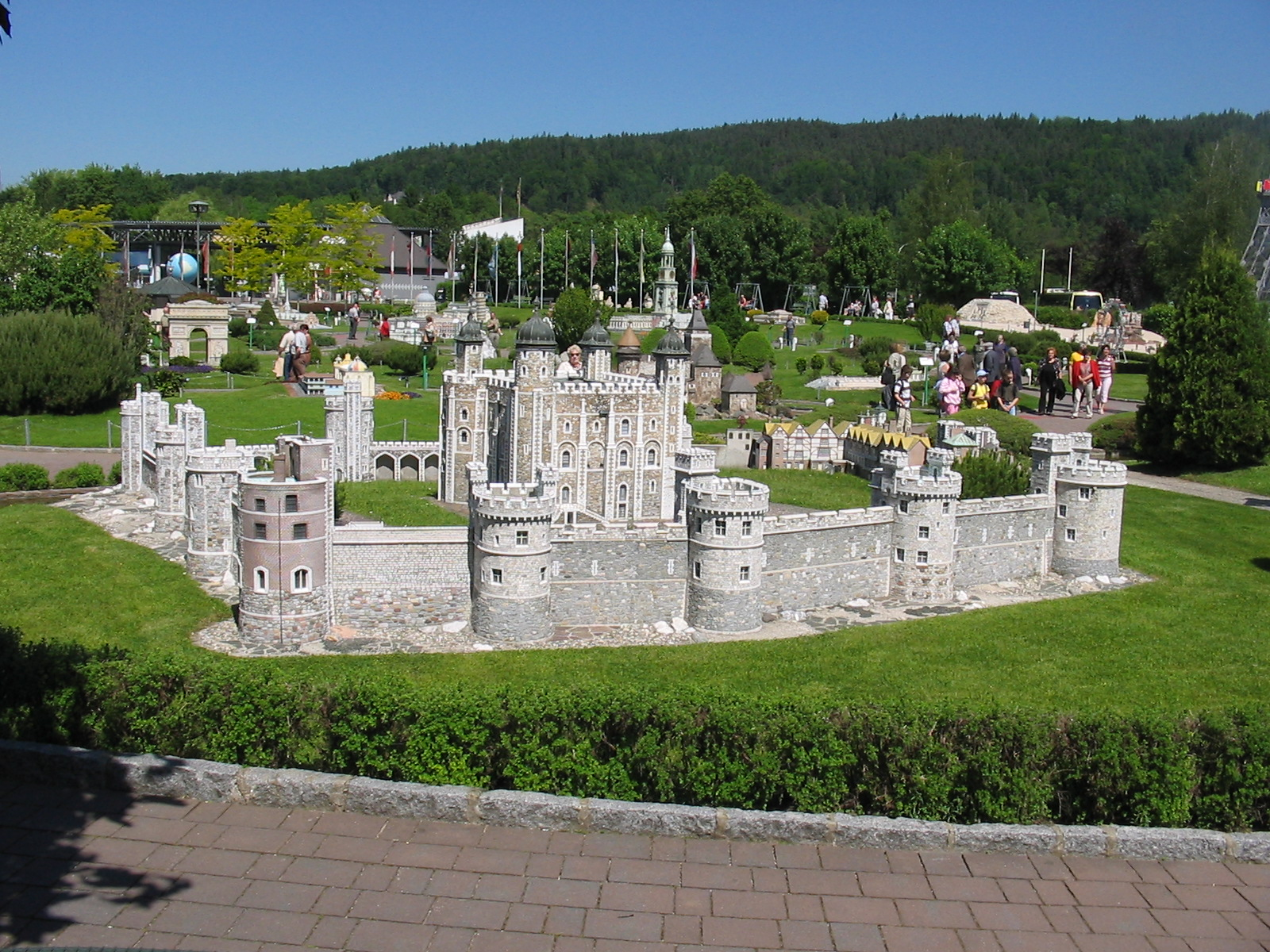
Tower of London model

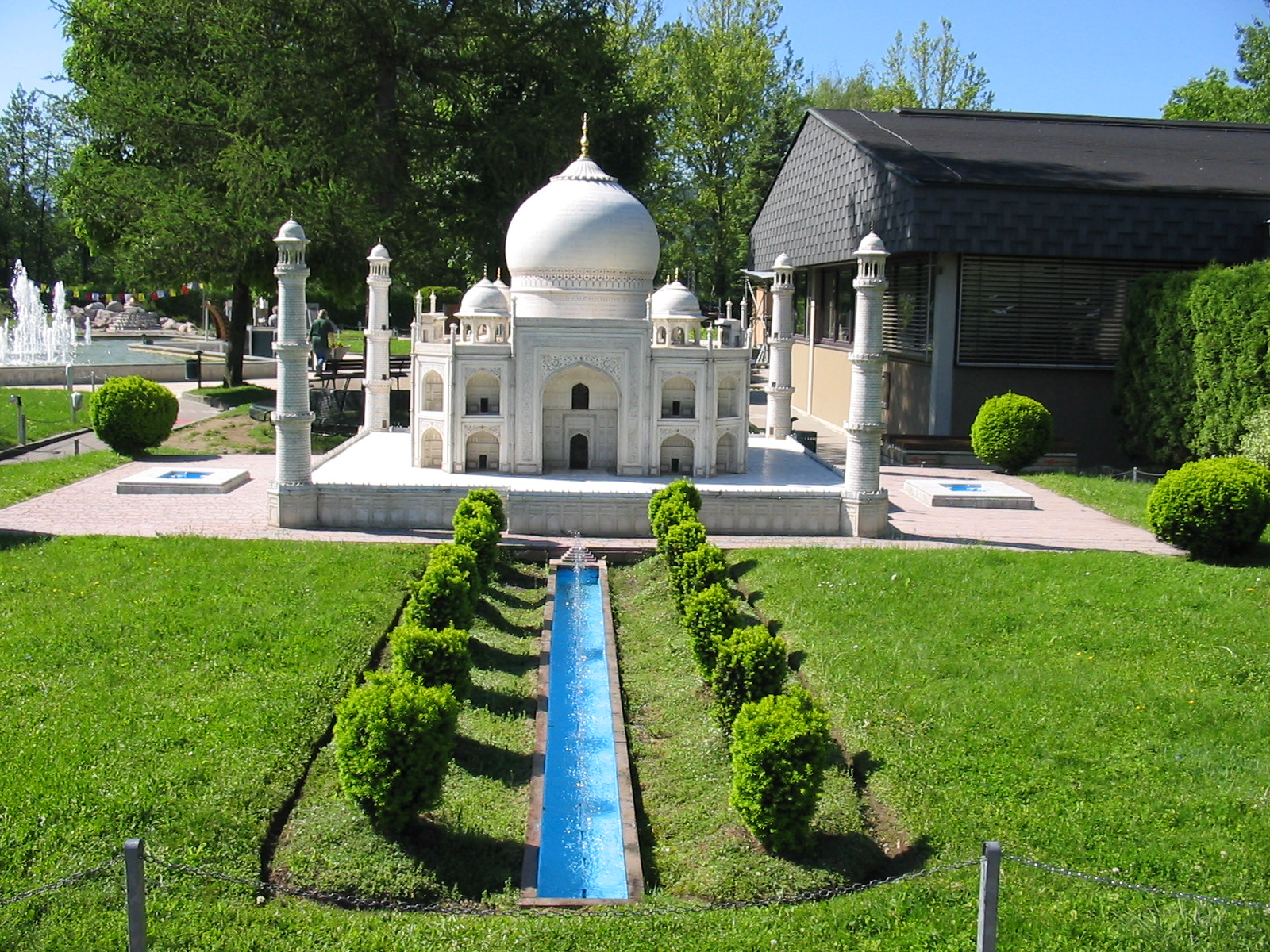
Taj Mahal model

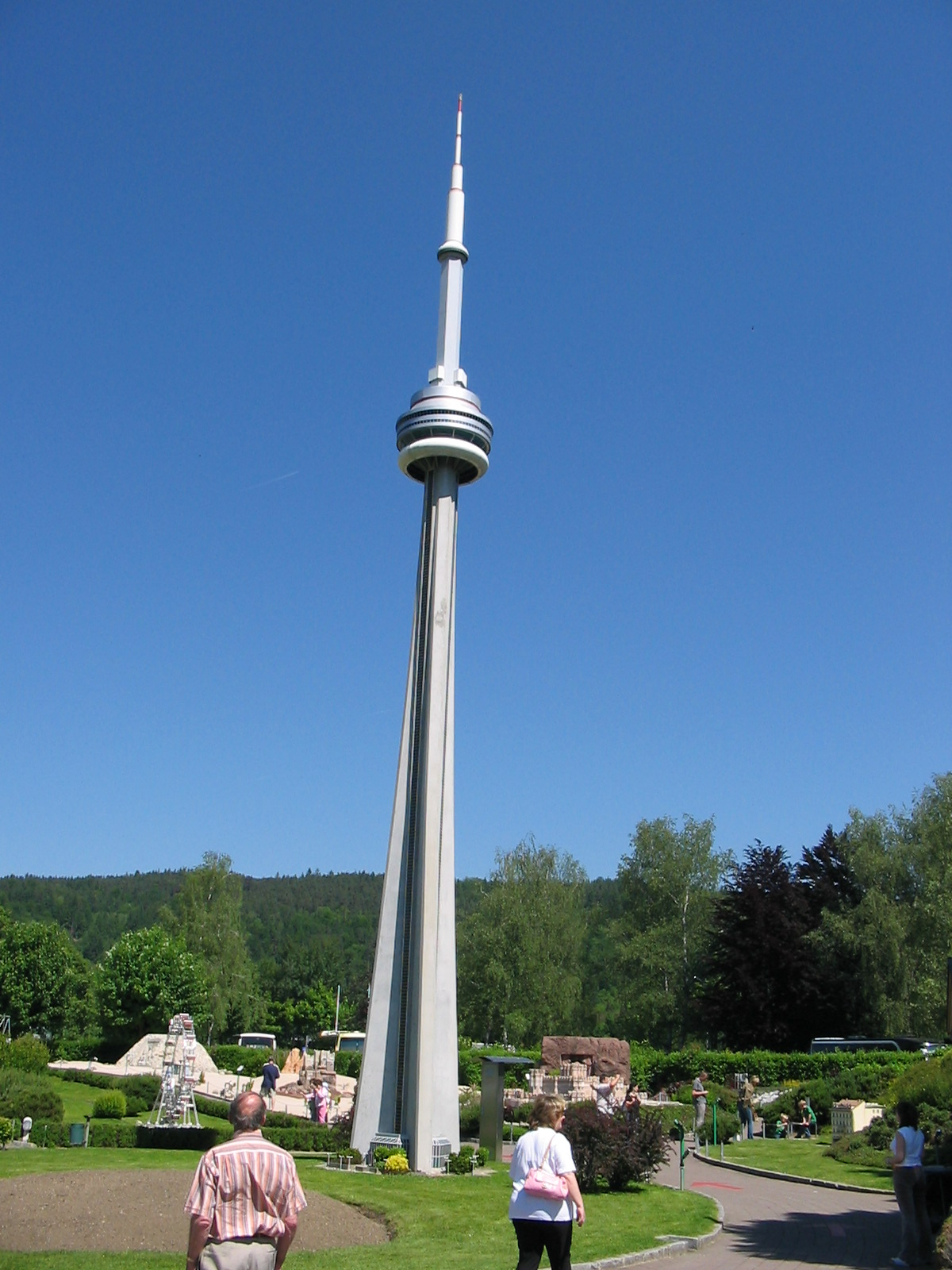
Toronto CN Tower model

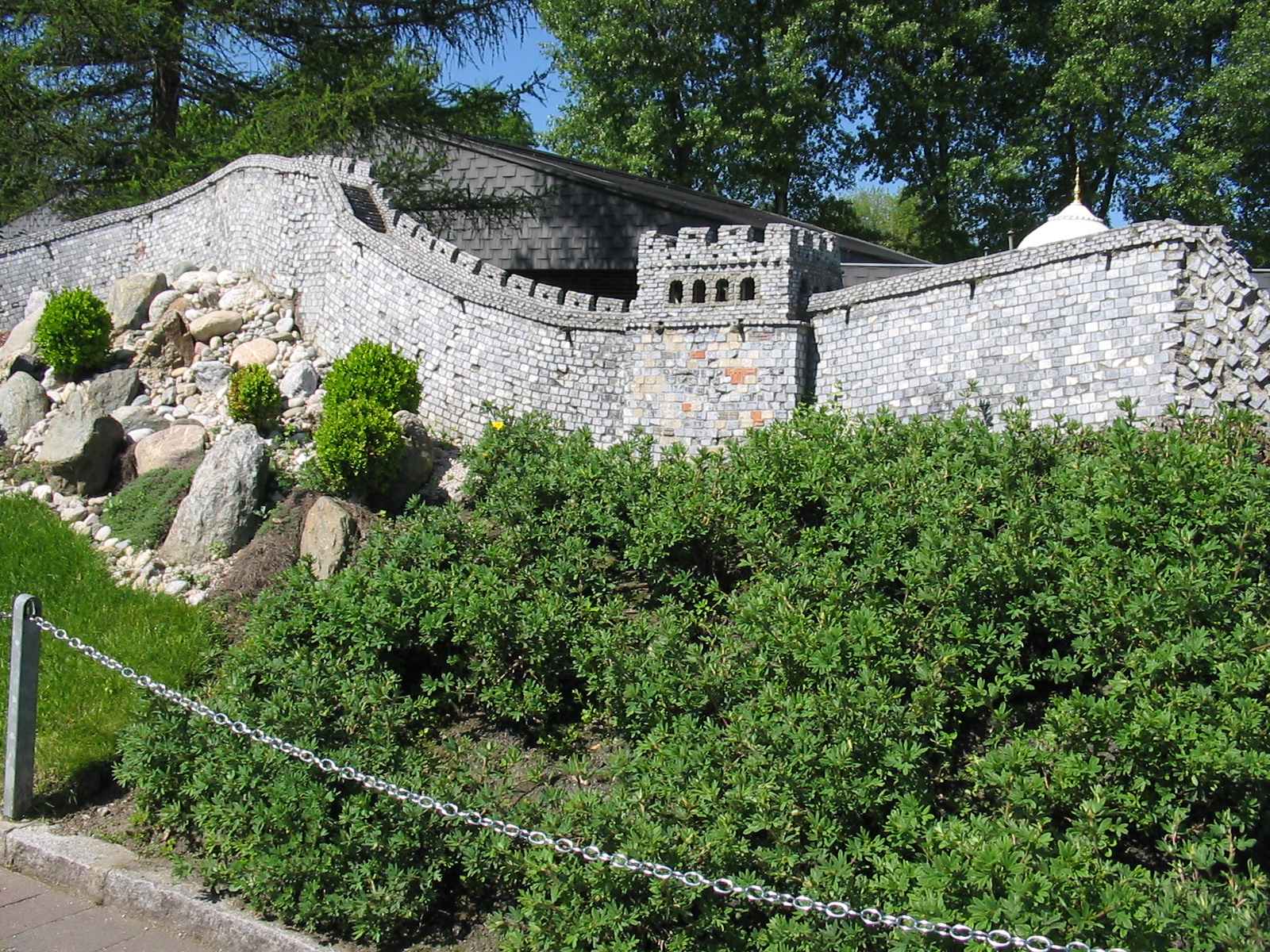
Great Wall of China model

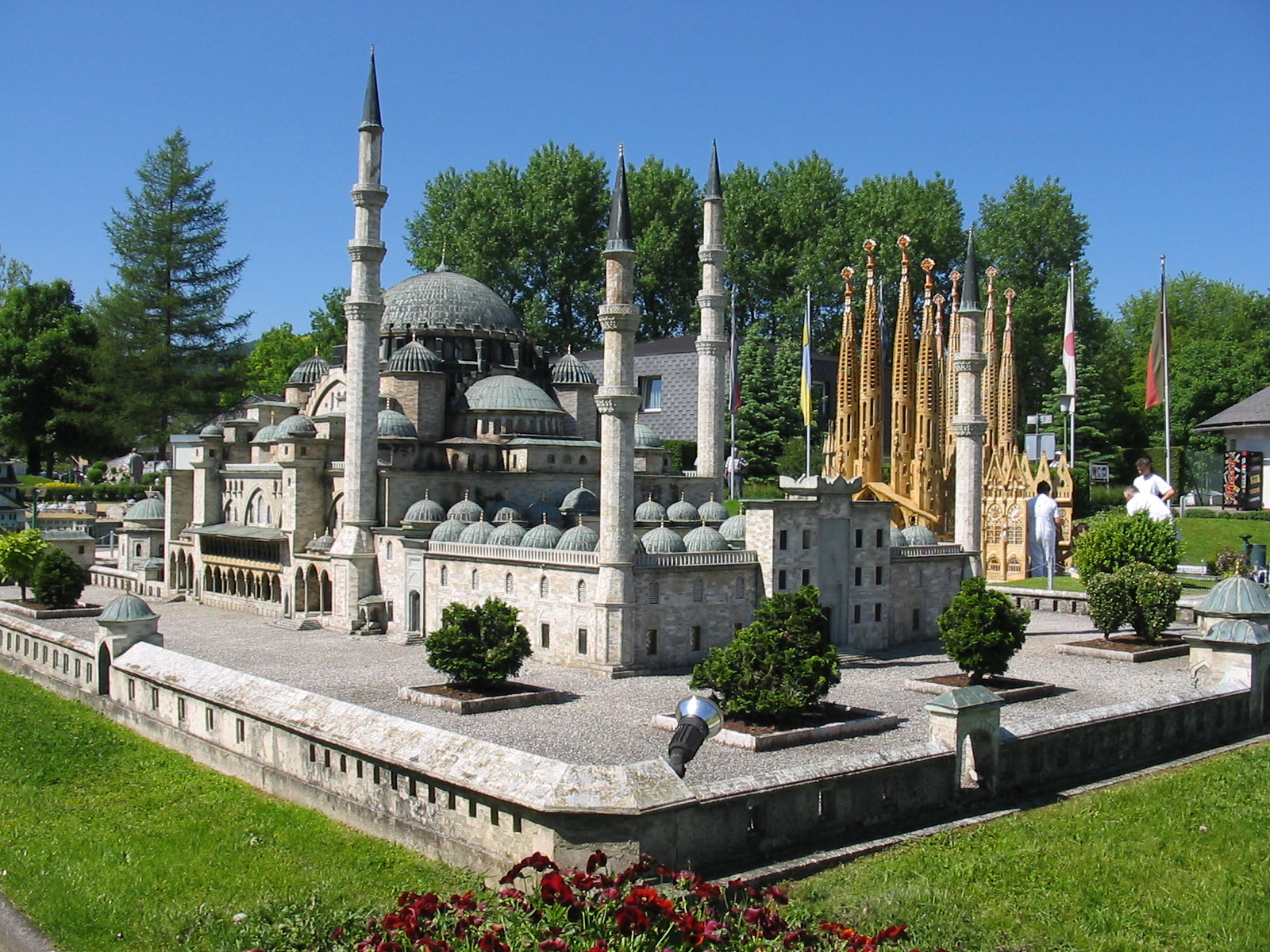
Süleymaniye Mosque model

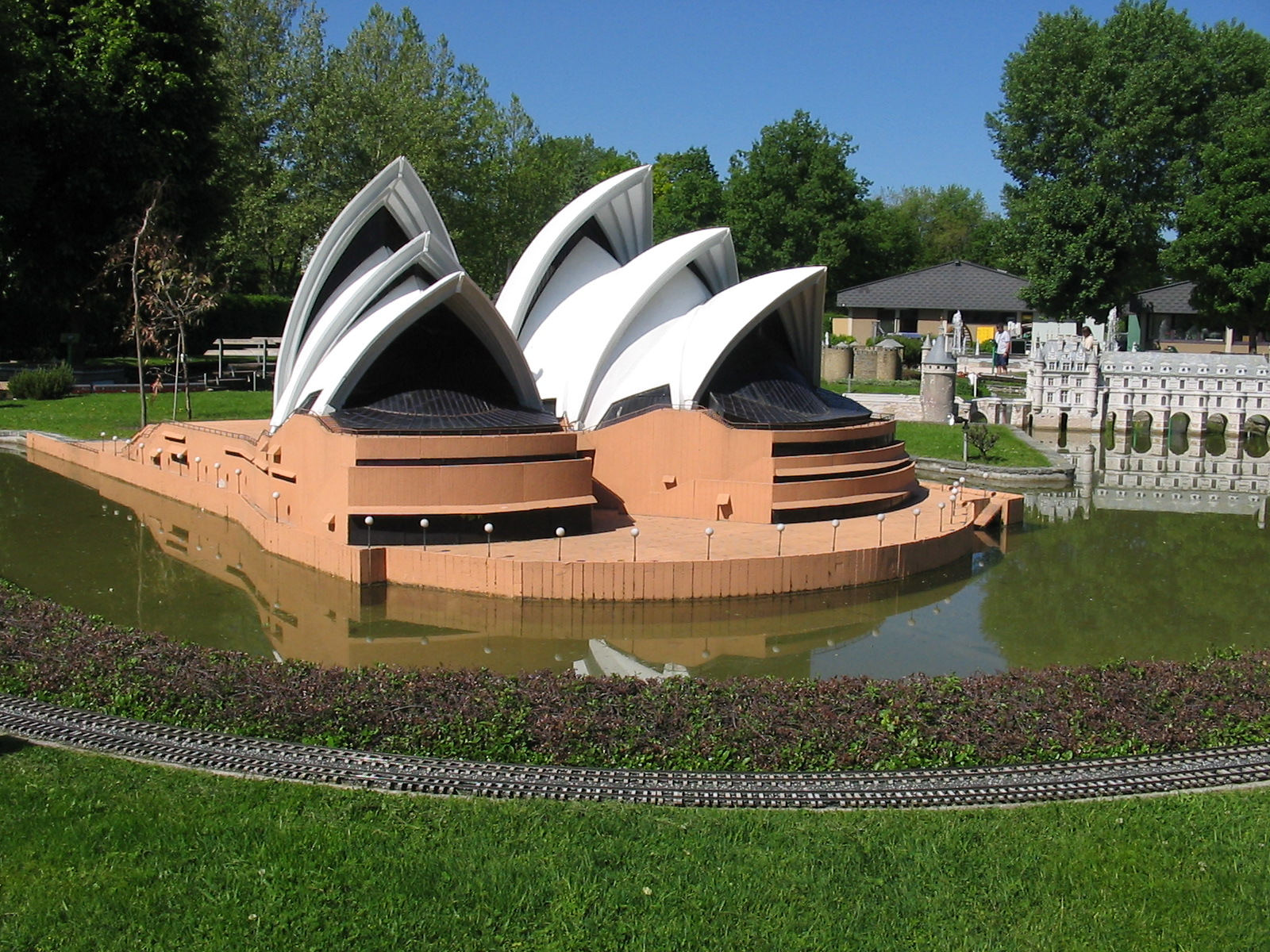
Sydney Opera House model

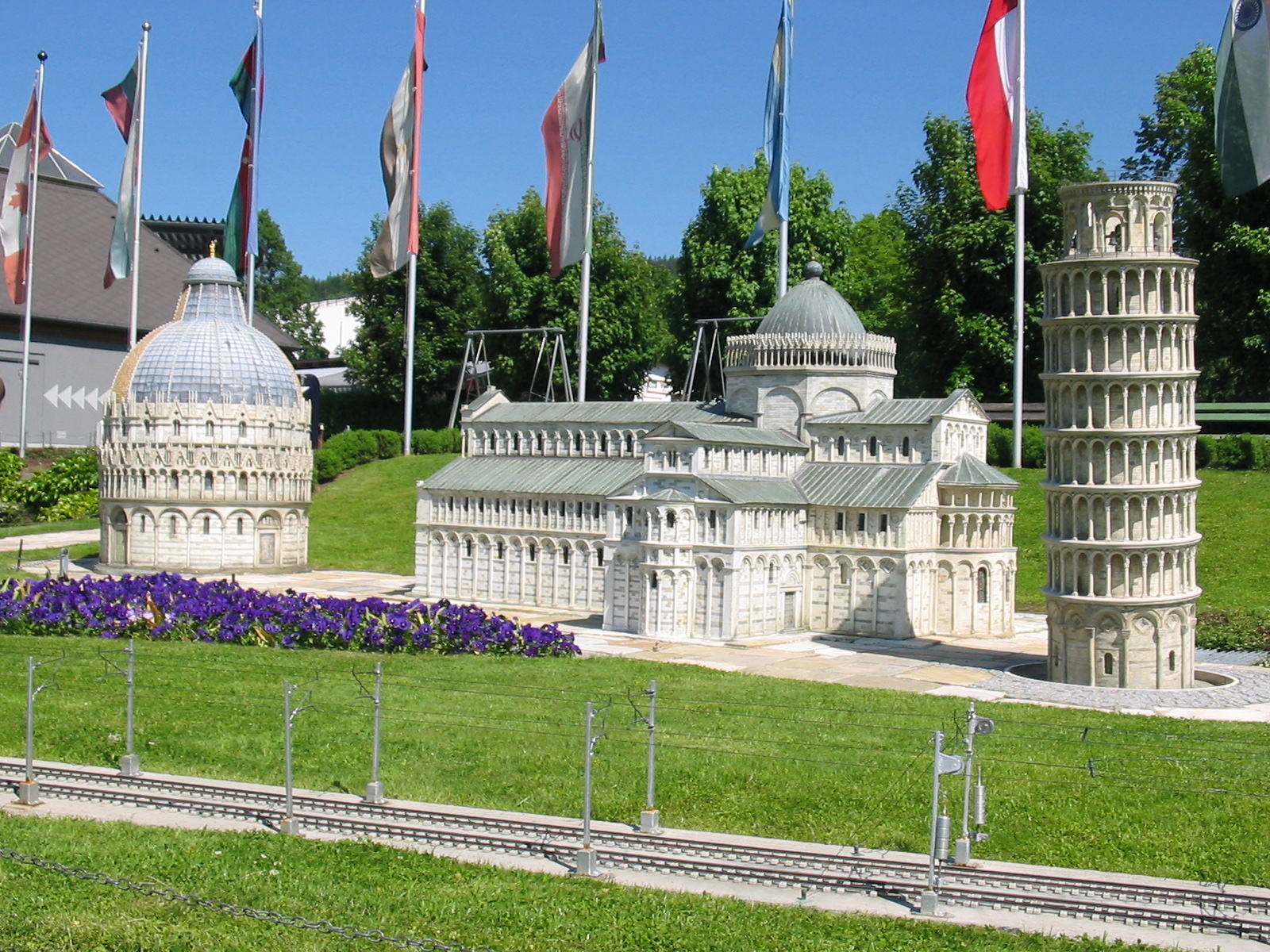
Cathedral and Leaning Tower at Pisa model

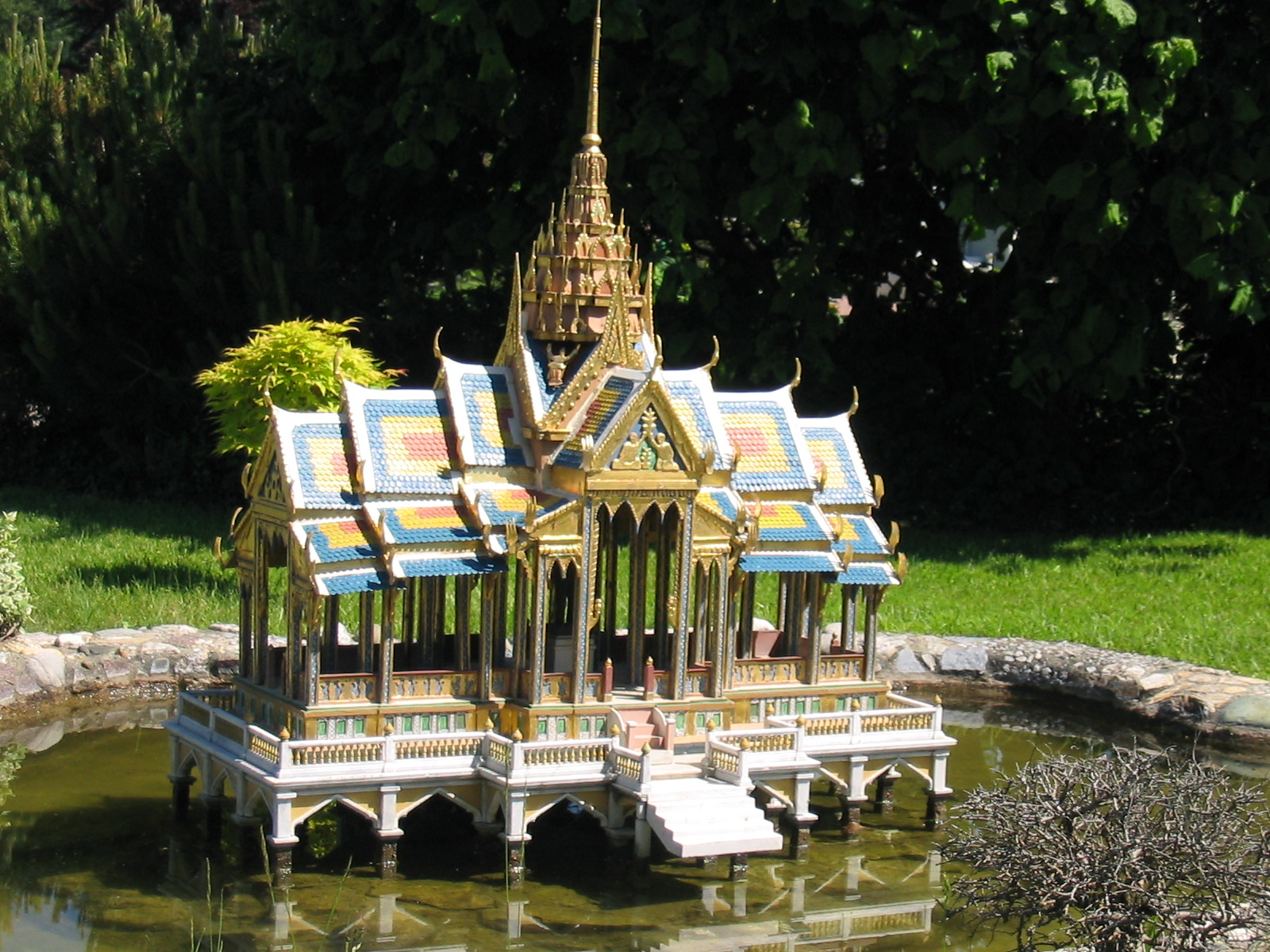
Bang Pa In model

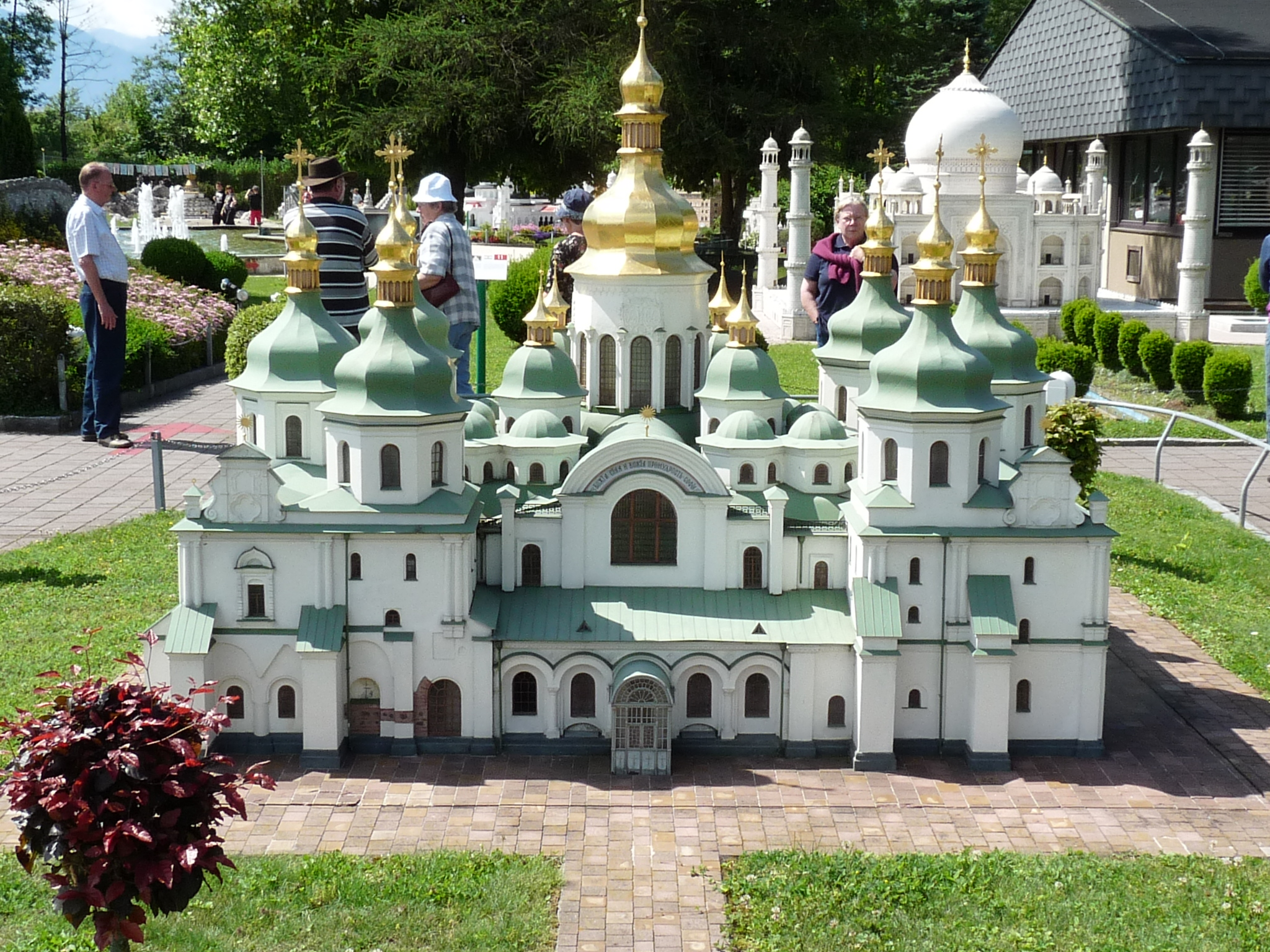
Saint Sophia's Cathedral model
