= Castillo de Coca =

Castle in Castile and Leon, Spain

Coordinates: 41.2151°N 4.5255°W

Castle of Coca
- Castillo de Coca
- Coca, Segovia, Spain
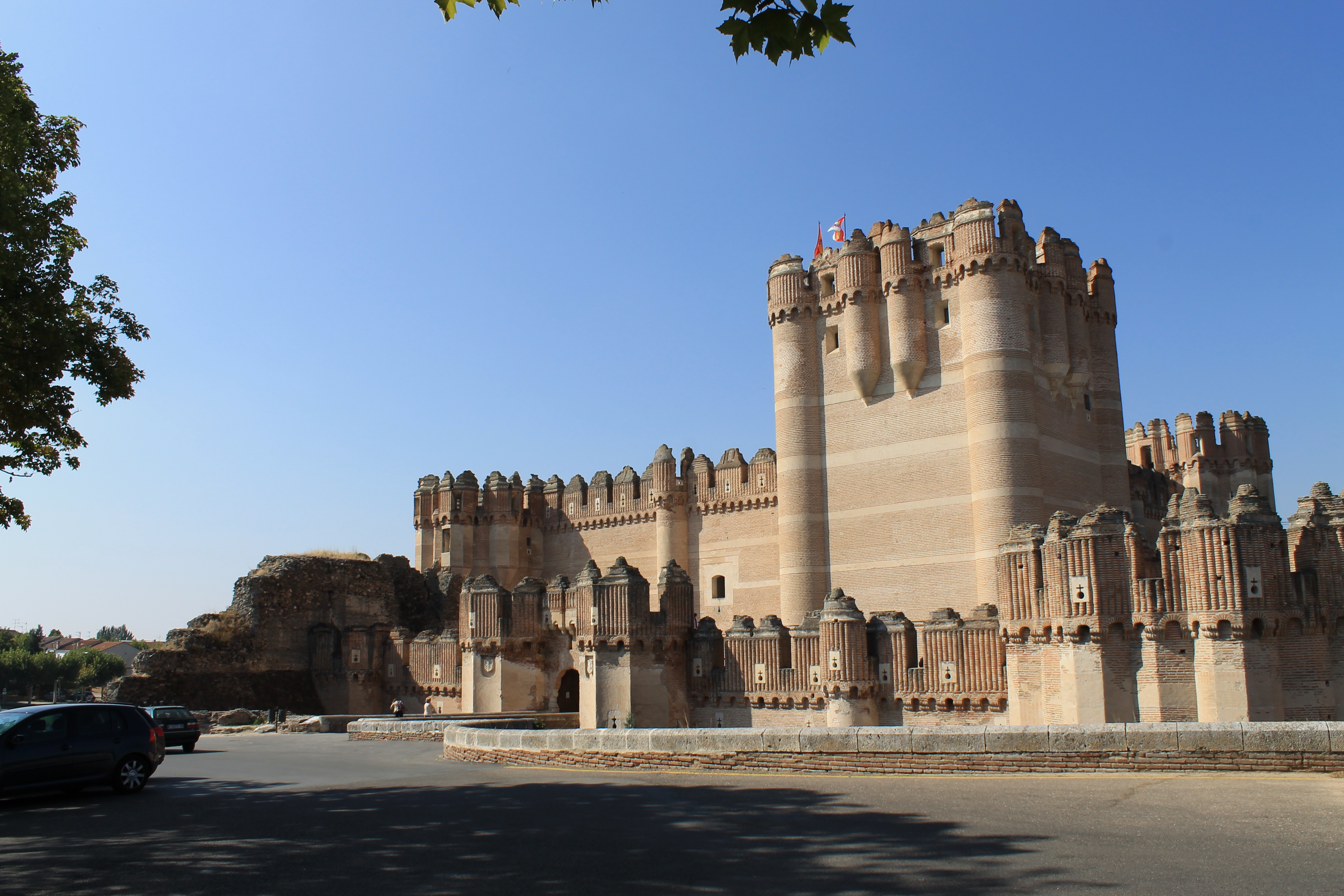
- Castle of Coca

Location

Site history
- Built: Fifteenth century

The Castle of Coca is a castle located in the Coca municipality, central Spain. The castle was constructed in the 15th century and has been considered to be one of the best examples of Spanish Mudejar brickwork which incorporates Moorish Muslim design and construction with Gothic architecture. A scale model of the castle has been built in the Mudéjar theme park and another replica built at a ratio of 1:25 is placed in the Minimundus miniature park in Klagenfurt, Austria.

== Location ==
Coca Castle stands on the outskirts of the town of Coca, about 45 kilometers (30 miles) to the north of Segovia. It is one of the few Spanish castles that have not been constructed on hilltops, having been built at the edge of a plain, overlooking a meander of the River Voltoya, a tributary of River Eresma. The castle is fortified by a deep, wide moat.

Coca, which is the birthplace of the Roman Emperor Theodosius I, has been inhabited since the second century BC when the Arevaci arrived and settled here.

== Ownership ==
Coca castle was owned by the well-known Spanish aristocratic family the House of Alba de Tormes (sometimes known as the House of Alba) until the mid-twentieth century. They handed over the property to Ministry of Agriculture in 1954. It has been declared a Spanish National Monument and is under protection.

== Construction and architecture ==
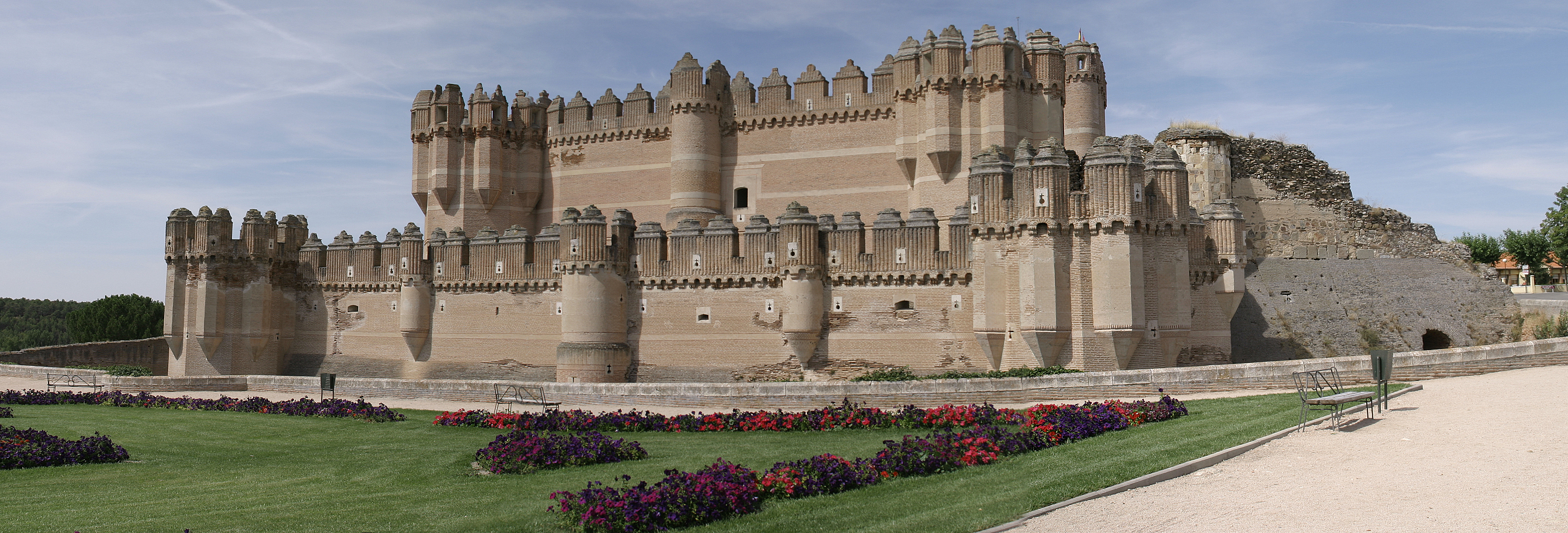

The castle was constructed under the supervision of a Moorish architect and engineer. Such Moorish engineers were routinely commissioned to construct large buildings during the medieval times and were called "Alarife" (one who understand the art of construction). Brick was used for most of the construction. However, the bricks used in the castle are different from ordinary bricks used to build houses. These are hardened bricks that are capable of withstanding enemy onslaught during sieges. The bricks were laid smooth with the mortar, so the lines of the brickwork are clearly visible along with the mortar. This created a distinctive pattern on the castle. The castle was constructed in classic Mudéjar fashion. Brickwork and plaster work was used to create geometrical patterns depicting a hybrid of Moorish Muslim and Christian Gothic architecture. While the main construction is of brick, limestone and plaster were used in the balistraria and embrasures. White limestone was also used to decorate columns in the courtyard and the keep, as well as numerous other features on the facade of the keep.

== Design and fortifications ==
The ground plan of the castle is rectangular, and it has a three-tiered defence system consisting of wall circuits enclosed within a moat and a central keep. The central keep is situated in the northern part of the castle and is known as the Tower of Homage. There are two curtain walls that enclose the enceinte, but the outer curtain wall is not intact. Today there are traces of the outer curtain wall, as well as a number of towers – some in ruins others standing – that mark the boundary where the outer moat circled the castle. All of the outer towers were rectangular in shape. The second curtain wall has a gate near the inner keep with a high brick arch enclosed by a geometric border, the alfiz, which is a classic Moorish design feature. The inner curtain wall has several towers and a talus as well. It has centered cylindrical towers on each side and smaller turrets between them, while the talus is constructed all the way down to the moat.

The towers on the corners of the walls are rectangular. The surviving wall is machicolated. This coupled with the talus served as a formidable defence. The battlements on the walls have been constructed as both ornament and as defensive fortifications, so they have been built with crests that jut out from the walls. Brickwork in Mudejar has been used here as well.

== History ==
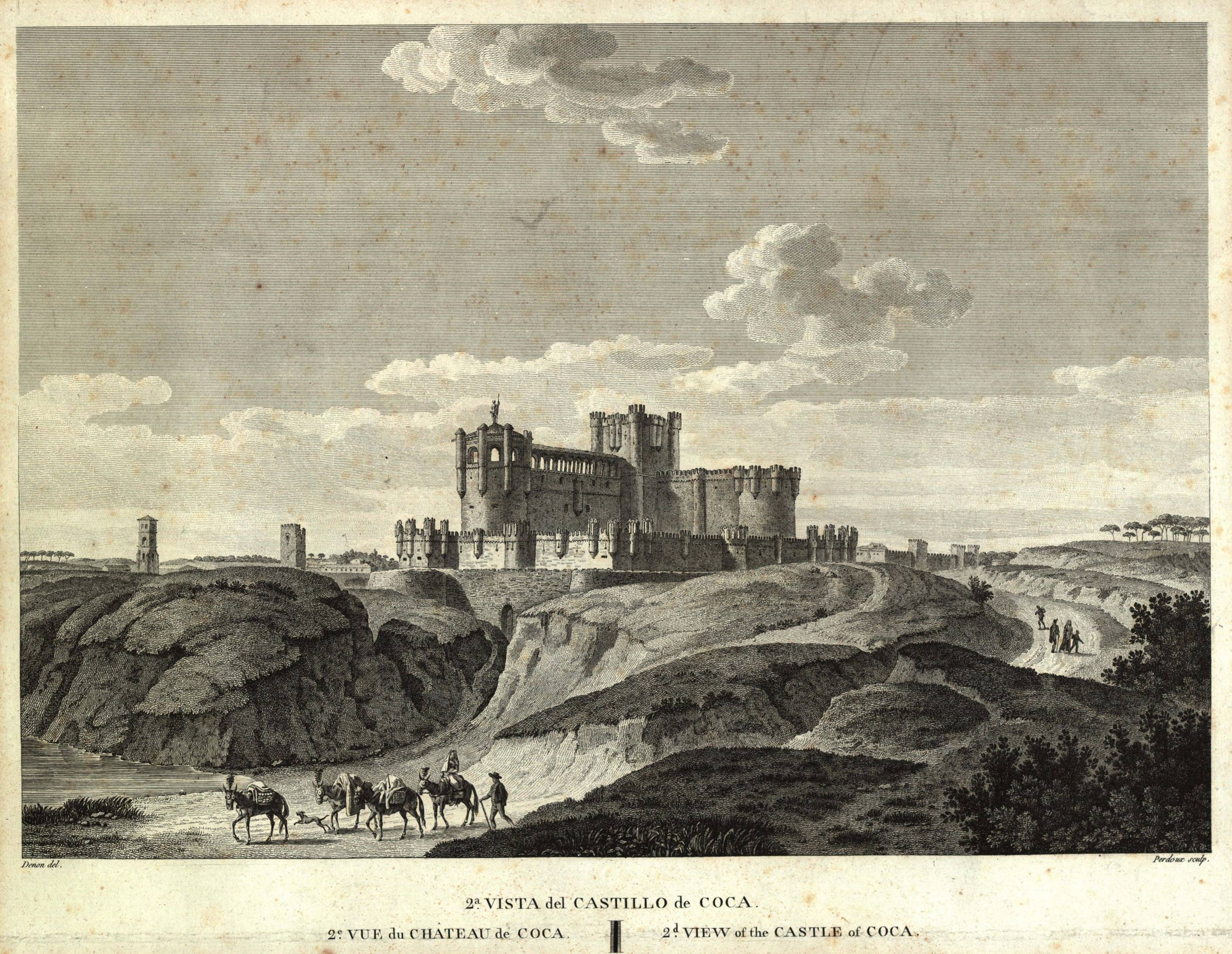
Engraving of the castle in the early nineteenth century by Vivant Denon

=== Early history ===
The oldest settlements in Coca date back to the Chalcolithic era, around 2,500–2,300 BC. The abundance of natural water and the geographical features were important for early settlers. In the fifth century AD, the village grew substantially, forming the historic city of Coca. The town of Coca was first established during Roman rule. It was called Cauca at that time. In 1439 Coca came under the control of Marquis of Santillana. In 1451 negotiations between Santillana and Fonseca families started. These would later culminate in 1453 with Coca being exchanged for Saldaña. Construction of the Coca Castle began as soon as the treaty was ratified by Juan II.

=== Medieval history ===
Alonso de Fonseca y Avellaneda has been credited with the construction of the castle. The castle was built under the supervision of a master builder and most of the work had been completed by 1493. In 1502 it was decreed that castle and the town could only be passed down to male heirs, so after Alonso's death it passed on to Antonio de Fonseca. In 1512 a number of extra ornamental features were added to the keep and the castle exterior under the supervision of engineers. The castle came under attack during the Revolt of the Comuneros in 1521. Communeras troops attacked the castle in retaliation to the burning of Medina del Campo. Medina del Campo had been previously attacked by the Royalists as it housed a large number of artillery pieces, and it had subsequently been razed after Royalists met heavy resistance. In 1645, Gaspar Alfonso Pérez de Guzmán, 9th Duke of Medina Sidonia was accused to treachery after he instigated the Andalusian independentist conspiracy of 1641, and was imprisoned in the castle.

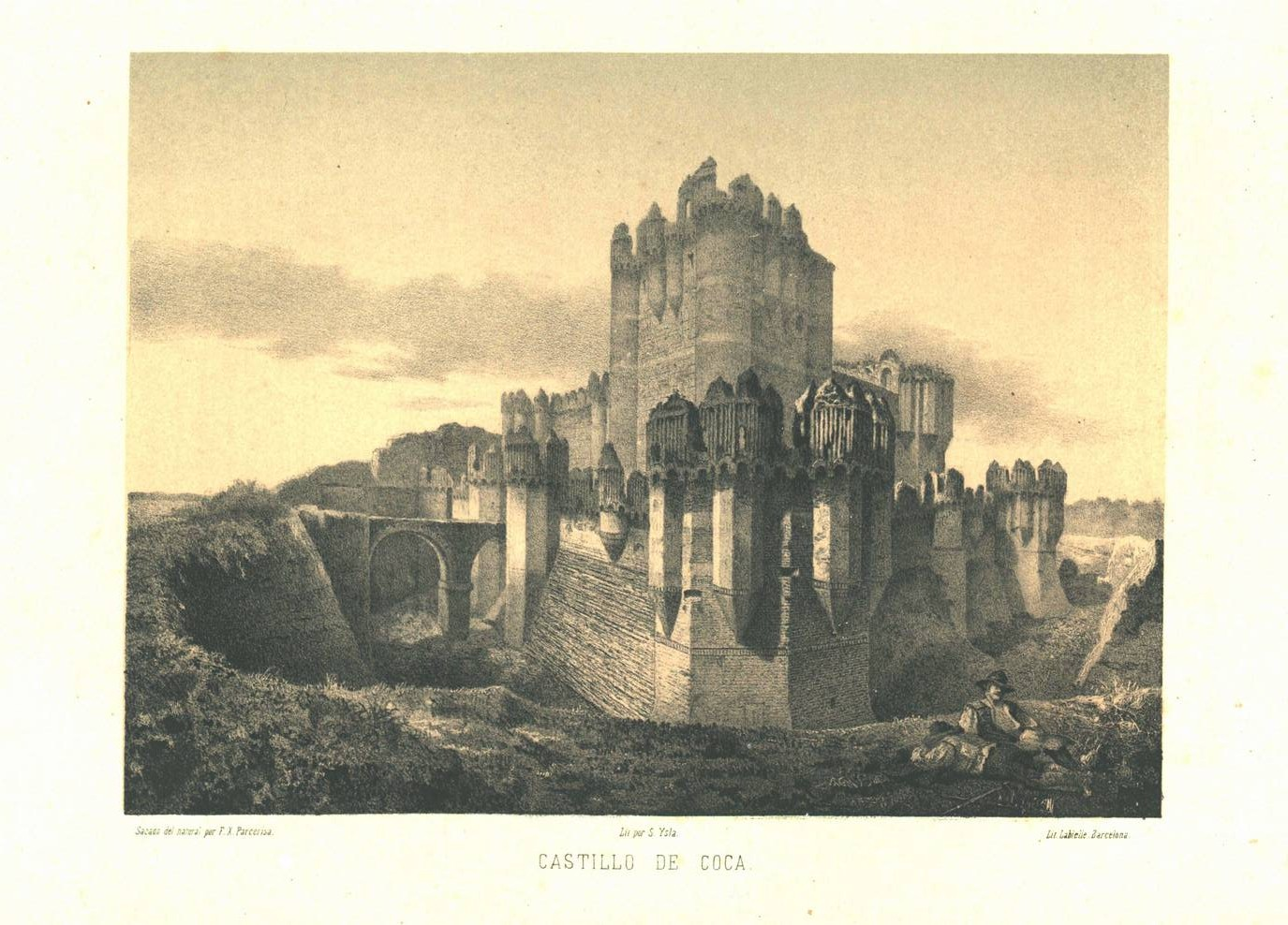
Coca Castle, an 1865 engraving by Francisco Javier Parcerisa

The castle went through a period of repairs and renovations from the sixteenth to the eighteenth century AD. Most notable among these renovations was the addition of the Patio de Armas in sixteenth century, the construction of a gallery between the Keep (Torres del Homenaje) and Pedro Mata Tower in the seventeenth century AD and the extensive renovations of 1715. After 1730 the castle suffered a long period of neglect that led to it falling into disrepair, and subsequently many important artifacts were either lost or destroyed. During the Peninsular War, Coca Castle was captured by the French, who occupied the castle in 1808 and vacated it in 1812. During these four years the castle further deteriorated and much of it fell into ruin. The French troops were, obviously, not concerned with the upkeep of the castle and many ornamental features fell into ruin during this time. Another incident that led to the castle falling further into ruin was the 1828 sale of materials by the administrator of the castle. As the castle was under the ownership of the House of Alba at that time, the owners tore away a number of columns, marble pieces and other ornamental features and sold them off to the highest bidder.

=== Modern history ===
Coca Castle was declared a national monument of Spain by Decree-Law on August 9, 1926. By the same decree, it was nationalized. The control of the castle itself and the adjoining land was taken over by the government of Spain from the House of Alba. No major restorative work was done until 1954 when state-sponsored repairs and renovations were started. The Ministry in charge of the castle wanted to restore it so that they could open a school of forestry training. The repair and renovation work was conducted under the supervision of the Spanish avant-garde architect Miguel de los Santos Nicolás. The team of architects, which included Francisco Pons Sorolla was given carte blanche by the General Directorate of Fine Arts. The renovations took four years and were completed in 1958. After the renovations the "Escuela de Capacitación Forestal" (Forestry school) was opened in 1958.

== Locations open to tourists ==
There are several rooms in Coca Castle that are open for tourists. These include the following:

=== Chapel ===
The ceiling of the chapel was destroyed in a fire during the French occupation of the castle. However it was restored later on and has now been completely renovated. There are various art objects present in the chapel that are of historic importance. These include:

- Byzantine Christ. Its painter is unknown, but the work dates to the fourteenth century. It is a unique piece as it depicts Christ with a halo instead of the crown of thorns.
- Two Flemish paintings. The artist is unknown, but these too date from the late fourteenth century. The larger one represents the Crucifixion and the small one the Annunciation.
- Tabernacle, of polychrome wood in Renaissance style, the carving to the right is of San Pedro (Saint Peter), one to the left of San Pablo (Paul the Apostle).
- Christ of ivory from the sixteenth century. The feet are shown to be nailed separately; he is not wounded in the side nor has the crown of thorns, but his head is inclined towards the left side.
- Two paintings of the Mary the Virgin. The first one is on the Altar; it is on traditional Gothic and dates to the fifteenth century. The second one, a Romanesque is on a limestone pedestal with the coat of arms of Castile displayed as well.

=== Weapons room ===
The armory is also open to public viewing. It contains metal armor and weapons belonging to the fifteenth, sixteenth and seventeenth centuries. The furniture displayed in the armory is original and dates back to the fifteenth and sixteenth century AD. Most of it is made from walnut wood, with bone and ivory columns.

=== Central keep ===
Also known as the Torre del Homenaje, it contains the Gallery and the 25-meter high tower. The circuitry walkway 'Paseo de Ronda' is also connected to the keep. It contains the defensive structures that were used in active defence such as pulleys and oil smelters.

=== Rebuilt portions ===
Columns from the balustrade were sold off by the administrators when the castle was in disrepair in order to pay for the upkeep. Eight of these were bought back from Olmedo and Iscar in 1952 for 35,000-40,000 pesetas, each. The balustrade has now been completely rebuilt identical to the original one.

Exterior of the Castle Coca

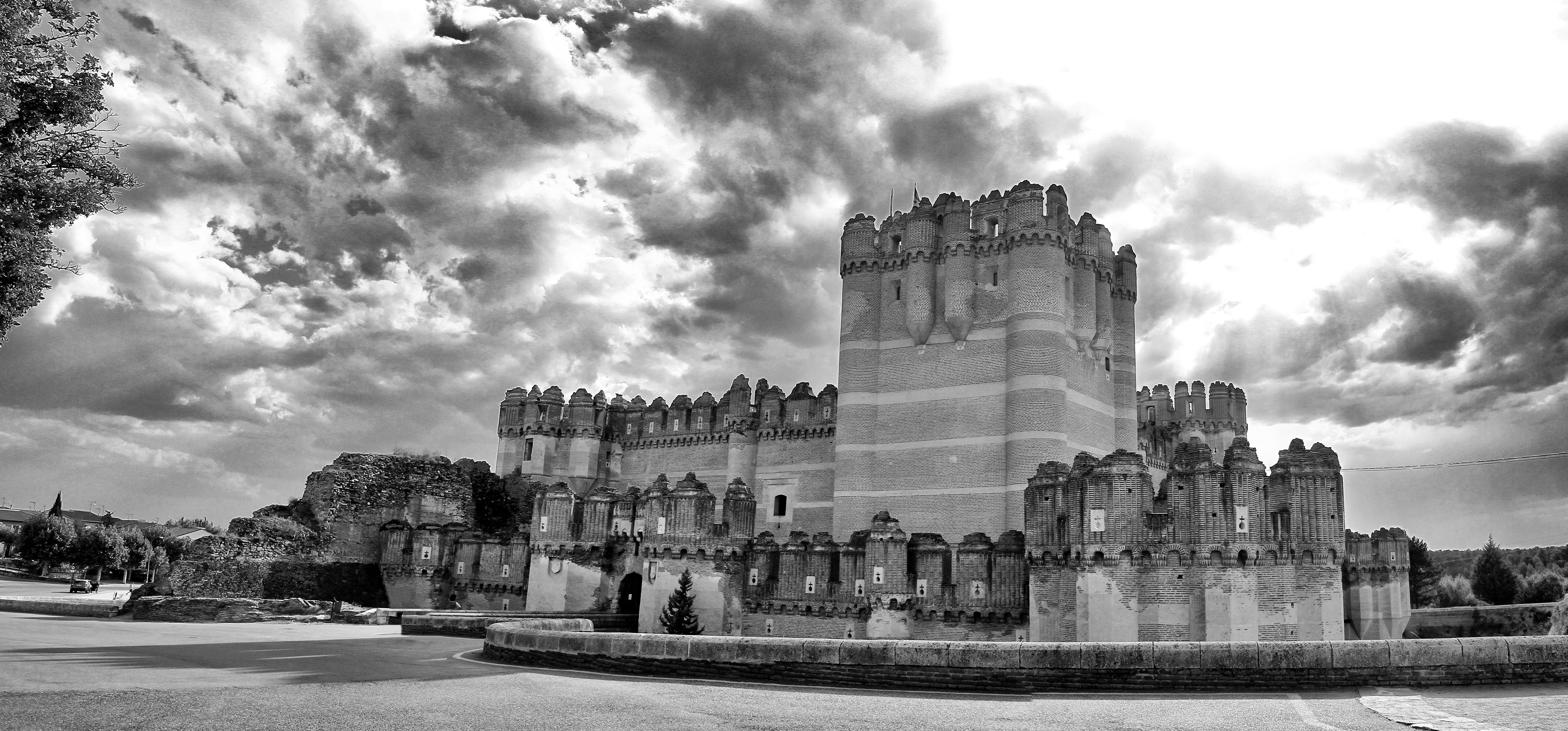

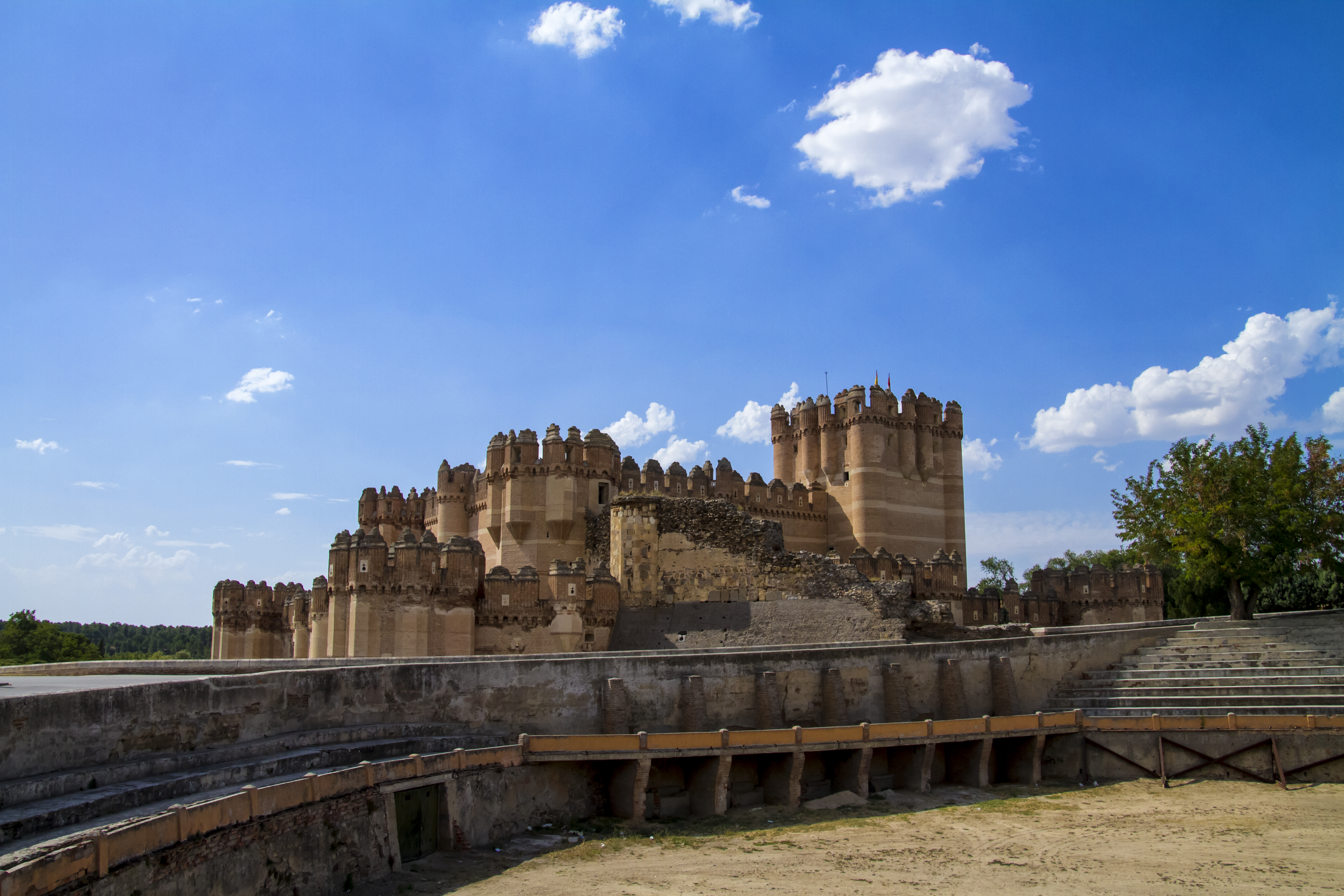

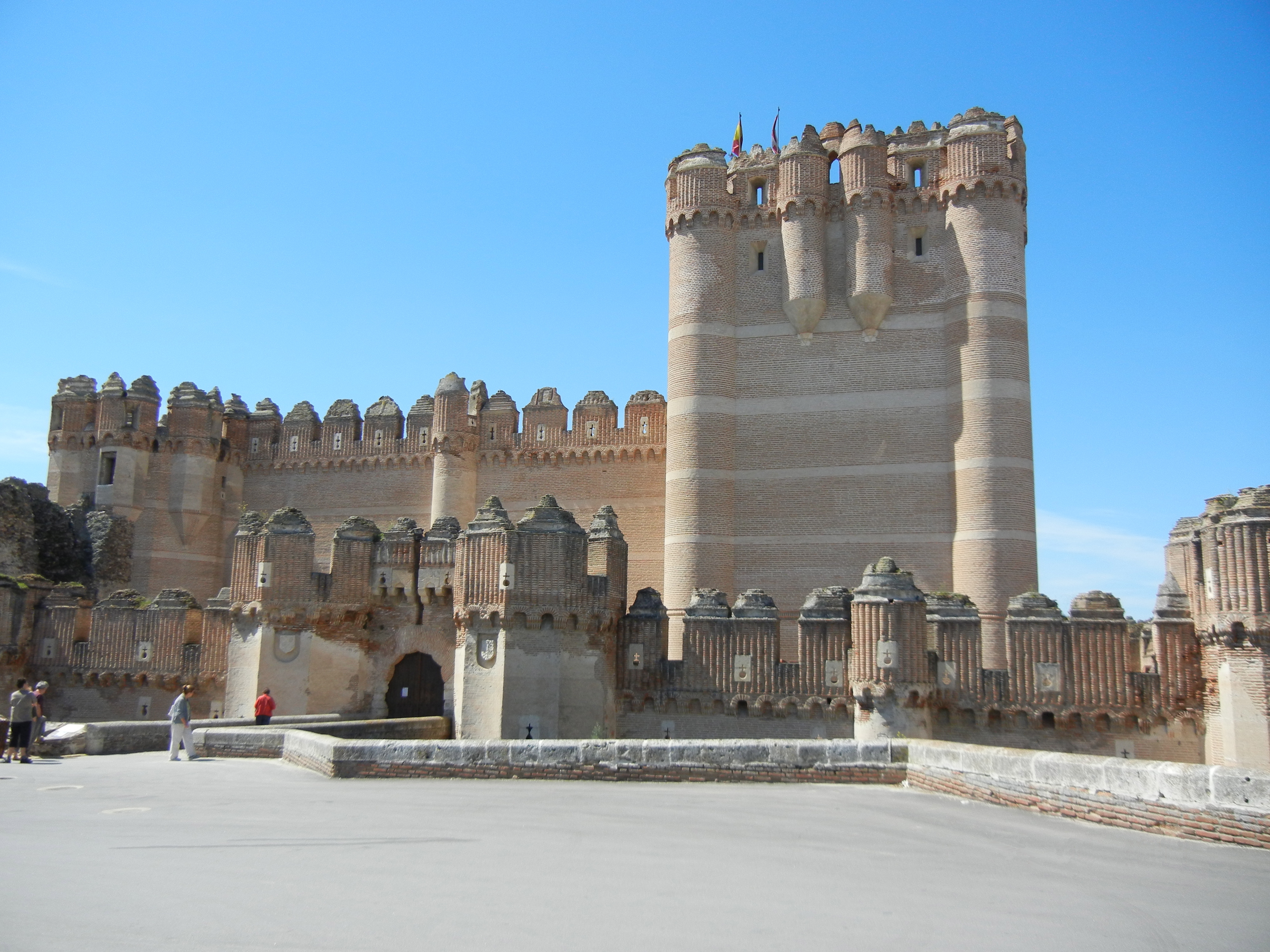

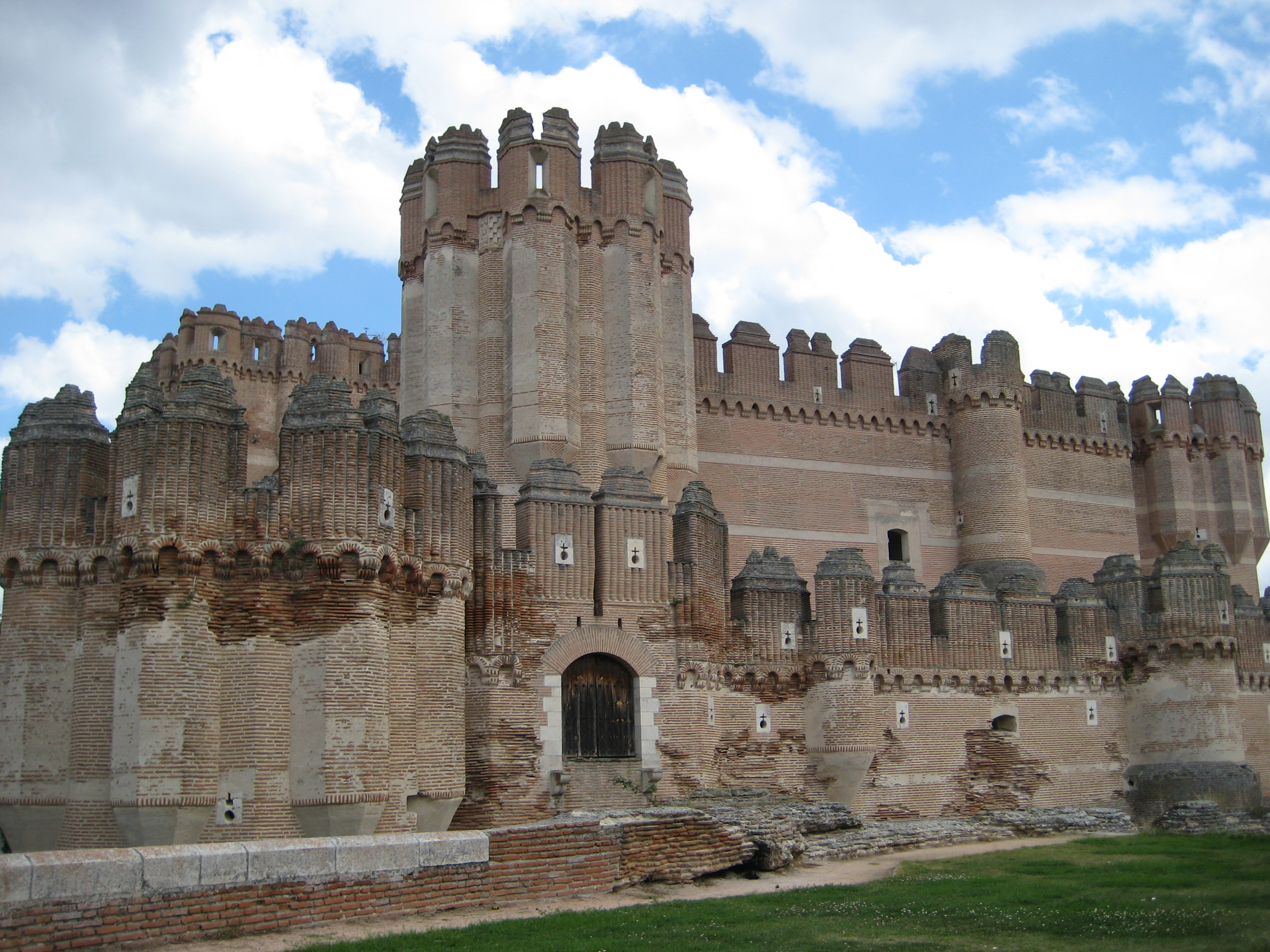

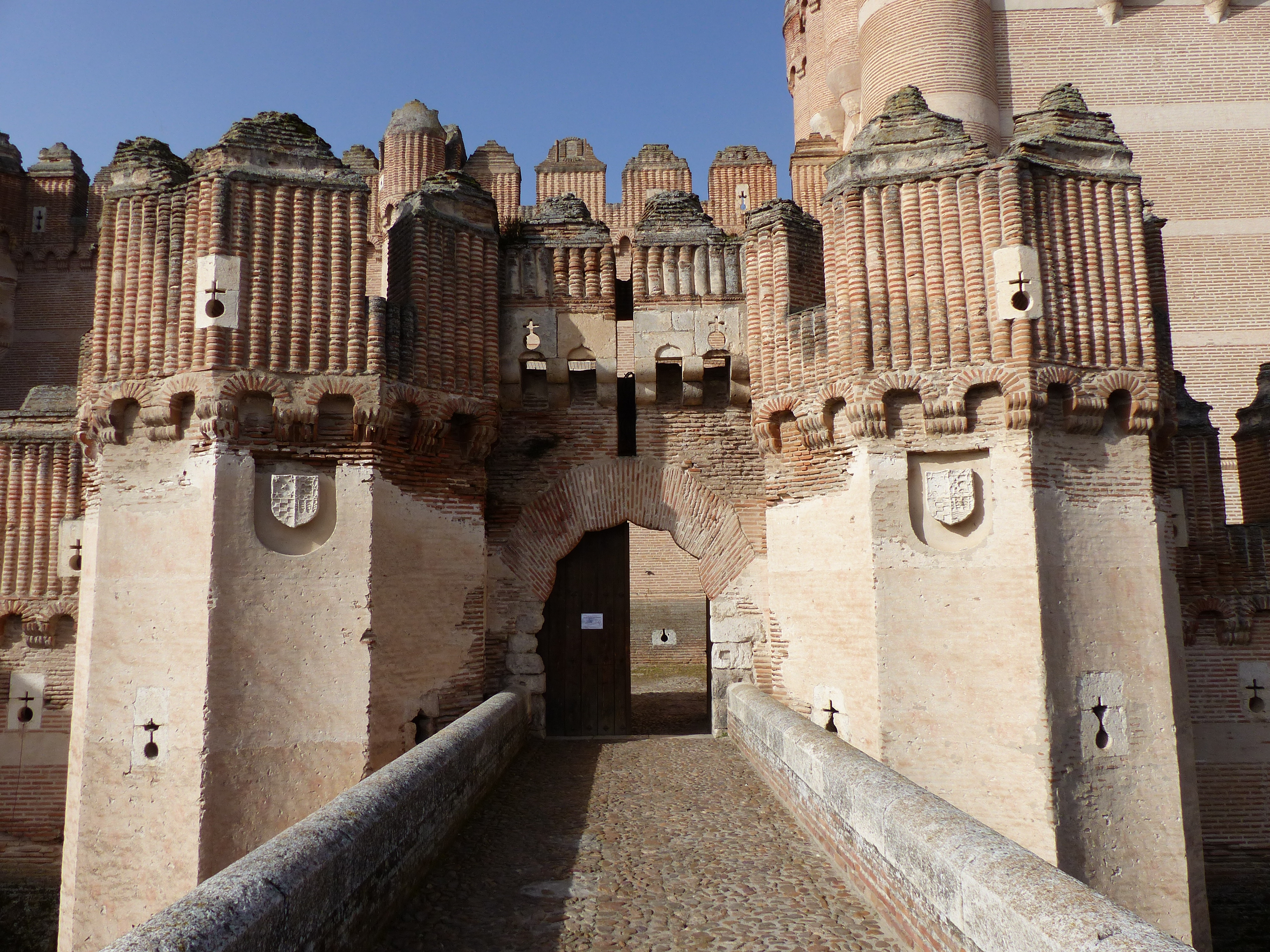
Interior of the Castle Coca

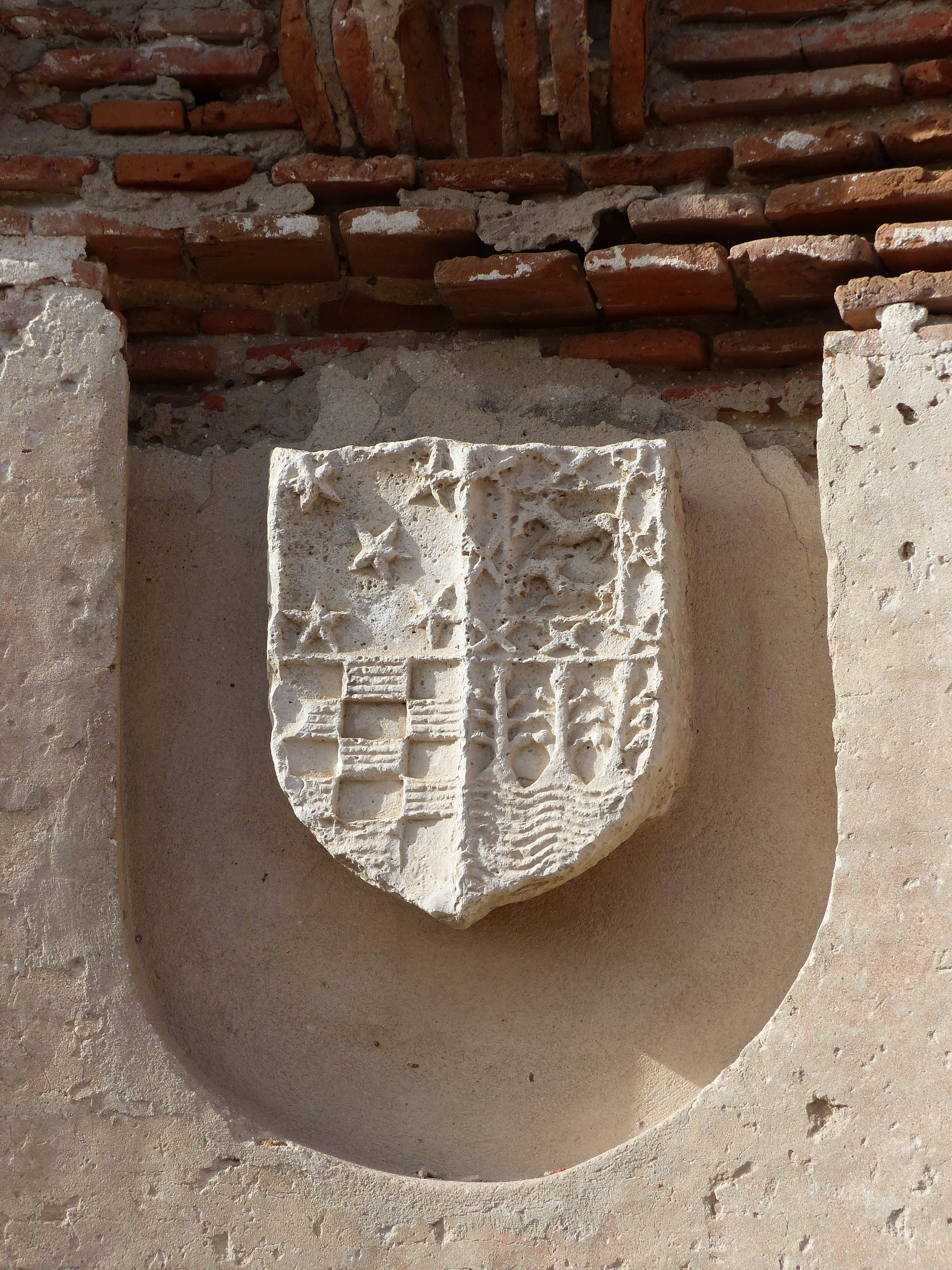

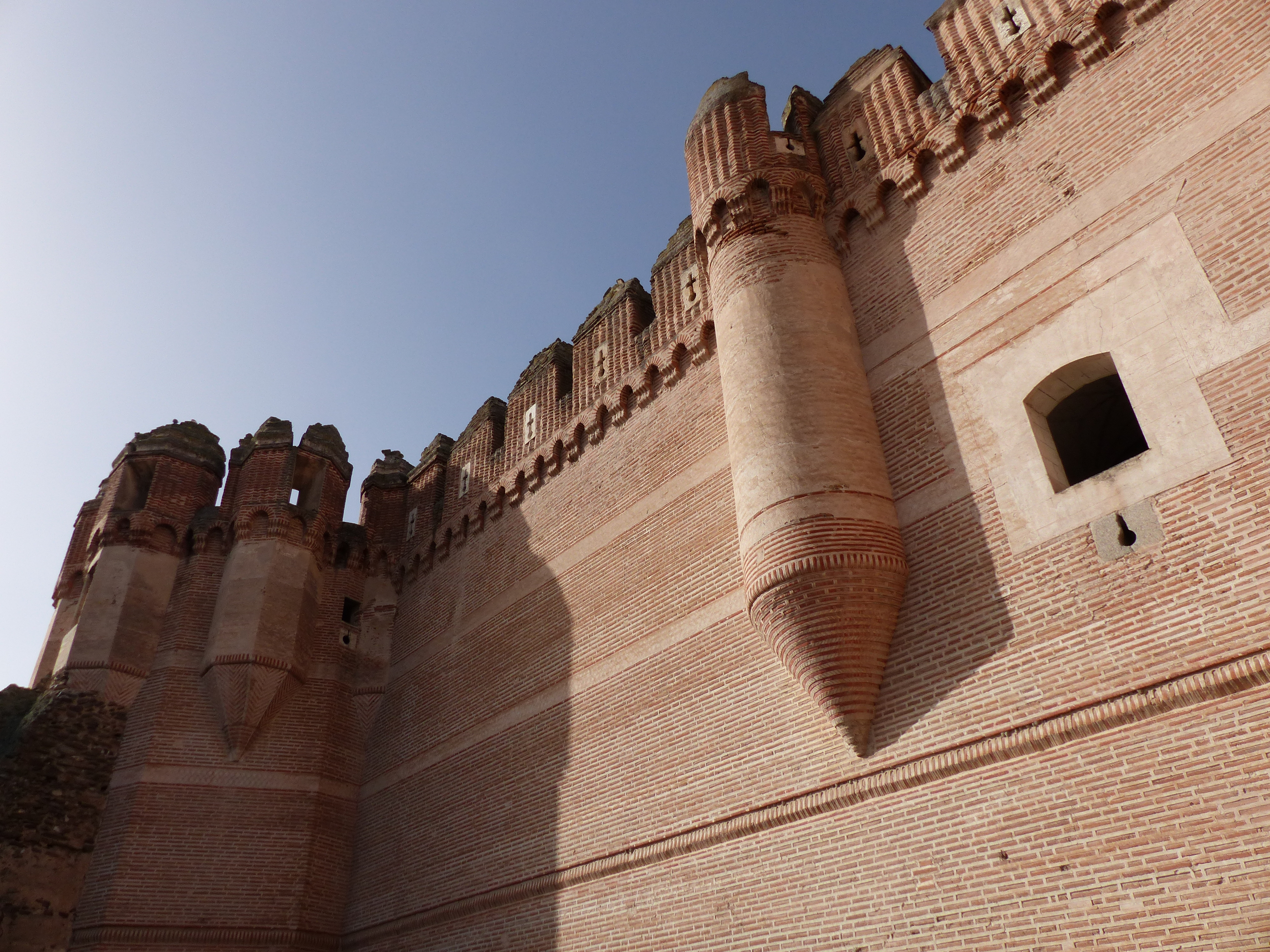

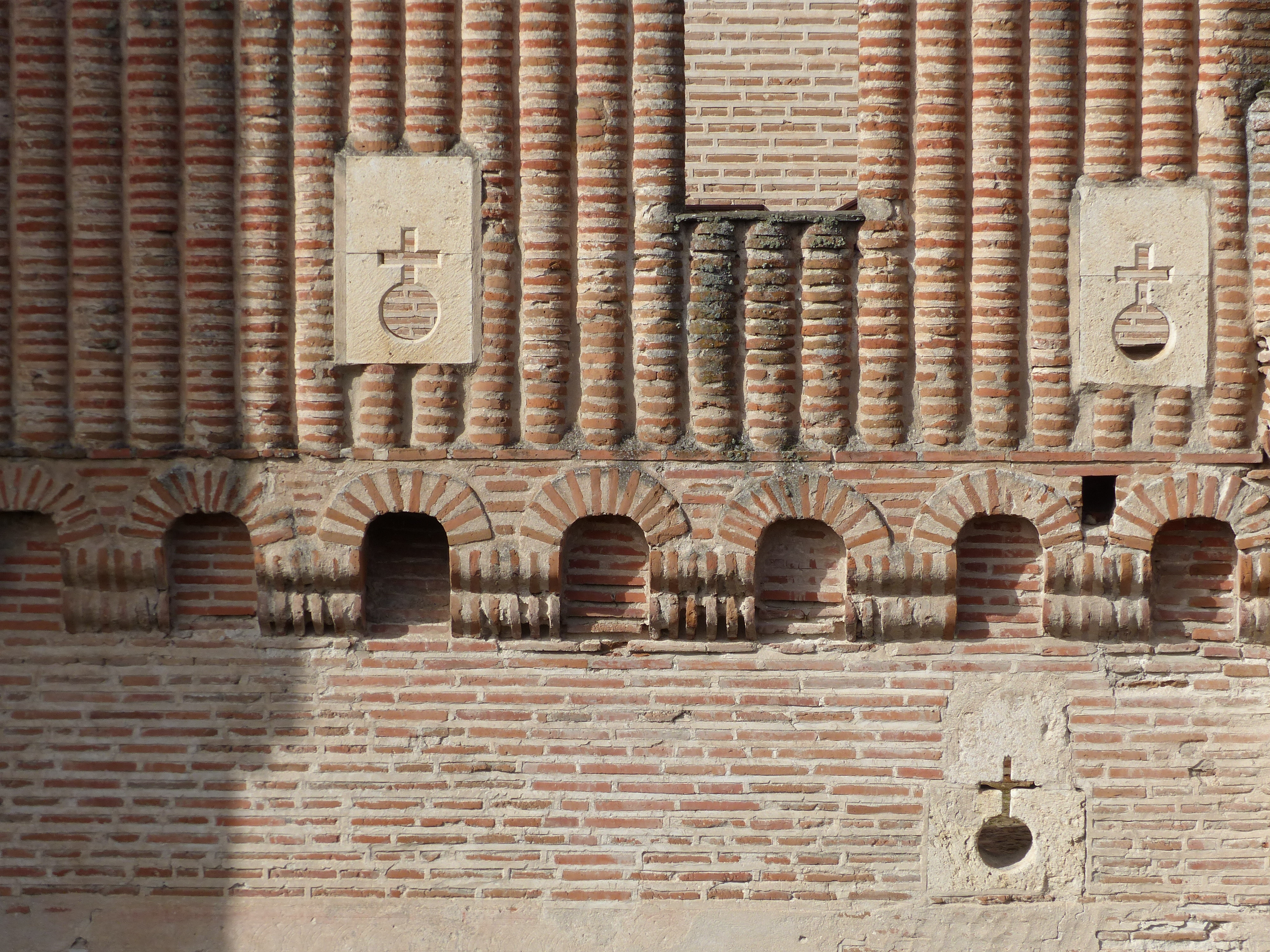

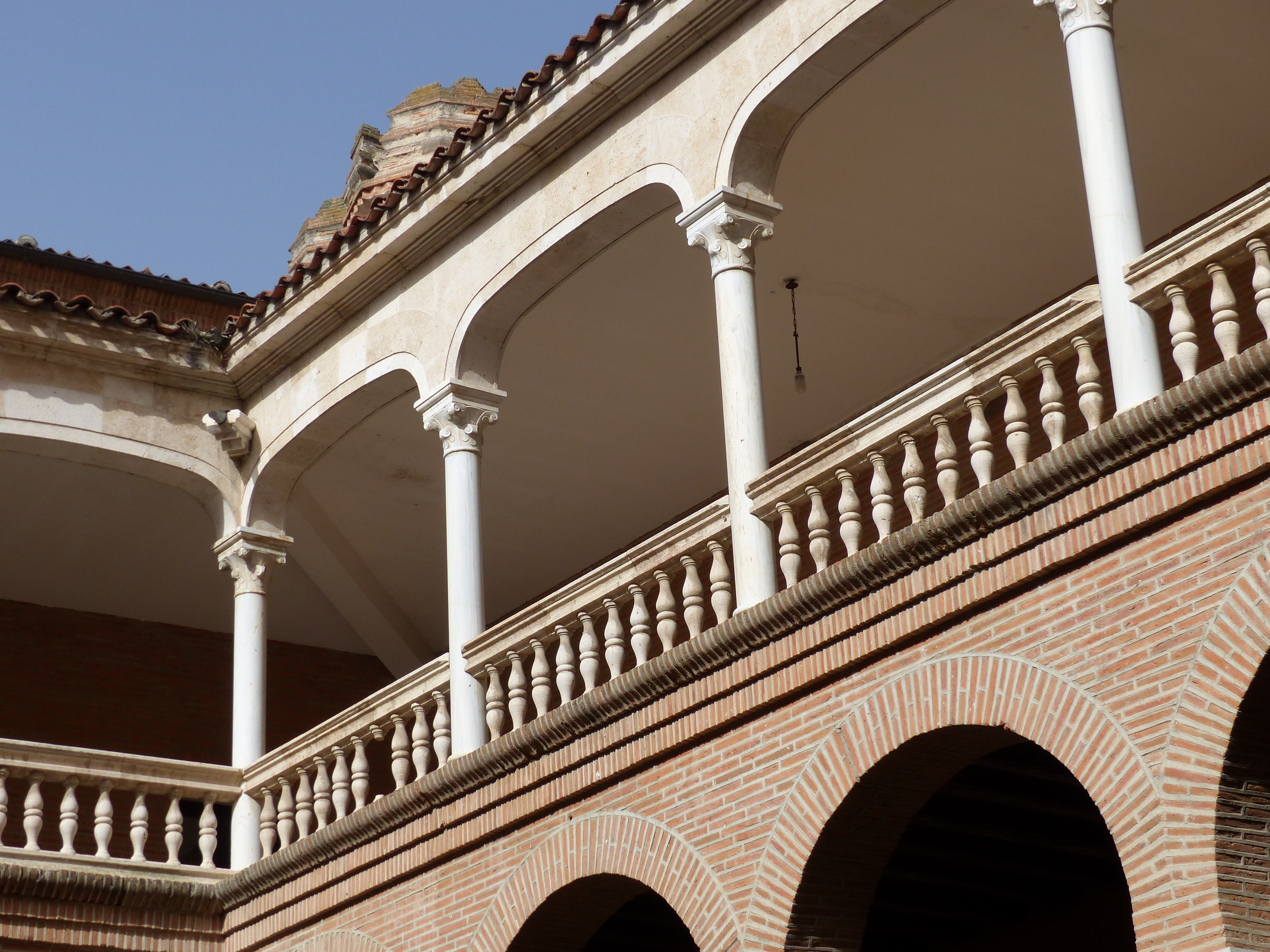

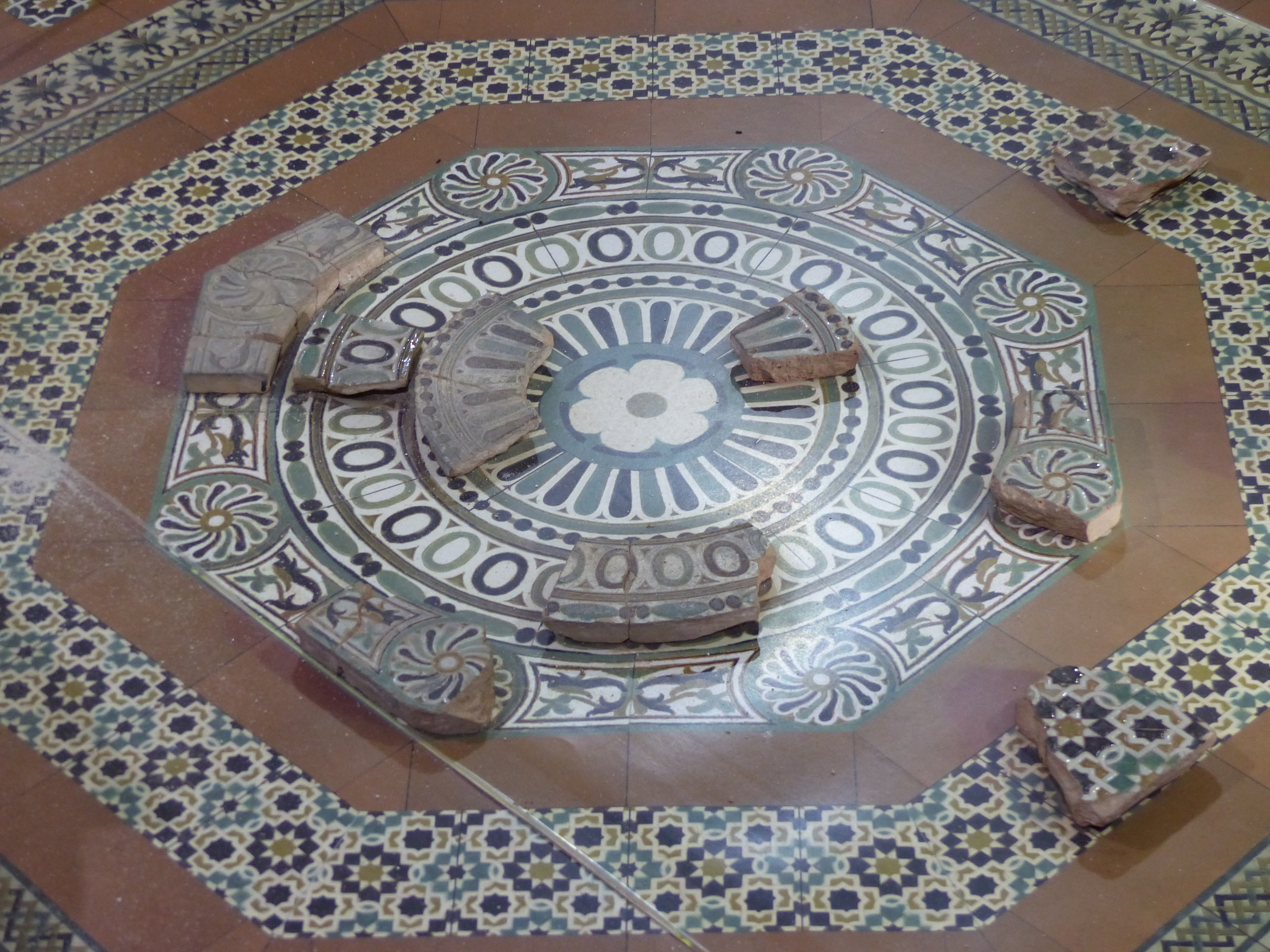

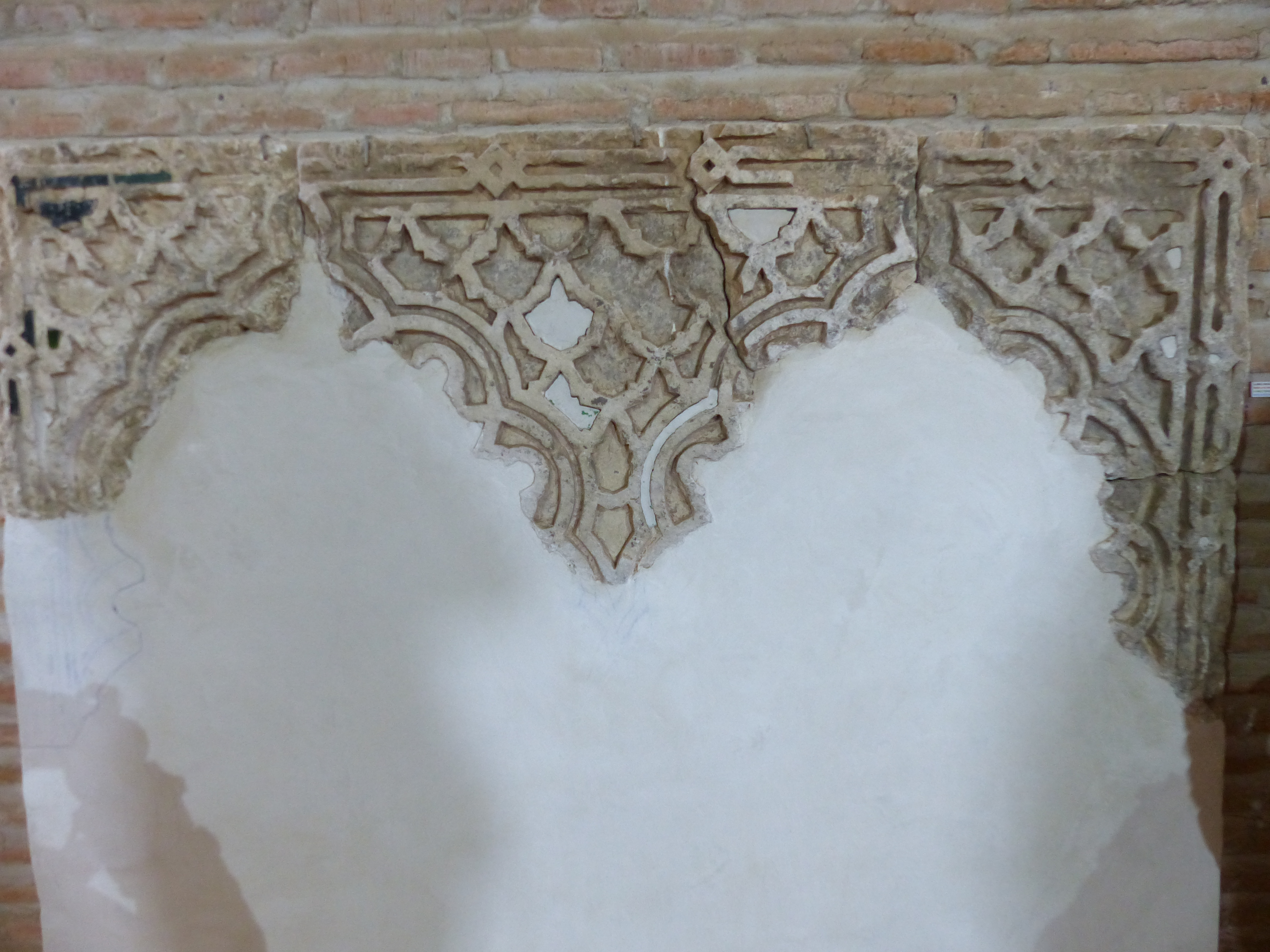

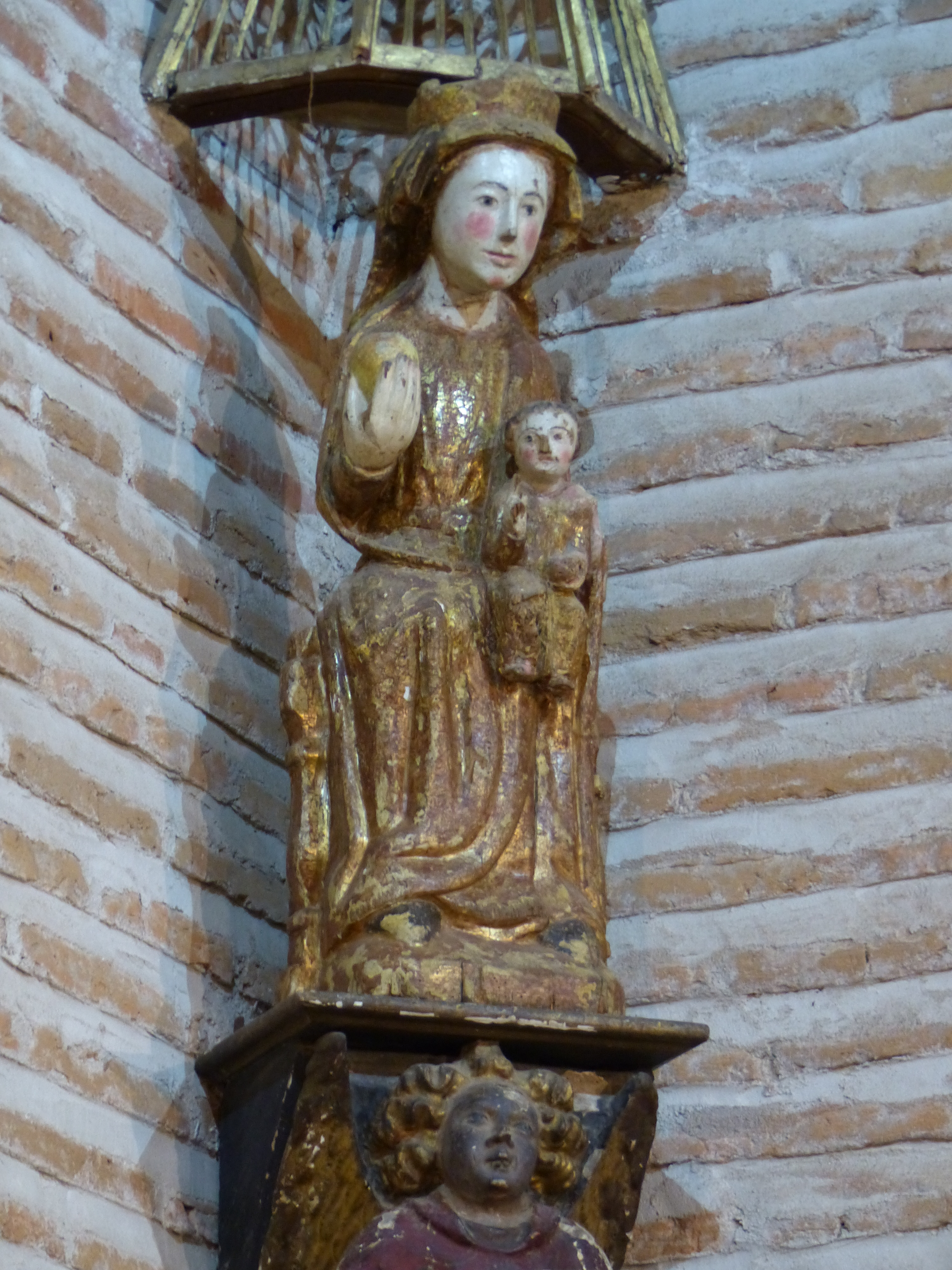

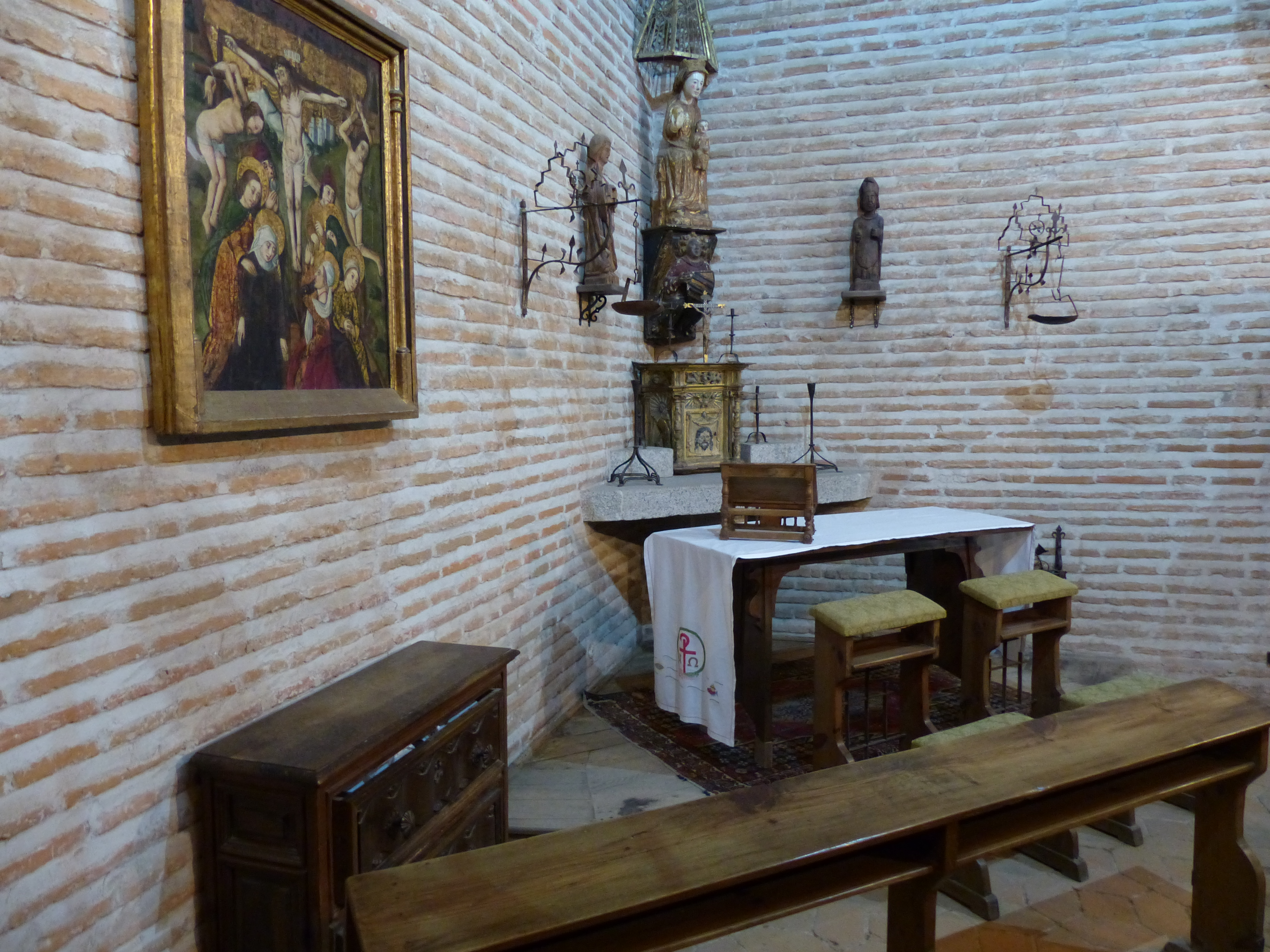

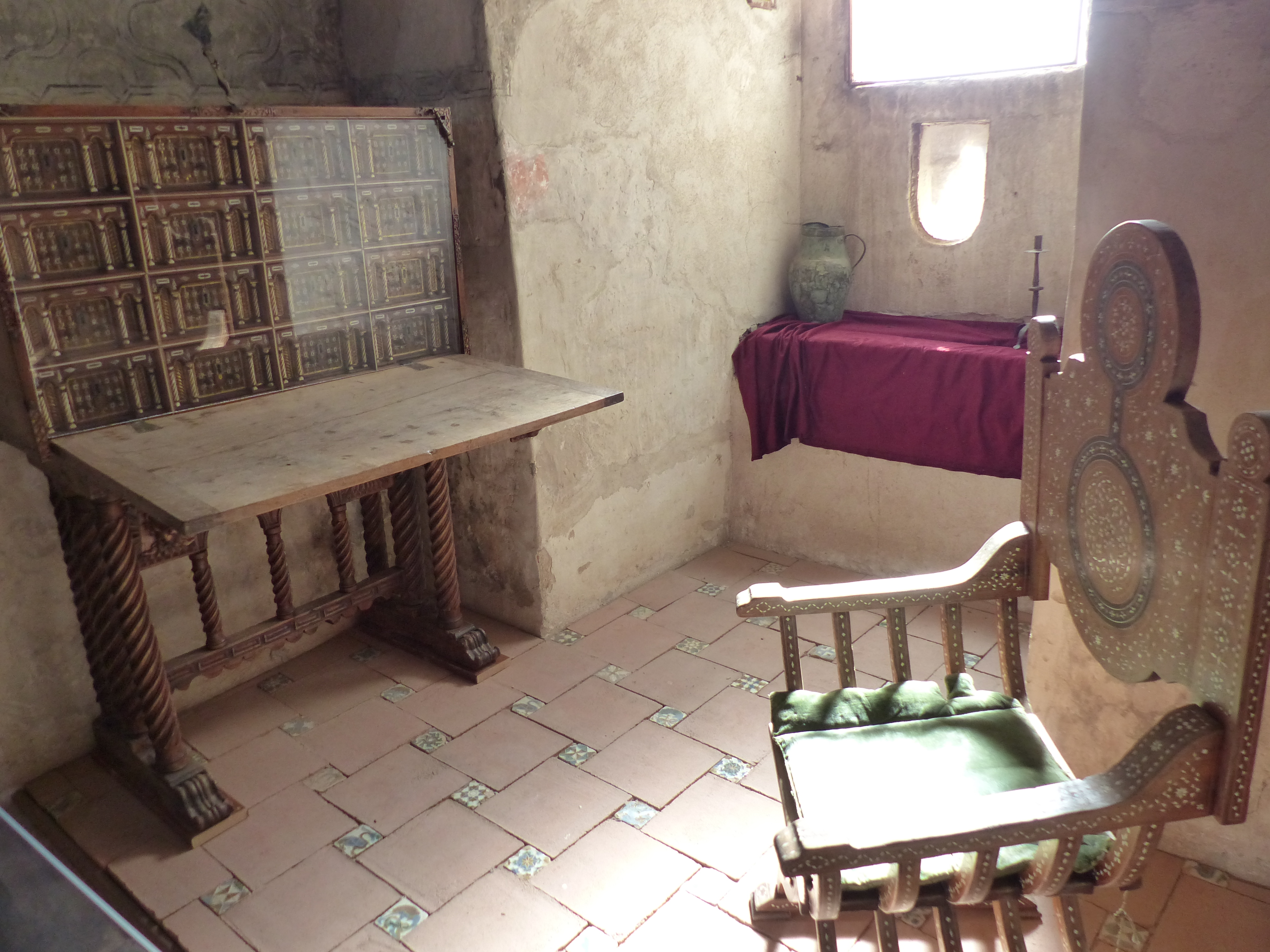

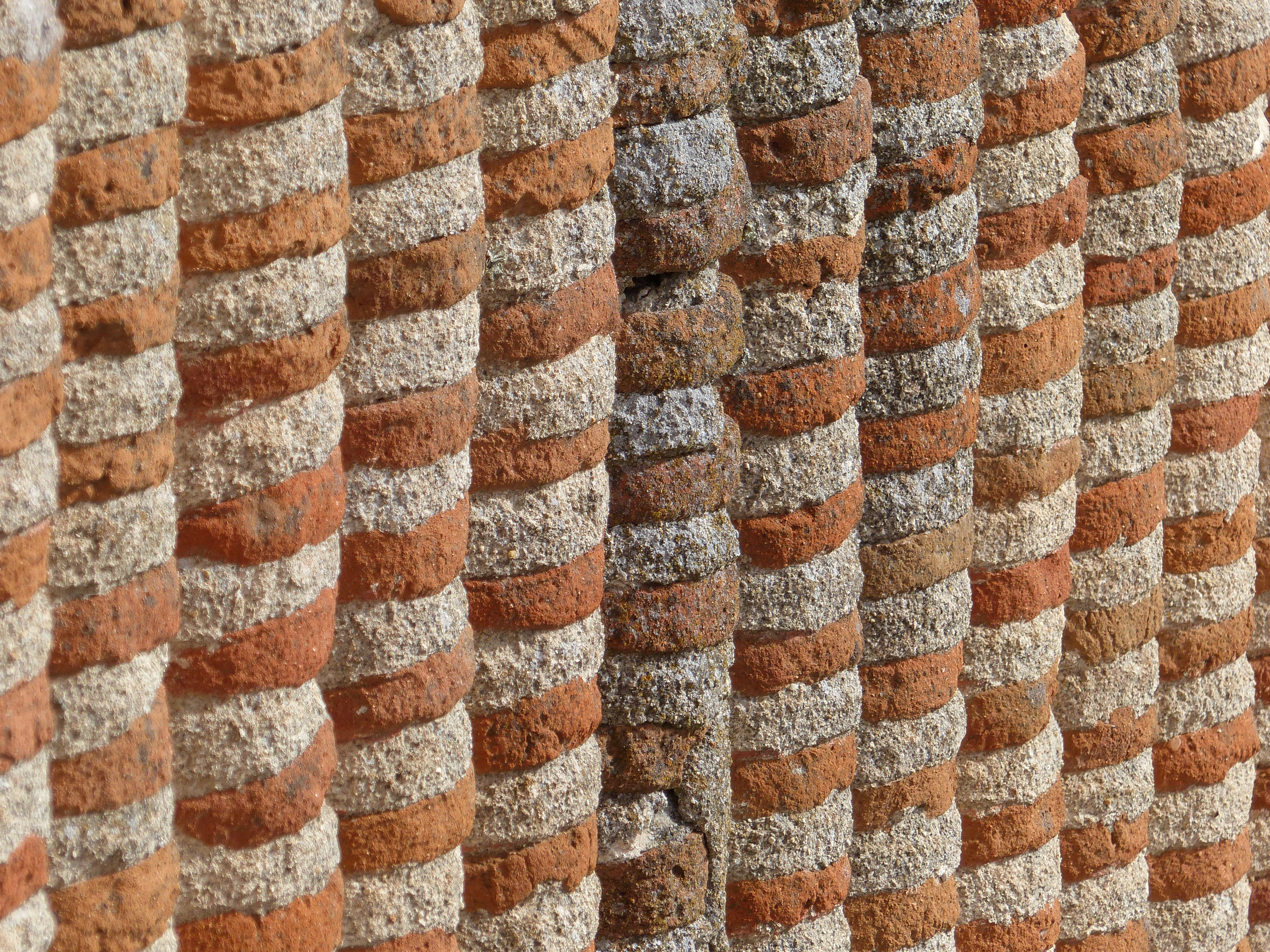

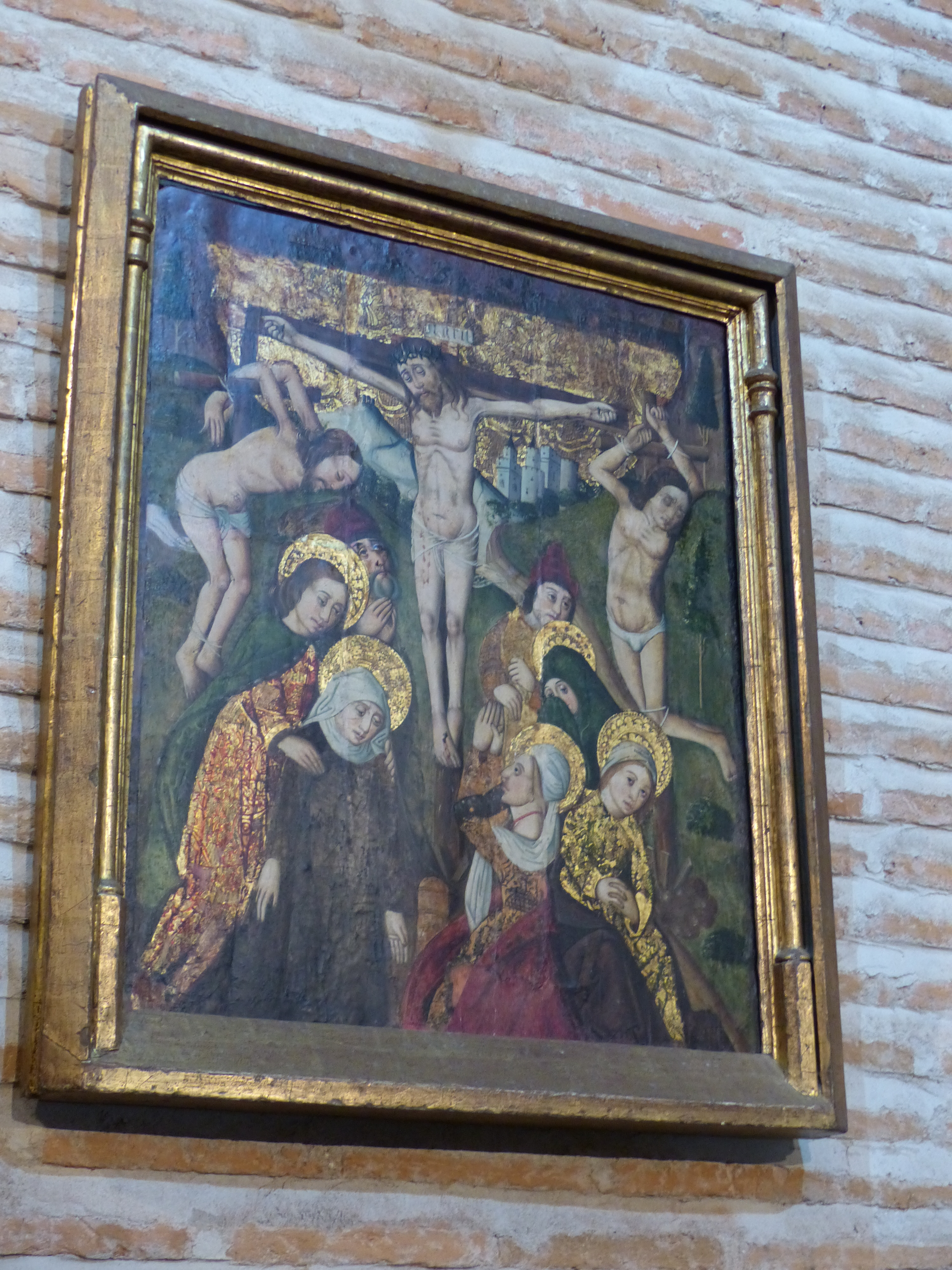

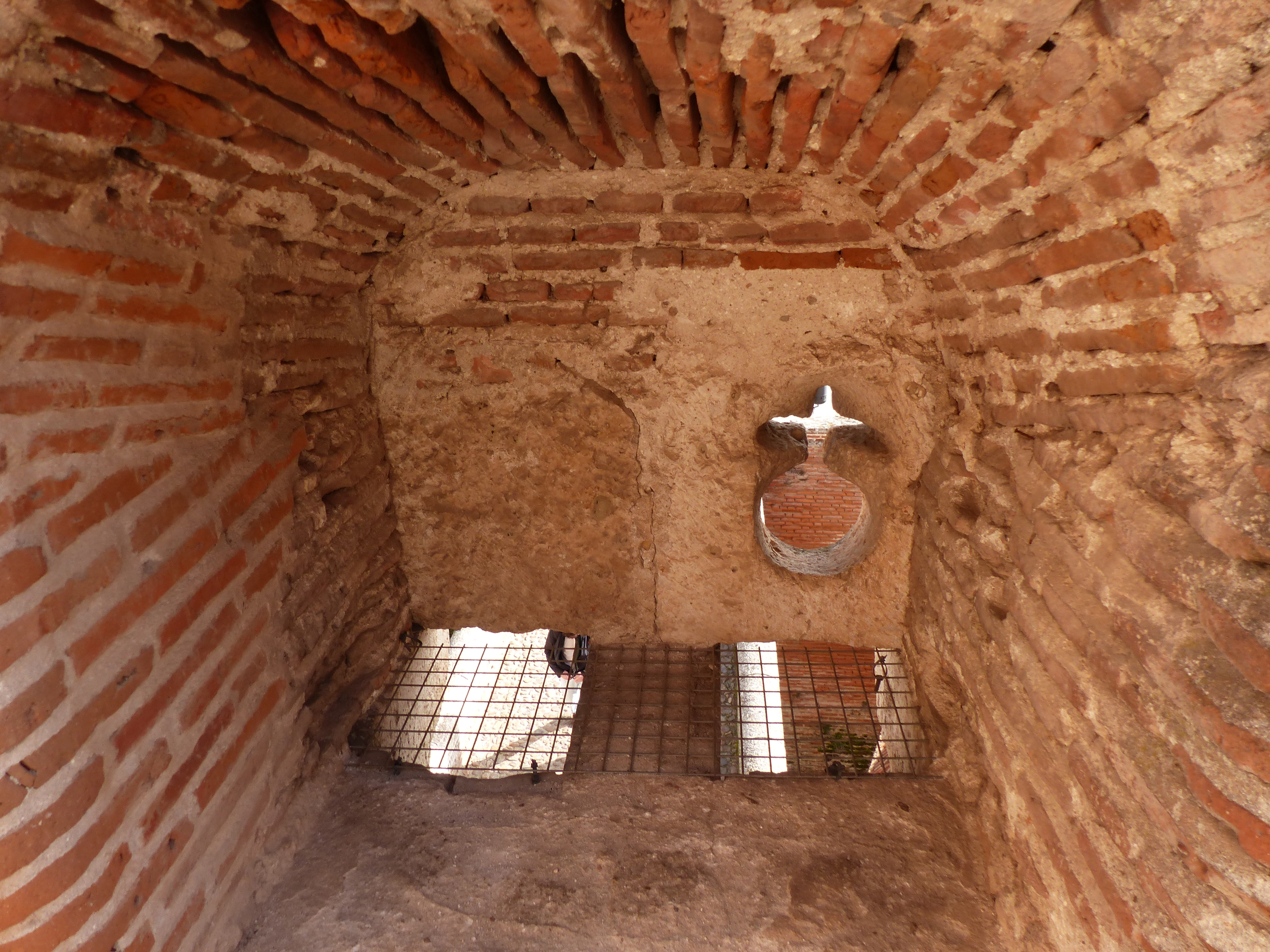

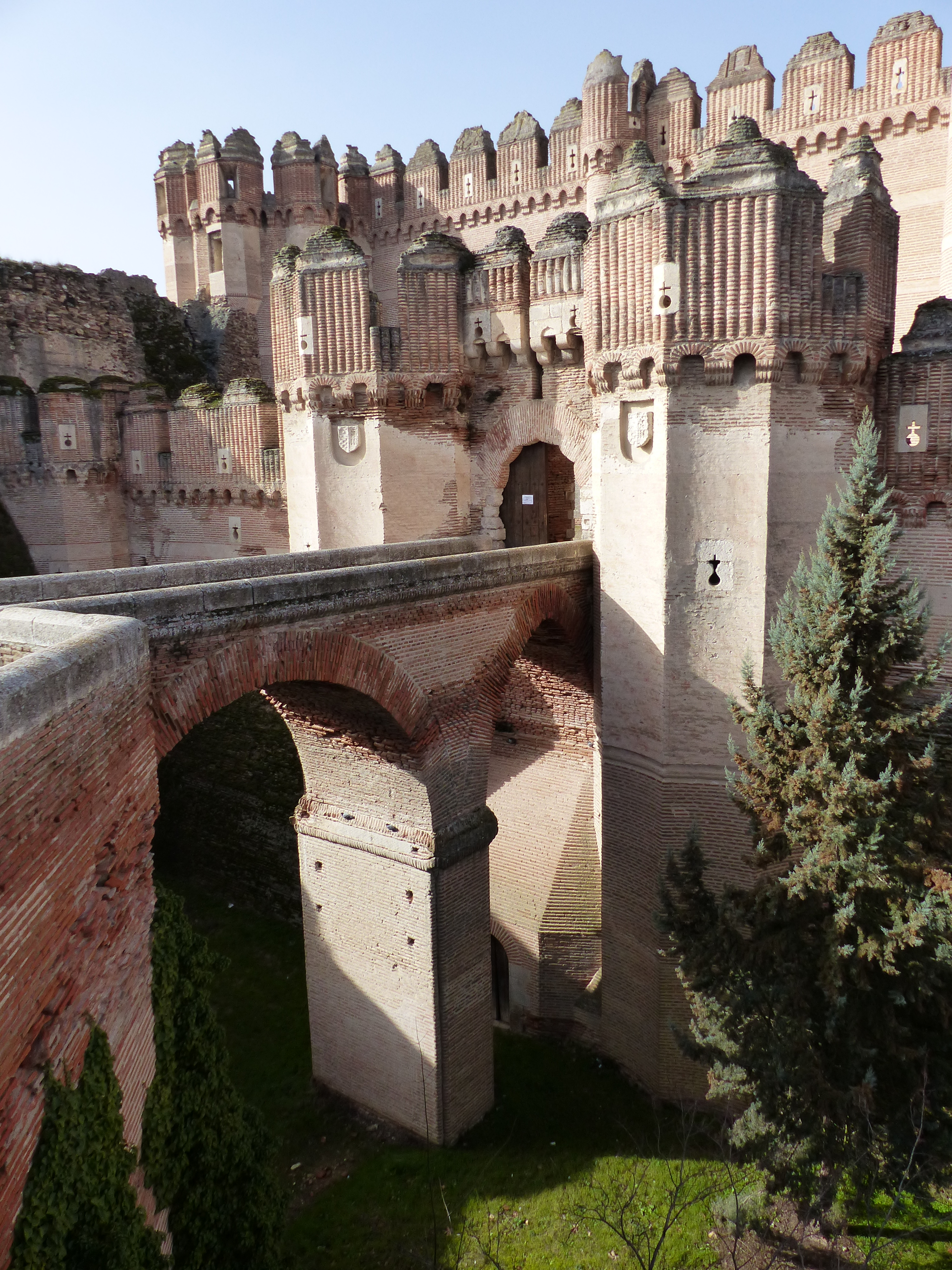

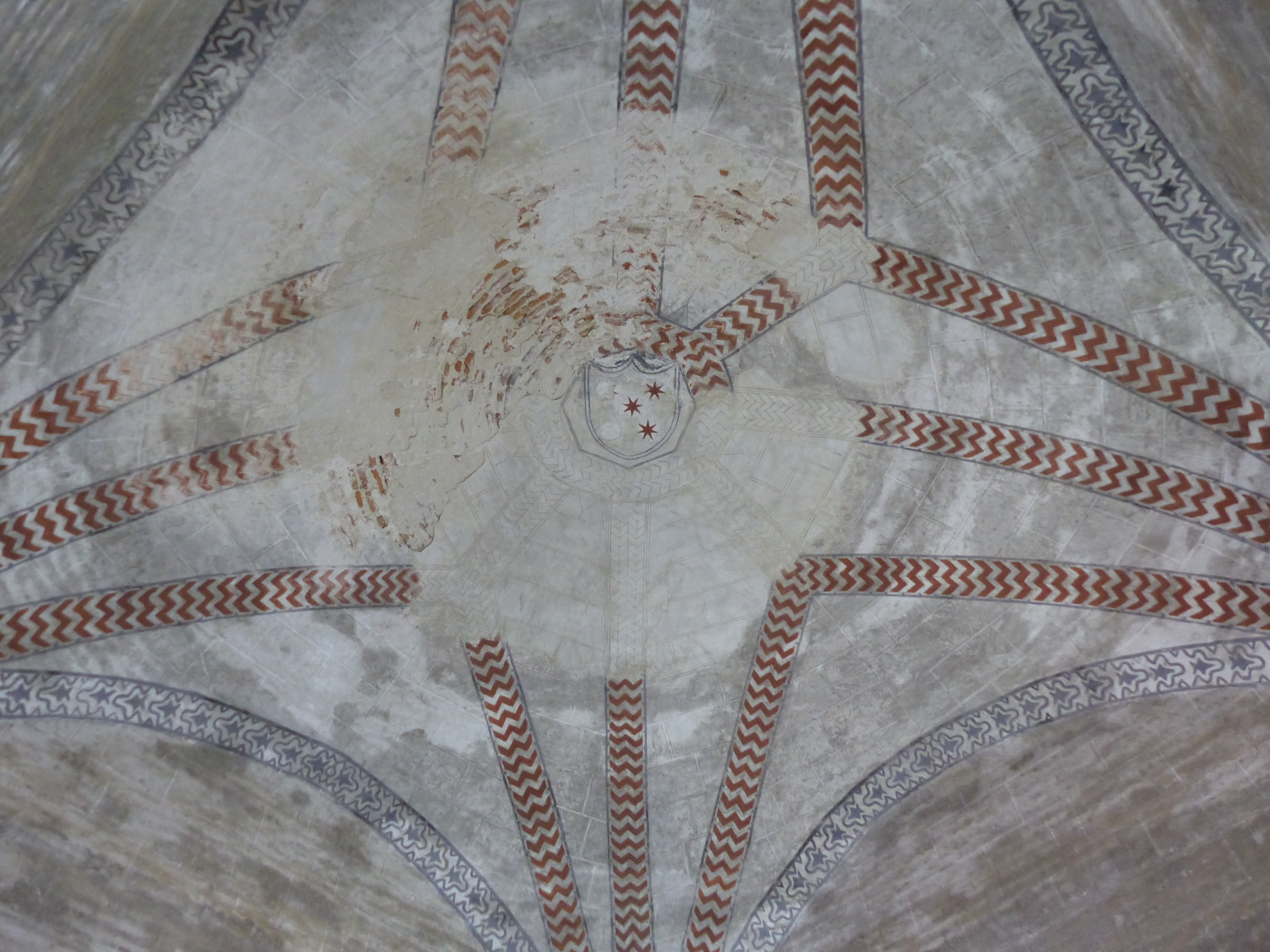
