= Coca, Segovia =

Coca
- Municipality
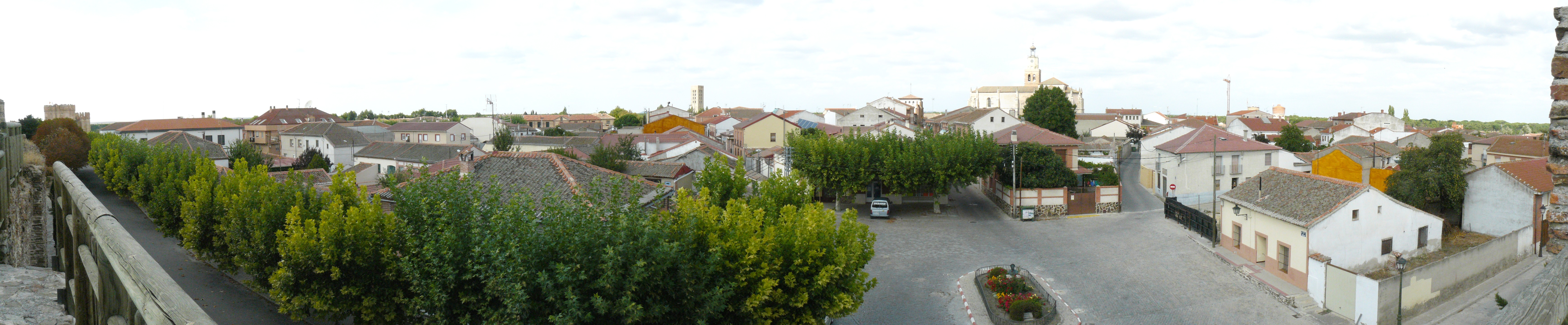

- Flag Coat of arms

- Location in Spain. Coca (Castile and León) Coca (Spain)
- Coordinates: 41°13′04″N 4°31′20″W
- Country: Spain
- Autonomous community: Castile and León
- Province: Segovia
- Municipality: Coca

Area
  - Total: 98.45 km^{2} (38.01 sq mi)
- Elevation: 785 m (2,575 ft)

Population (2025-01-01)
  - Total: 1,706
  - Density: 17.33/km^{2} (44.88/sq mi)
- Time zone: UTC+1 (CET)
  - Summer (DST): UTC+2 (CEST)
- Website: Official website

Coca is a municipality in the province of Segovia, central Spain, part of the autonomous community of Castile and Leon. It is located 50 kilometres northwest of the provincial capital city of Segovia, and 60 kilometres from Valladolid. Castillo de Coca, a 15th-century Mudéjar-style castle is located in the town. It was also the birthplace of Roman Emperor Theodosius I in 347 CE. The town had a population of 1741 in 2023.

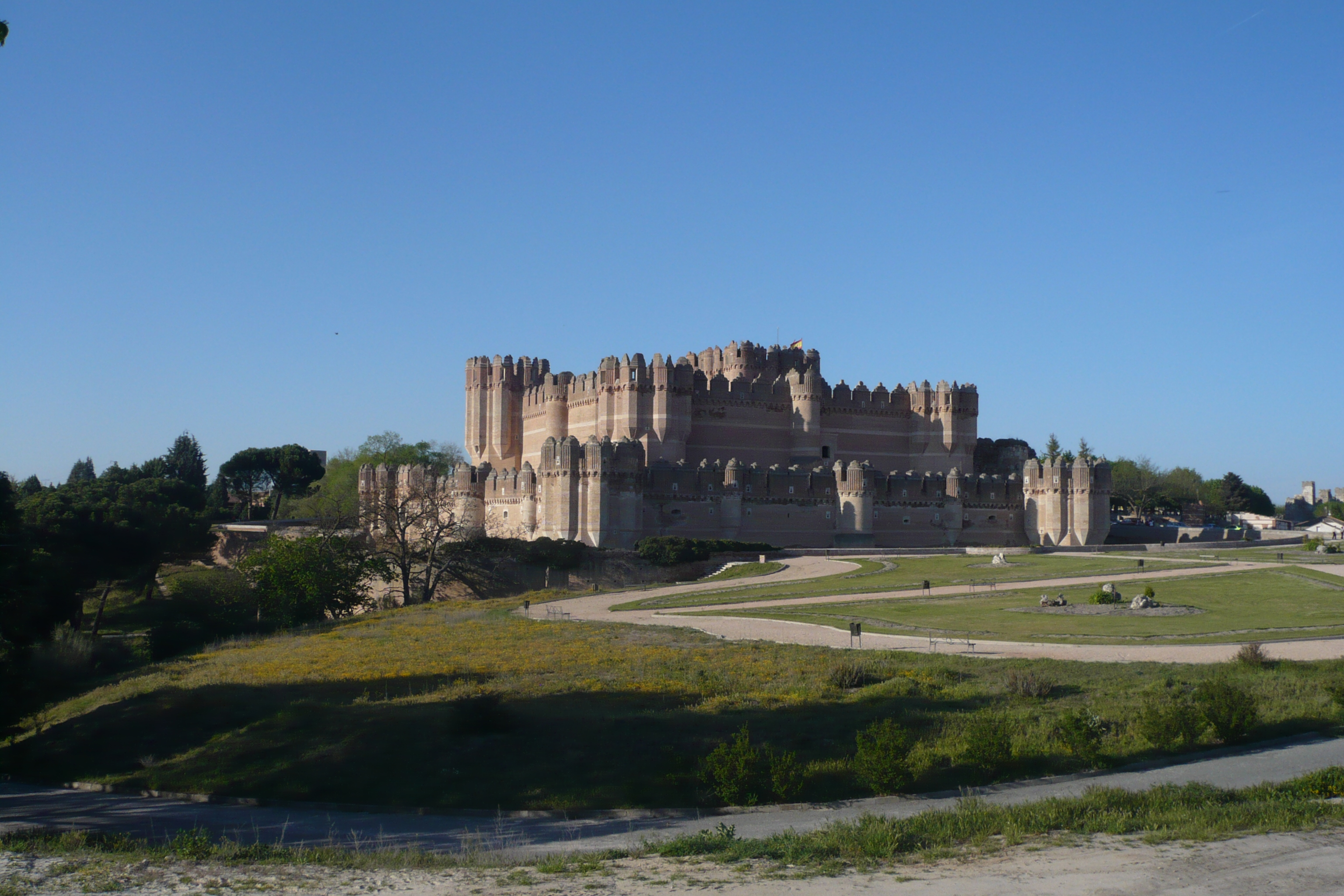
The castle

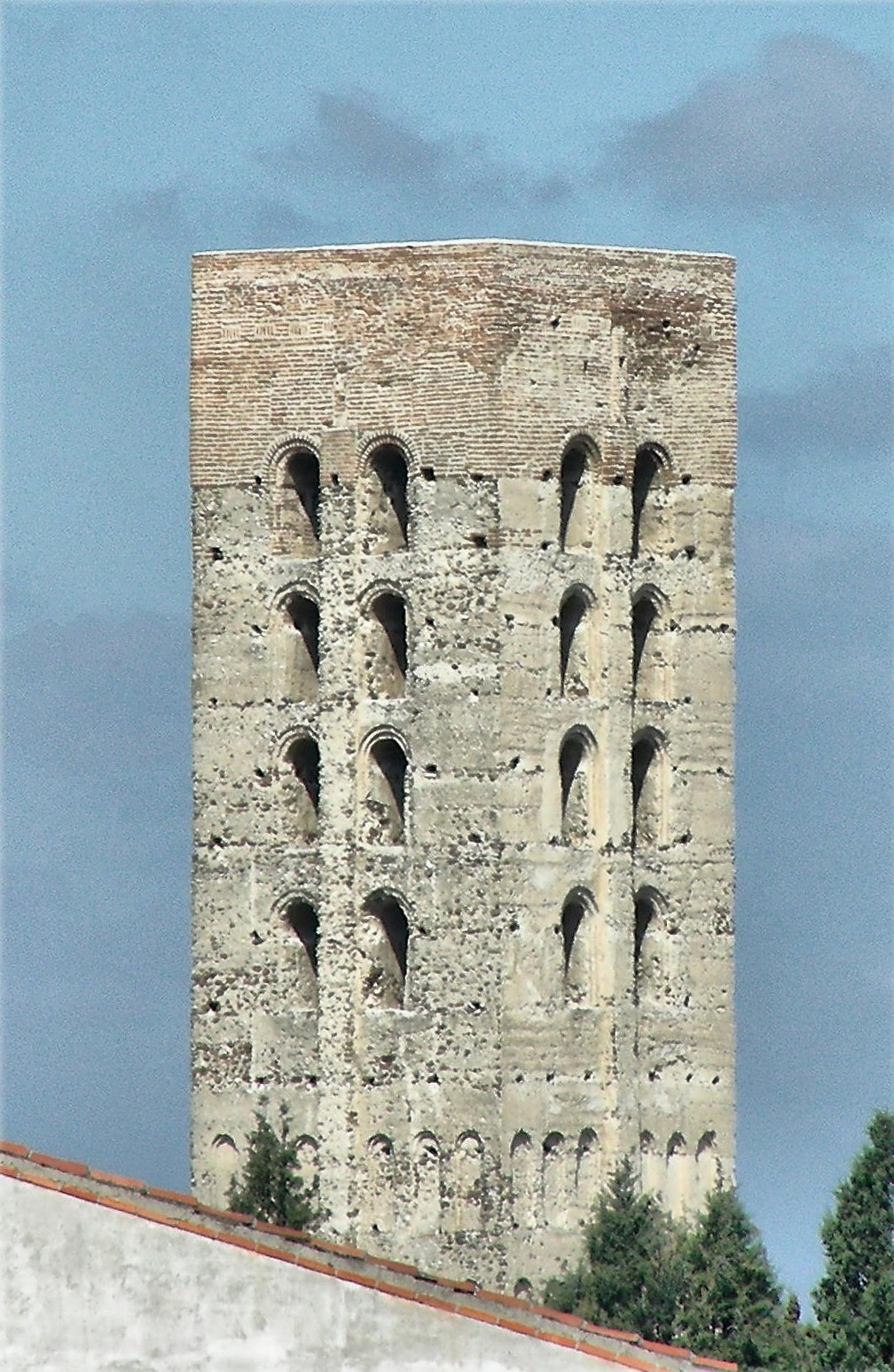
San Nicolás tower

Historically, Coca was home to a Jewish community until the expulsion of the Jews in 1492.

== Economy ==
The town is surrounded by pine forests which contribute to the economy of the town and the region. Tourism is important too, with historic sites as major attractions.

== Art and historical landmarks ==
- Castle of Coca.
- Tower of San Nicolás, the only part left of the ancient Church of San Nicolás from the 12th century.
- Coca Walls and La Villa main door.
- Vaccaei walls.
- Santa María la Mayor church, a Romanic-style church holding the Fonseca family tomb.
- The City Hall, built in 1930.
- Nuestra Señora de La Merced hospital.
- Verracos vettones of Coca.
- Roman domus.
- Roman cloaca.
- Puente Grande bridge.
- Puente Chico bridge.
