= Mudéjar theme park =

Park in Valladolid, Spain

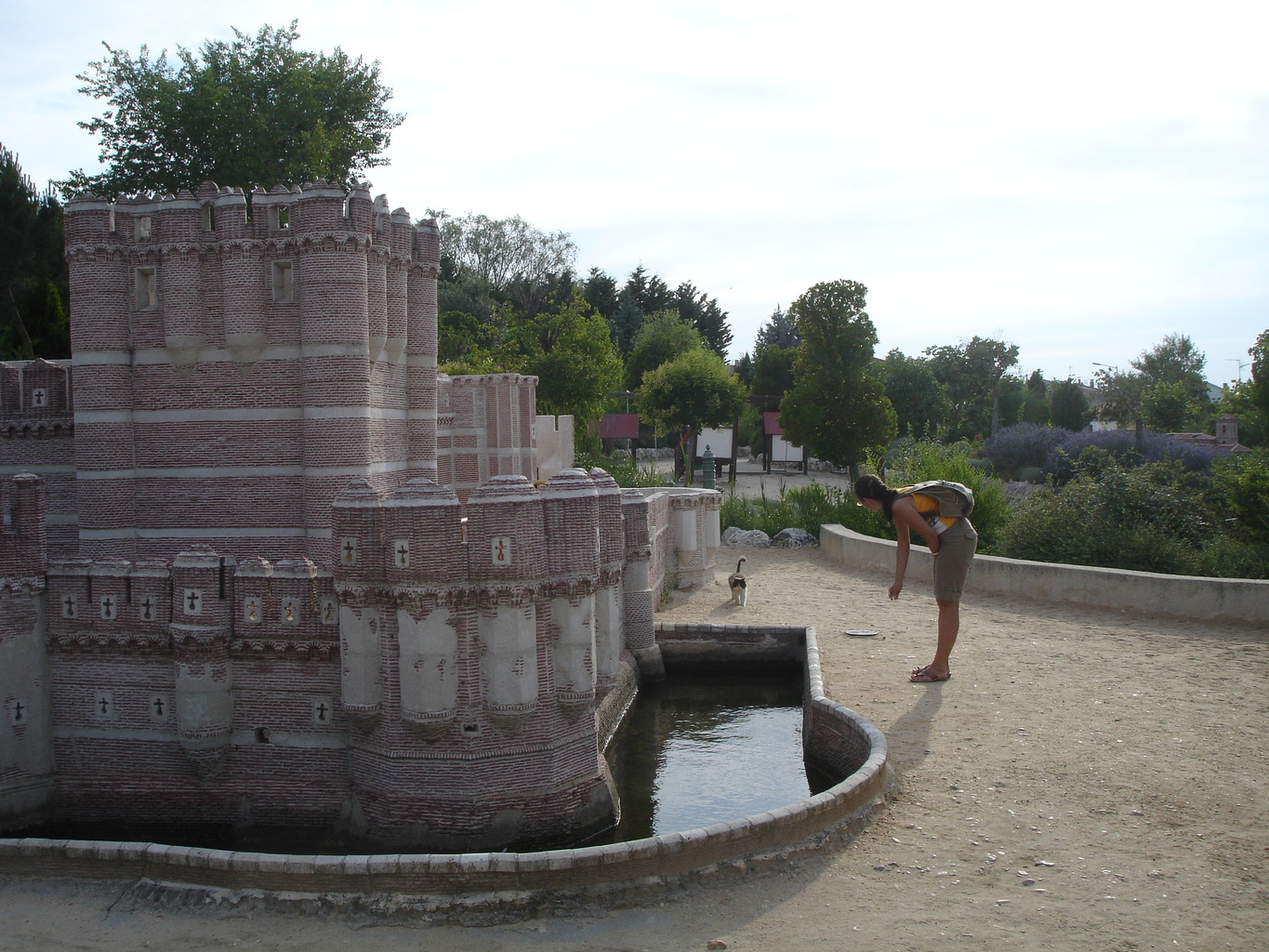
- Scale model of Coca Castle in the park
- Interactive map of Mudéjar theme park
- Location: Olmedo, Valladolid, Spain
- Coordinates: 41°17′24″N 04°40′56″W
- Opened: 1999
- Theme: Miniature park
- Area: 15,000 square metres (160,000 sq ft)
- Website: http://www.olmedo.es/pasionmudejar/

Mudéjar Theme Park is a miniature park located in Olmedo, Valladolid, in the Castilla y León autonomus community of Spain. It contains 21 scale models of buildings of Castile and Leon, including castles and churches that were constructed in the Mudéjar style. The models are generally built to a scale of either 1:6 or 1:8. Mudéjar is an architectural style unique to Spain in which the basic attributes of both Muslim Moorish and Christian Gothic architecture are combined to form a hybrid style. It was popular in medieval Spain after the Reconquista.

== History ==
The park was inaugurated in 1999.

== Description ==
The park has a total area of almost 15,000 square metres (160,000 sq ft). The largest attraction is the scale-model castle of La Mota, on display since April 2003, which is estimated to contain the same number of bricks as the original castle, a total of 2,500,000. The park model covers 140 square metres (1,500 sq ft) and rises to a height of 6.16 metres (20.2 ft). Other important buildings featured as models are the Castle of Coca in Segovia and the Valladolid churches of Pozáldez and San Andrés de Olmedo, as well as Fresno el Viejo and San Pedro de Alcázarén.

Apart from the miniature models of buildings, miniature trains run through the park; these are constructed to the scale of 1:22.5. There are also two lakes, a pond with fountains, and a playground for children. The park contains models of the rivers Adaja and the Eresma. The artificial rivers run through the park just as the real ones run through the Spanish countryside. The park also contains more than 300 species of plants.

Mudéjar Theme Park is one of the most visited sites in Olmedo.
