= Bernardos =

- Municipality
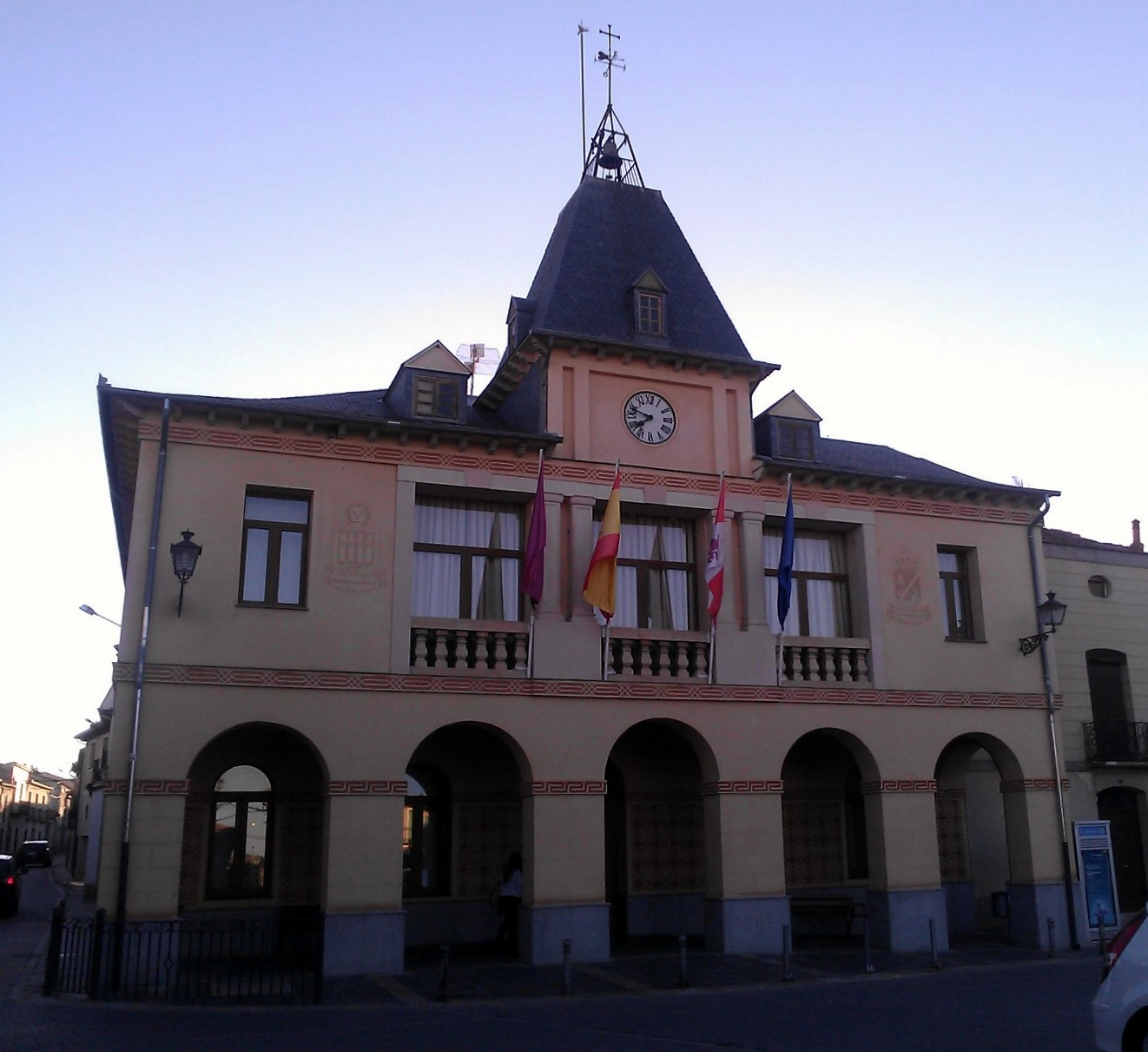
- Town hall of Bernardos

- Location in Spain. Bernardos (Spain)
- Coordinates: 41°07′40″N 4°21′04″W
- Country: Spain
- Autonomous community: Castile and León
- Province: Segovia
- Municipality: Bernardos

Area
  - Total: 29.13 km^{2} (11.25 sq mi)
- Elevation: 905 m (2,969 ft)

Population (2025-01-01)
  - Total: 462
  - Density: 15.9/km^{2} (41.1/sq mi)
- Time zone: UTC+1 (CET)
  - Summer (DST): UTC+2 (CEST)
- Website: Official website

Bernardos is a municipality located in the province of Segovia, Castile and León, Spain. According to the 2015 census (INE), the municipality has a population of 547 inhabitants. The nearest town (1 km away) is Migueláñez.

== Locations ==
Bernardos has a plaza with many bars and a swimming pool at the edge of town that is also used by the people living near Bernardos.
