= Migueláñez =

- Municipality
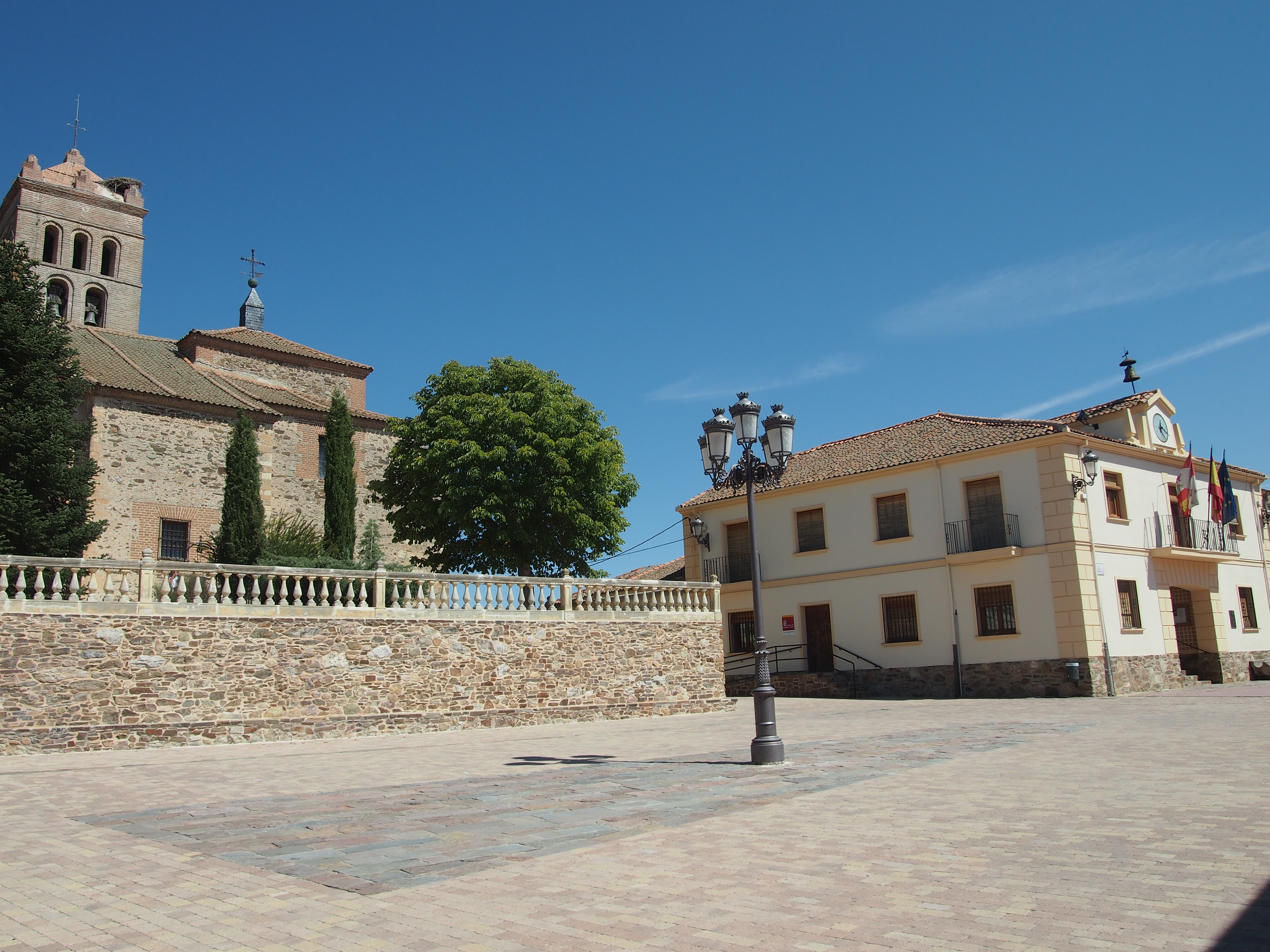
- The main square of Migueláñez with the Town Hall and the Nuestra Señora de la Asunción Church

- Flag Coat of arms

- Location within Castile and León Location within Spain
- Coordinates: 41°07′18″N 4°21′51″W
- Country: Spain
- Autonomous community: Castile and León
- Province: Segovia
- Municipality: Migueláñez

Area
  - Total: 19.22 km^{2} (7.42 sq mi)
- Elevation: 883 m (2,897 ft)

Population (2025-01-01)
  - Total: 136
  - Density: 7.08/km^{2} (18.3/sq mi)
- Time zone: UTC+1 (CET)
  - Summer (DST): UTC+2 (CEST)
- Website: Official website

Migueláñez is a municipality located in the province of Segovia, Castile and León, Spain. According to the 2004 census (INE), the municipality had a population of around 167 inhabitants, most of which are elder people who live there year-round. During the summer time and other holidays, the population increases to nearly 200 inhabitants.

== Locations ==
There's a large church at the center of town located in front of the plaza (which has been recently renovated). There's a single bar located along the road leading to Bernardos. There's also a large room within the bar used for miscellaneous purposes such as parties, games, etc. If you go up road beside's the bar you can find a small bullring and a playground for children. The town hall, or ayuntamiento in Spanish, is located next to the plaza in front of the fronton court.
