= Alhóndiga (disambiguation) =

Alhóndiga is a municipality of Guadalajara, Spain.

Alhóndiga may also refer to:

- Alhóndiga (building), in Spain, a type of historic establishment where grain was traded and stored
- Alhóndiga (Toledo), a building in Toledo, Spain
- Alhóndiga Bilbao, a culture and leisure center in Bilbao, Spain
- Alhóndiga de Granaditas, an old granary, now a museum, in Guanajuato, Mexico
