= Madrasa of Granada =

Former madrasa in Granada, Spain

Coordinates: 37°10′34″N 3°35′54″W

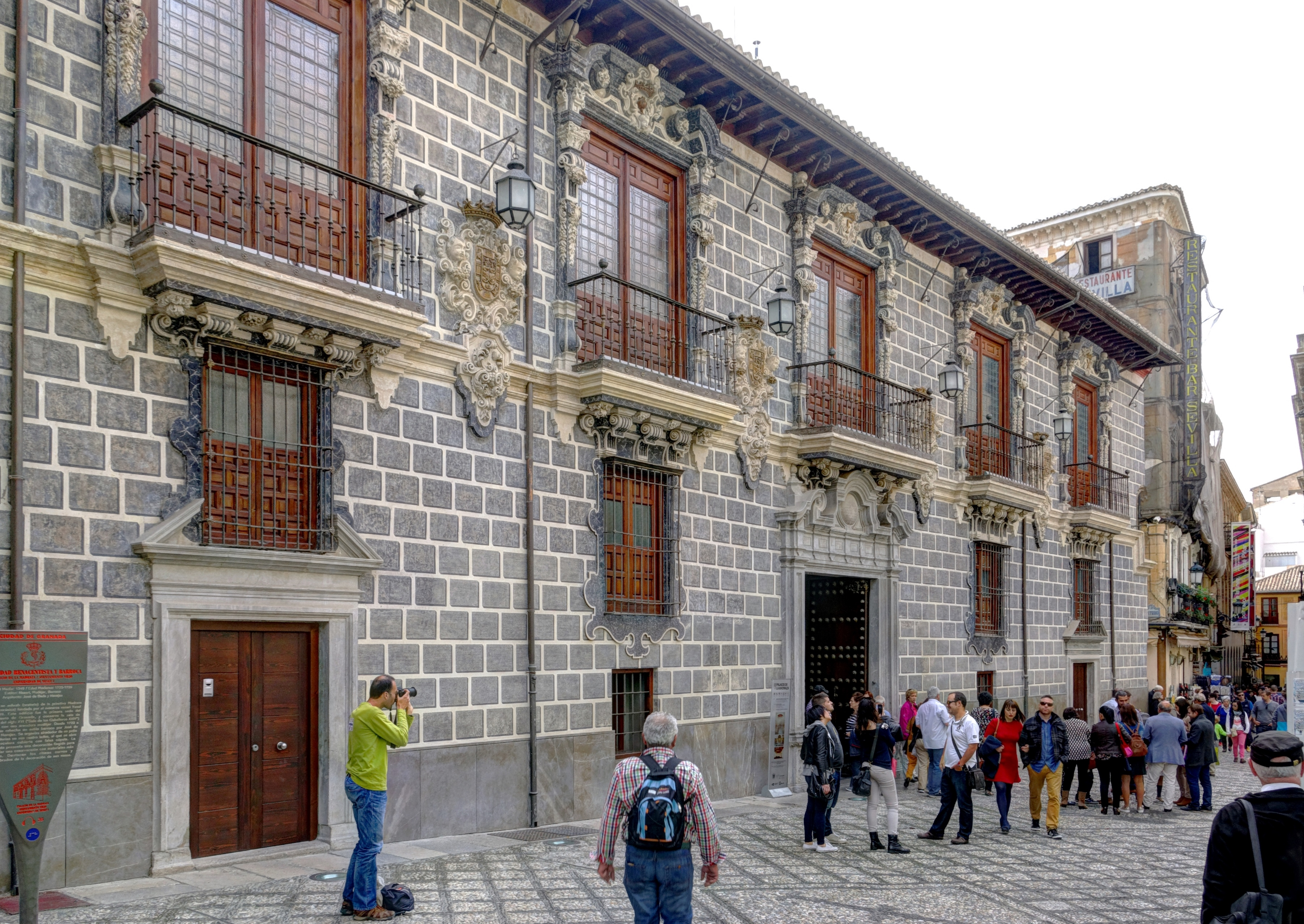
Exterior of the Palacio de la Madraza today

The Madrasa of Granada (Spanish: Madraza de Granada) also known as the Palacio de la Madraza or the Madrasa Yusufiyya (Arabic: المدرسة اليوسفية), is a historic building and former madrasa in Granada, Spain. It was founded in 1349 by the Nasrid monarch Yusuf I, Sultan of Granada. The building is currently part of the University of Granada and is the seat of the Real Academia de Bellas Artes de Nuestra Señora de las Angustias ("Royal Academy of Fine Arts of Our Lady of Sorrows").

It is located on the street now known as Calle Oficios. The madrasa was built at the heart of the city, near the main mosque (now the site of the Granada Cathedral) and the Alcaicería, then the elite bazaar where silk, gold, linen and other cloth were traded.

== History ==
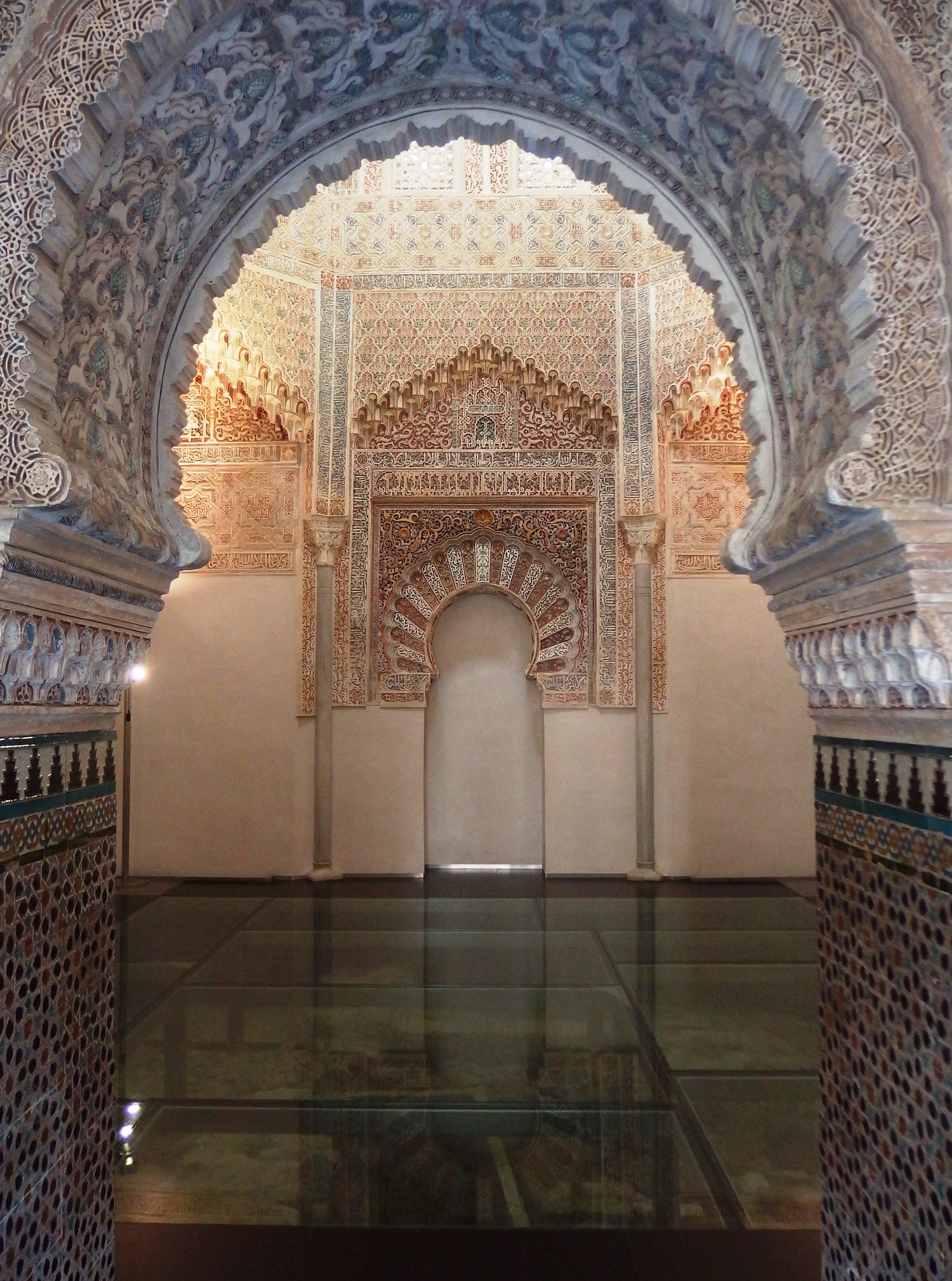
The Nasrid-era prayer room with mihrab

=== Nasrid period ===
The madrasa was founded in 1349 CE by Yusuf I, the Nasrid emir of Granada at the time. Madrasas were a type of Islamic institution newly introduced to the region at that time, having originated in Seljuk Iran in the 11th century and then spread progressively west. Madrasas then appeared first in the late 13th century in Marinid-ruled Morocco, where many were built around this period (e.g. the Madrasa as-Saffarin and the Madrasa al-Attarin in Fes), possibly influencing the design of the Nasrid madrasa in turn. The Madrasa of Yusuf I is the only major one known to have been built in al-Andalus. (The only other known madrasa in the country was a smaller, private madrasa built earlier in Malaga.) As with most madrasas in other cities, the Nasrid Madrasa was built next to the city's main mosque.

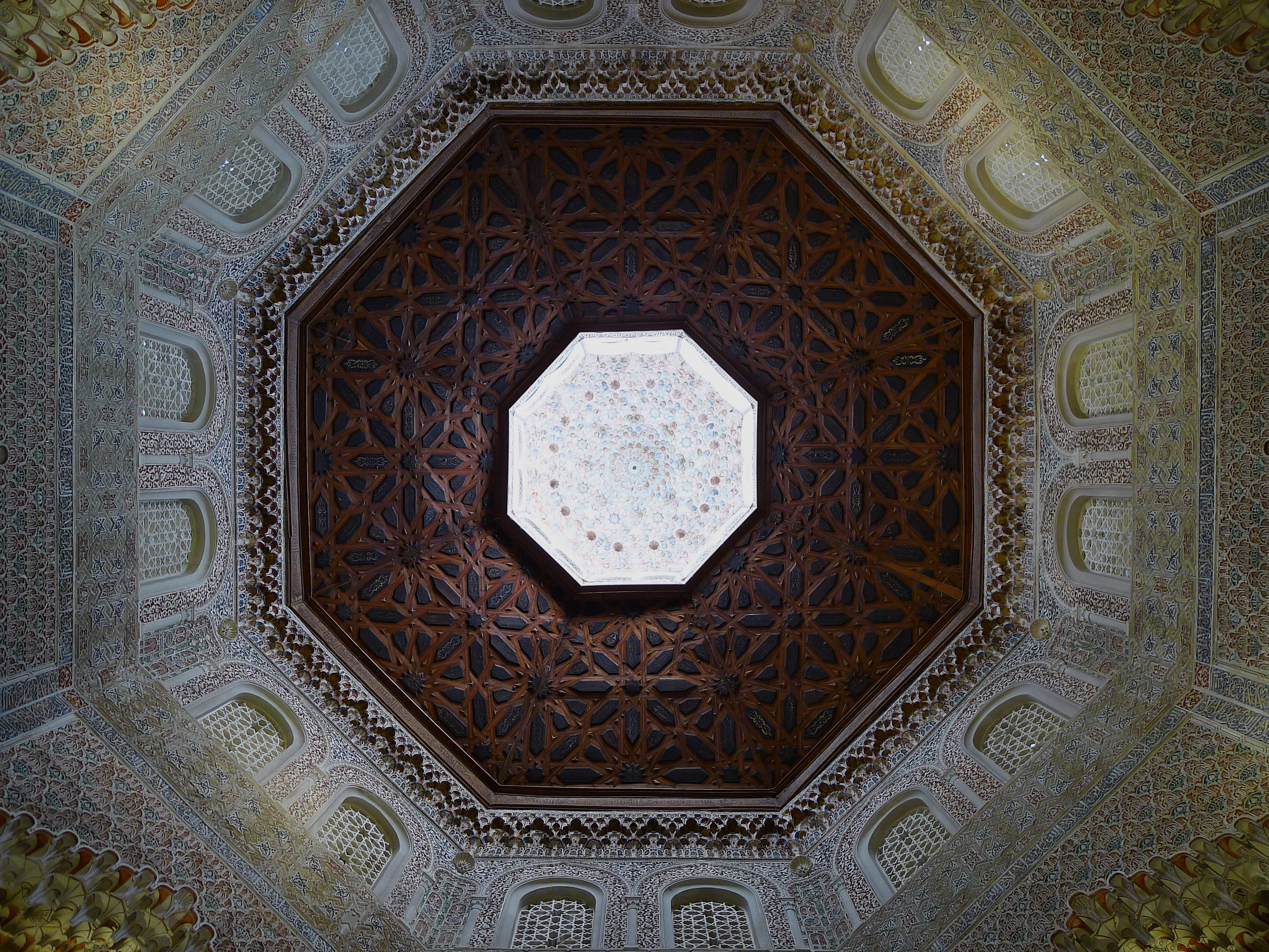
Ceiling of the prayer room

The motivation to build such an institution was to train and educate new scholars (who could then also serve as state bureaucrats), attract important existing scholars, and to enhance the Nasrid rulers' own prestige and reputation as pious Muslims. The main focus of education was normally Islamic law, Arabic grammar, and related subjects. Ibn Marzuq notably taught here in 1354. Ibn al-Khatib was also an early student here; among his teachers were Ibn al-Fajjar, Ibn Marzuq, and Ibn al-Hajj (language and law), Ibn al-Hakam, the poet Ibn al-Jayyab (rhetoric), and Sheikh Yahya ibn Hudayl (medicine and philosophy).

=== Christian Spanish period ===
After the Spanish conquest of Granada (1492), the Madrasa continued to operate until late 1499 or early 1500, as per the terms of the Treaty of Granada (1491) in which the sultan Boabdil of the Emirate of Granada surrendered to the Catholic Monarchs Ferdinand and Isabella. However, subsequent events in Granada drastically changed archbishop Hernando de Talavera's benign proselytizing methods. In 1499, an uprising by Muslims in the region of Alpujarras paved the way for Gonzalo Jimenez de Cisneros, as inquisitor-general, to intervene in Talavera's diocese. Following this, the 1491 Treaty of Granada was unilaterally declared null and void by Isabella and Ferdinand's government.

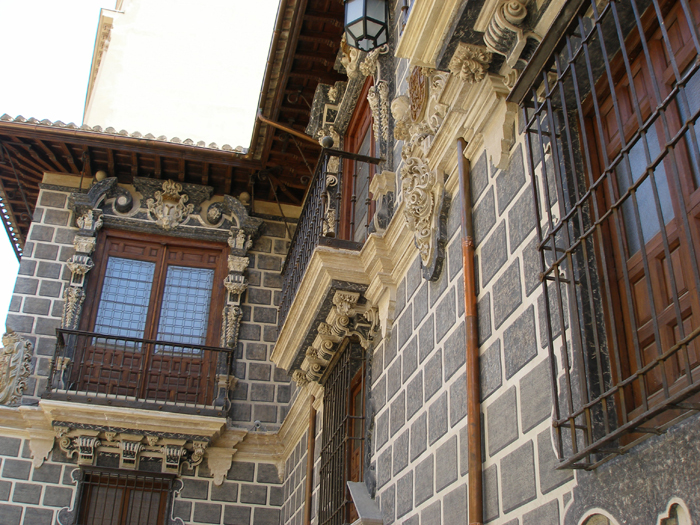
Baroque façade of the Palacio de la Madraza

Cisneros took advantage of the situation to assault the Madrasa, the contents of whose library was brought to the plaza of Bib-Rambla and burned in a public bonfire. Once pillaged and closed, the building was designated in 1500 by Ferdinand II to be the new Casa del Cabildo (city hall). Most of the original madrasa structure was demolished between 1722 and 1729 and replaced with a new baroque building, designed by José de Bada, to house the city hall.

In 1858, the town hall moved to the Plaza del Carmen, and the building was sold to be used as a textile warehouse. Two years later, the principal inscription of the Mihrab was discovered. There was also some fire damage in this era; the Echeverría family, owners of the building, hired Rafael Contreras, the same architect who restored the Alhambra, to undertake repairs and restorations.

The city bought back the building in the early 20th century, leading to further restoration work in 1939. There was an unsuccessful attempt in 1942 to turn the building into the seat of a new Instituto de los Reyes Católicos del Consejo Superior de Investigaciones Cientificas ("Catholic Monarchs Institute of the Superior Council of Scientific Investigations"). In 1976, the building became part of the University of Granada.

== Curriculum of the Madrasa ==
Among the subjects taught were theology, law, medicine, astronomy, logic, mathematics including geometry, and mechanics.

== Architecture ==
=== The original madrasa building ===
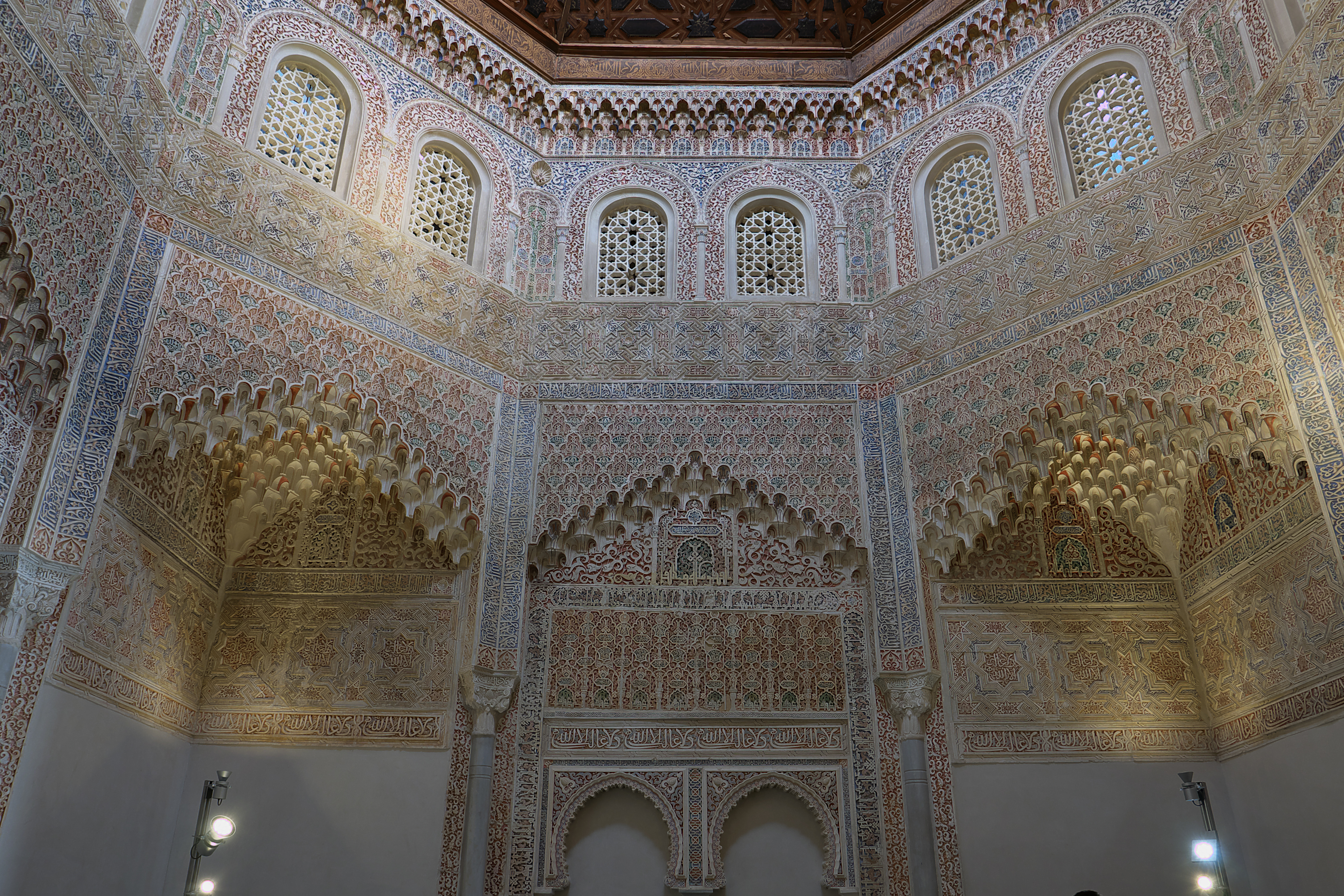
Decoration along the walls of the prayer room, including the muqarnas squinches (left and right)

As was typical of the works of Yusuf I, the building was splendid. Its exterior façade was covered in white marble, parts of which survived and were reused as flagstones before being moved to the Archaeological Museum of Granada, where they remain today. The entrance was likely a horseshoe-arch doorway framed by an alfiz. The façade was decorated with inscriptions of poetry and philosophy, carved within the alfiz above the entrance. Among these were the words "If in your spirit you provide a place for the desire to study and to flee from the shadows of ignorance, you will find in it the beautiful tree of honor. Make study shine like stars to the great, and to those who are not, bring to them the same brilliance."

The layout of the building was originally organized around a pool in the center. Most madrasas shared this layout and typically had rooms for students arranged around the courtyard. On the southeast side of the Nasrid madrasa's courtyard was a prayer room, which today is the only part of the original building that has been preserved and restored. The room, accessed via a decorated horseshoe arch doorway, is square and measures 6.84 metres per side. It has a high ceiling and roughly half-way up the walls the room transitions from a square to an octagonal shape. The transition from square to octagon is achieved at the corners of the room via four muqarnas-sculpted squinches. The rest of the walls, especially the upper walls, are covered in intricate stucco decoration with arabesque and calligraphic motifs. The upper walls are also pierced with 16 windows. At the top of the walls is a muqarnas cornice which precedes the wooden cupola ceiling.

=== The Post-Reconquista modifications ===
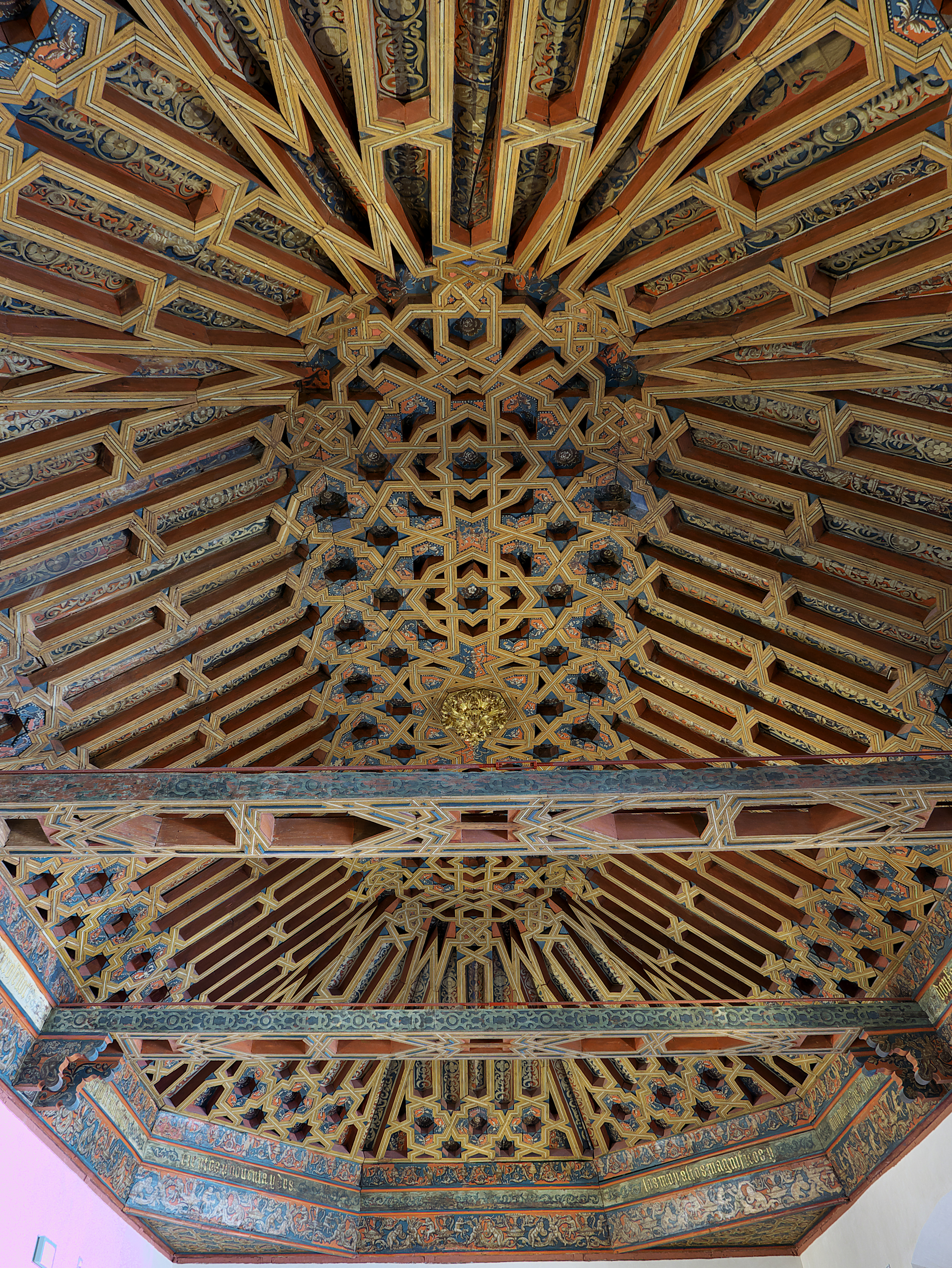
Artesonado ceiling in the Sala de los Caballeros XXIV, part of the later Spanish palace

After the completion of the Reconquista and the conversion to the Cabildo an adjacent house was annexed to enlarge the building. The octagonal Mudéjar Sala de Cabildos was constructed in this era; its 1513 decoration included an inscription alluding to the Christian conquest of the city. Eventually the pool was filled in and converted to other uses, although even after the modifications of 1554–1556, Francisco Henríquez de Jorquera describes a patio with a pool and a garden. The building was subject to major modifications, especially in the 1722–1729 at the height of the Baroque, so that what we have today is essentially an 18th-century building with elements of older buildings. The oratory or mihrab is original from the 14th century; the Sala de los Caballeros XXIV, a council room, is in Mudéjar style and features a magnificent artesonado ceiling. The external façade of the building, with rich carved decoration around its windows and entrance, is in the Churrigueresque style.

== Archeology ==
The archeological excavations in 2006–2007 turned up various remains, including traces of older buildings on the site dating back as far as the 11th century. Two human burials were identified beneath what is now the oratory. They certainly date back at least to the 11th century, and possibly as far back as Roman times, though most likely they date from after the Umayyad conquest of Hispania.

== Conservation and access ==
The building underwent a series of restorations starting at the end of the 20th century. Extensive archaeological excavations were carried out in 2006–2007. Now part of the University of Granada, the building was opened to the public in 2011.

== Bibliography ==
- Rafael López Guzmán; María Elena Díez Jorge, eds. (2007). La Madraza : pasado, presente y futuro (in Spanish). university of Granada: Editorial Universidad de Granada. ISBN 9788433845993..
- Mattei, Luca (2008), "Estudio de la Madraza de Granada a partir del registro aqueológico y de las metodologías utilizadas en la intervención del 2006" (PDF), @rqueología y Territorio (5): 181–192 Includes architectural plan, photographs of the archeological excavations, and images obtained with Ground Penetrating Radar.
- José Manuel Gómez-Moreno Calera; Antonio Malpica Cuello; Luca Mattei; José Policarpo Cruz Cabrera (2013). Guía breve del Palacio de la Madraza (in Spanish). university of Granada: Editorial Universidad de Granada. ISBN 9788433854537..
