= Corral del Carbón =

Historic monument in Granada, Spain

Coordinates: 37.1749°N 3.5980°W

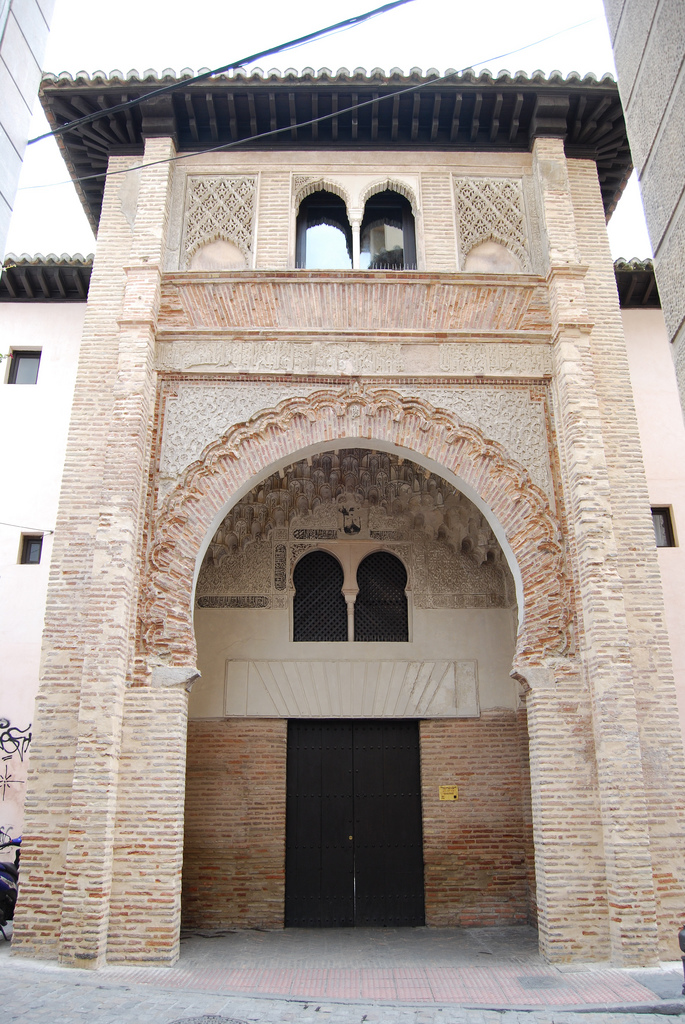
Facade and entrance of the Corral del Carbón

The Corral del Carbón, originally al-Funduq al-Jadida, is a 14th-century historic building in the Spanish city of Granada (Andalusia). It is the only funduq (commercial warehouse or inn) or alhóndiga preserved from the Nasrid period in the Iberian Peninsula. The building is located south of the Albaicin quarter, near the present-day Cathedral (formerly the city's Great Mosque).

== History ==
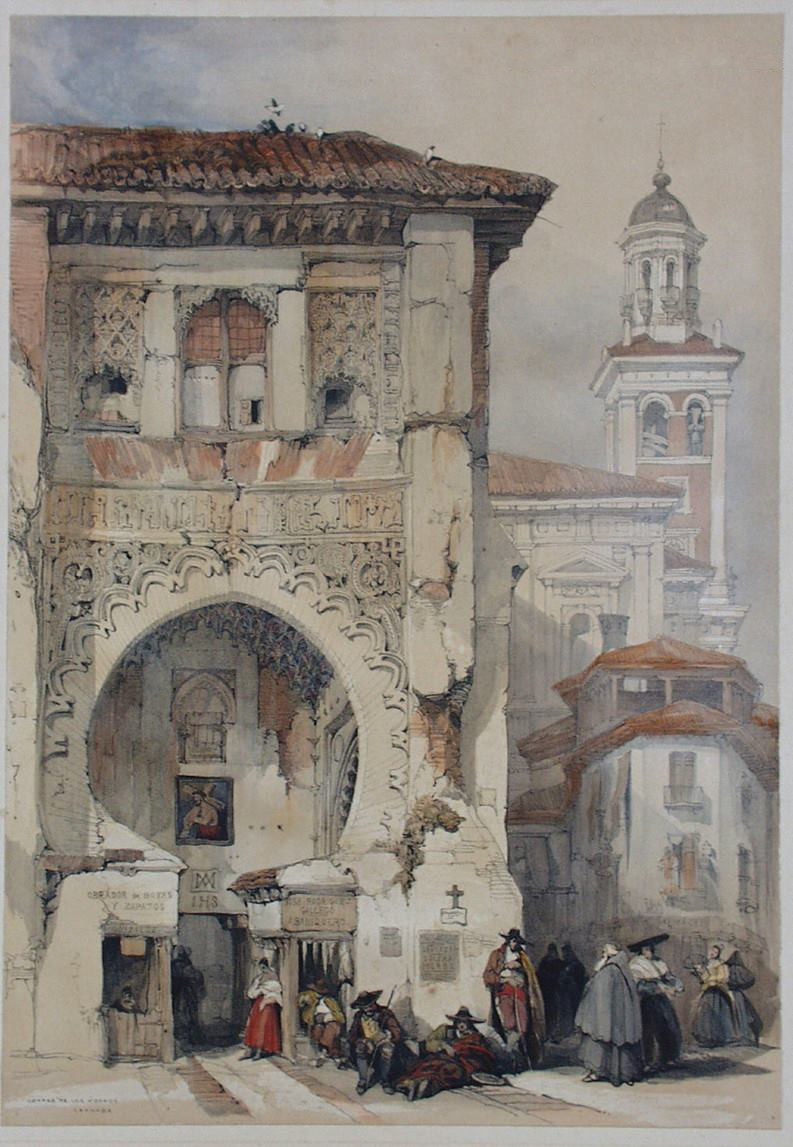
Aspect of the Corral del Carbón in the 19th century, drawing by David Roberts

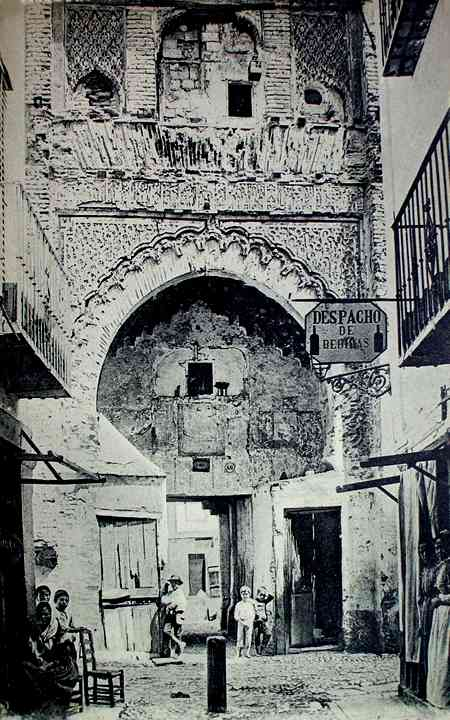
View of the building's facade circa 1900, in a state of disrepair

The building dates from the Nasrid period but the exact date of its construction is not known. It is believed to be from the early 14th century, before 1336 (when it is mentioned in some historical documents). Its original name was al-Funduq al-Jadida or "the New Inn/Warehouse". Like other urban caravanserais (known as funduqs in al-Andalus and Maghreb) at that time, it was a commercial and trading center serving as a warehouse for grain and as an inn and storage facility for merchants from outside the city. The existence of caravanserais can be traced in part from the Greek pandocheion structures (from which the word funduq derives), through the later Roman horreum until Islamic times. While most funduqs in al-Andalus were modest buildings which have since disappeared, the Funduq al-Jadida reportedly belonged to the wives of the Nasrid sultans and thus had a more monumental appearance.

It was located next to the city's central bazaar, the qaysariyya (known today as the Alcaicería), which in turn was located next to the city's Great Mosque (its main Friday mosque), occupied today by the Cathedral. A small bridge, called al-qantarat al-jadida ("new bridge") until 1501 and later Puente del carbón or Puente del Álamo or Puente de los Curtidores (Qantarat al-Dabbayin), was located on the Darro River and linked the building with the bazaar.

In 1494, after the fall of Granada to Christian Spain, the Catholic Monarchs granted it to their lieutenant, Juan de Arana or Sancho Arana. Upon his death in 1531 the building was sold by public auction and became a theatrical courtyard (a corral de comedias) until at least 1593. During this period the interior of the building was modified in order to accommodate theater audiences. It was then used in the 17th century as a tenement or residential complex while the ground floor was used as a place to weigh and store coal, which gave the building its present name Corral del Carbón ("Courtyard of Coal").

In 1887, the Commission of Historical and Artistic Monuments of the province of Granada requested to purchase the building from its private owners. In 1918, it was declared a National Monument but was threatened by a state of disrepair. Finally, in 1928, Leopoldo Torres Balbás, the curator and chief architect of the Alhambra, arranged for the property to be purchased by the government with the help of revenues from ticket sales to the Alhambra. The deed of purchase was signed on October 24 of that year, and the many families residing in the building were subsequently evicted. Torres Balbas was charged with restoring and repairing the building, a process which took place in two phases from 1929 to 1931. This restoration also removed many modern or more recent additions to the building, as well as replacing the roofs and floors.

In 1992 the building was again restored by the architect Rafael Soler Márquez. The facade underwent another process of cleaning and consolidation by the company Siglos Conservación y Restauración, s.l., under the direction of Lola Blanca López and Lourdes Blanca López, which was completed in 2006.

== Architecture ==
The building's original medieval interior has not been preserved intact, but its general layout has remained the same. It features a simple floor plan with a nearly square central courtyard (measuring 16.8 by 15.6 meters) surrounded by a three-story gallery, similar to funduqs in Morocco such as those of Fez. A stone basin and former fountain stands at the center of the courtyard.

Its most notable feature is the monumental projecting entrance gateway, with the doors situated within a large iwan (a vaulted space open to one side, originating in ancient Sassanian architecture). The building's architectural form can thus be traced to Middle Eastern architectural models like those of Egypt and further east, where similar monumental entrances were more common. A similar form is also found in the Gate of Justice (Puerta de la Justicia) at the Alhambra. The ornamentation of the facade, however, is more strictly Nasrid or Moorish. The alfiz (square frame) has featuring multilobed and interlacing arch motifs around the archway and carved arabesques filling the spandrels, as well as mocárabes (muqarnas) sculpting in the vault of the iwan above the doorway. Above the alfiz frame is a horizontal band with an Arabic Kufic inscription of Surah 112 of the Qur'an, and above this is a double-arched window. On either side of the window are panels of decorative plaster carved with sebka and arabesque patterns. The projecting entrance is topped by a typical wooden eaves supported by corbels, as was typical of Andalusi and Moroccan architecture.

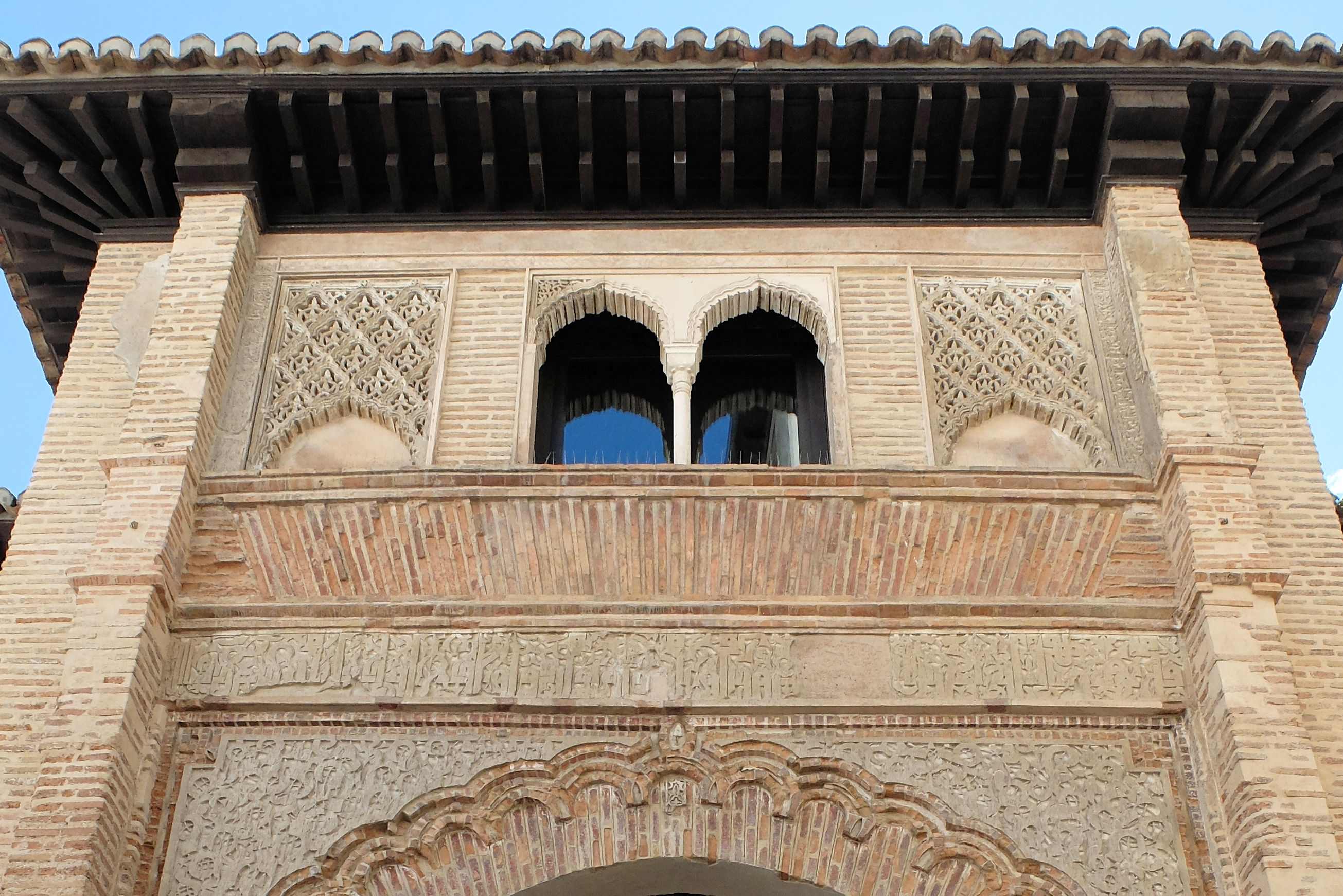
The decoration above the archway of the entrance, including the Kufic inscription

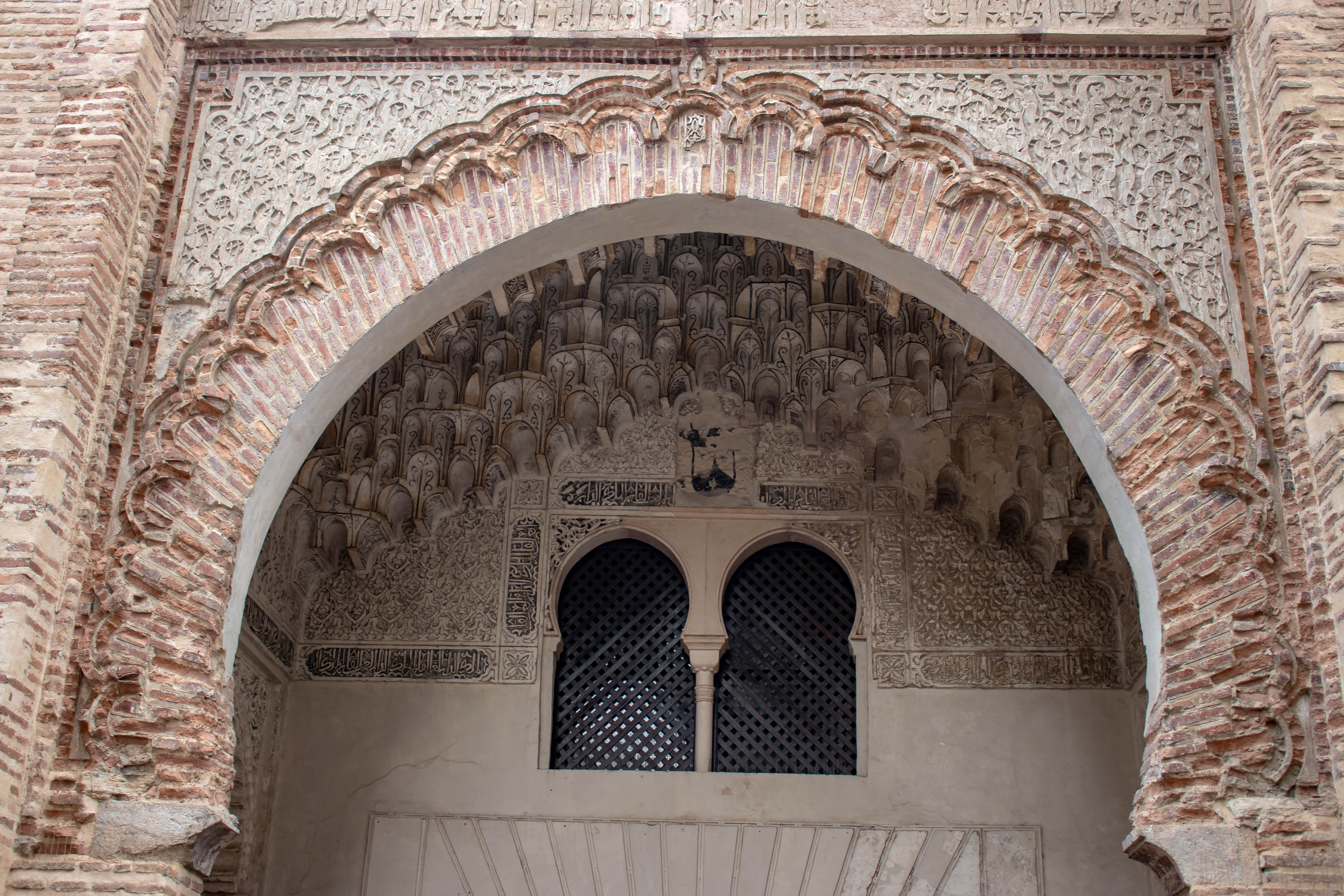
The decoration around the archway of the entrance iwan

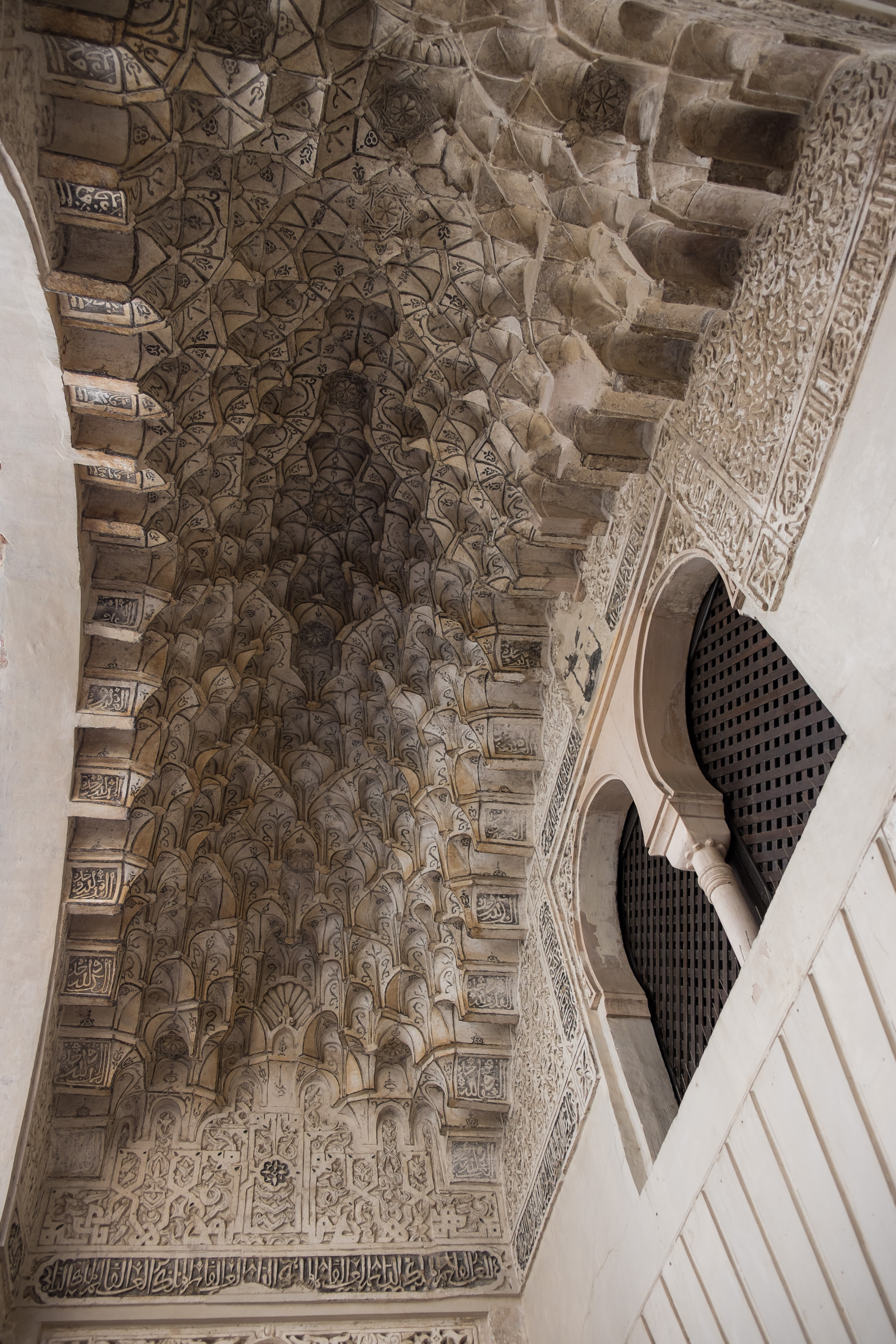
The muqarnas vaulting above the entrance

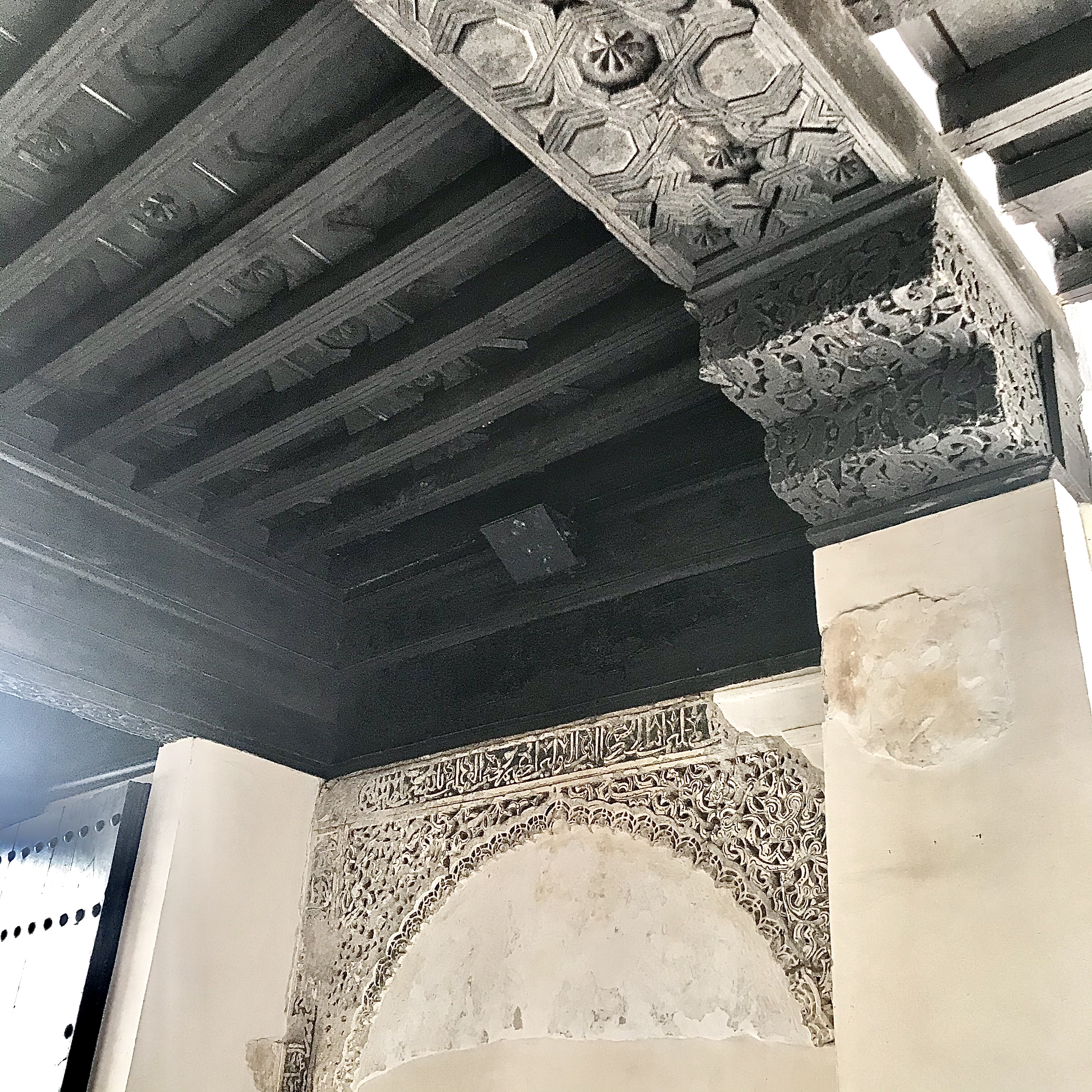
Remains of decoration in the vestibule of the building

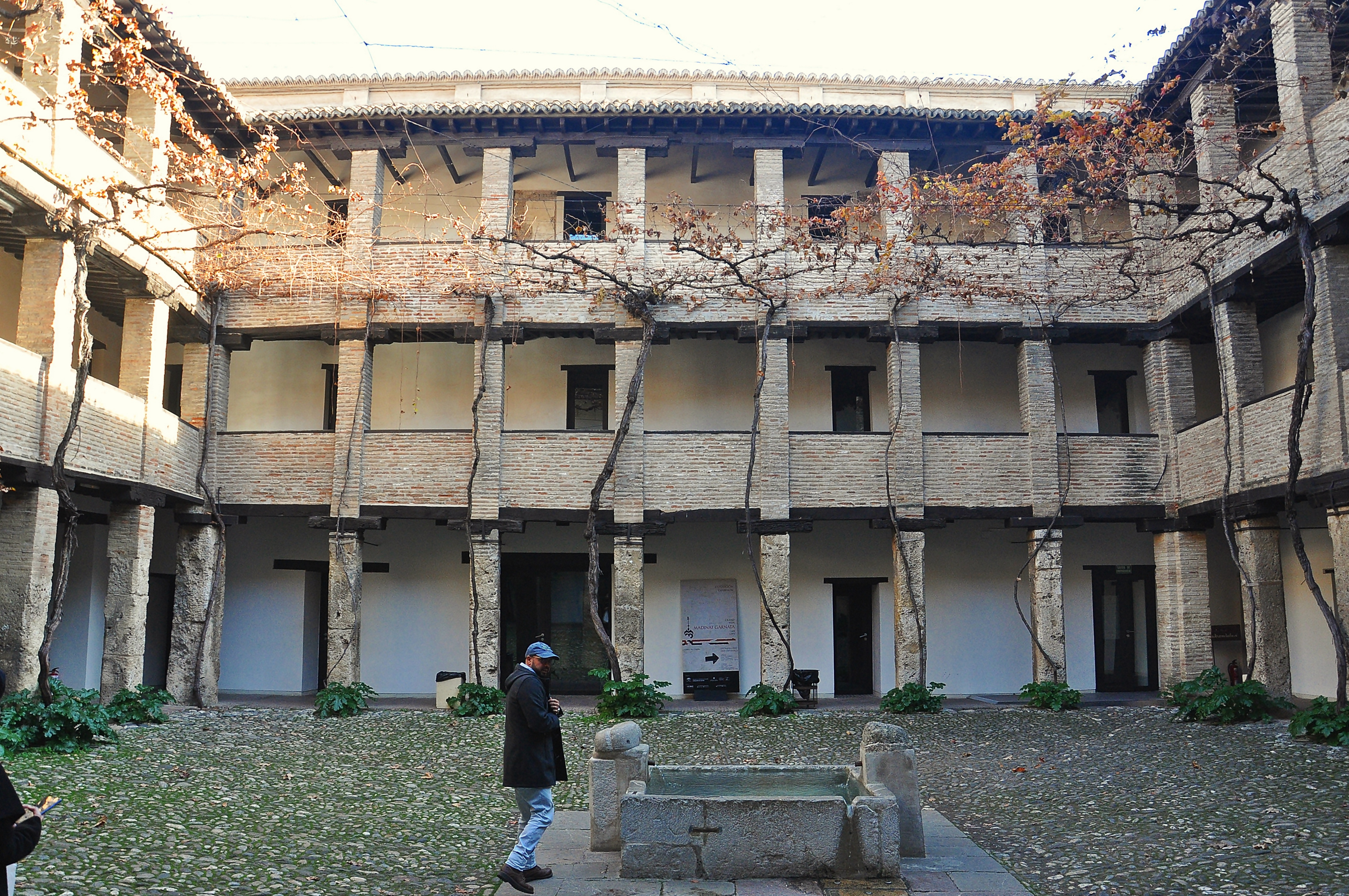
The central courtyard

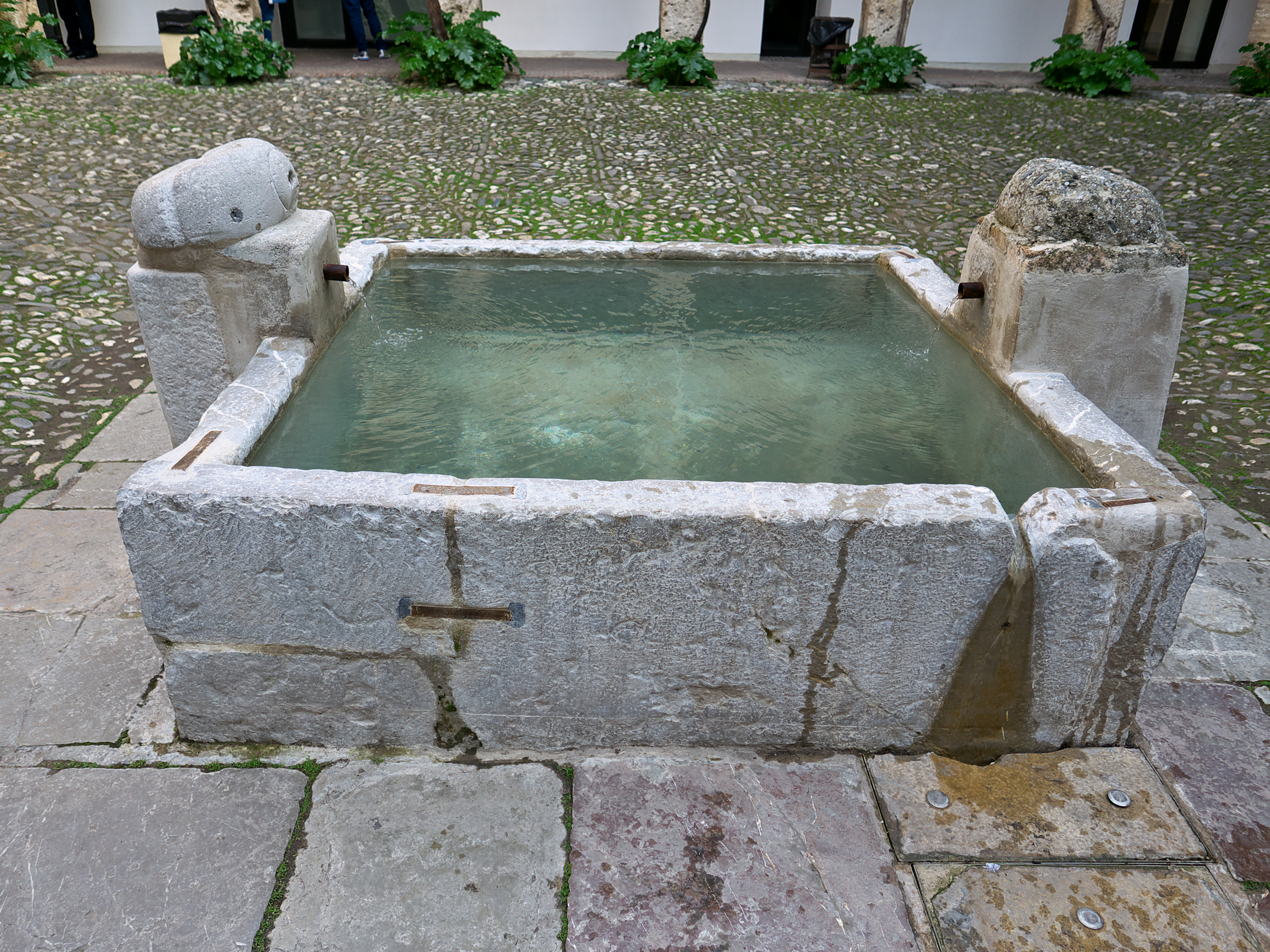
The water basin and fountain at the center of the courtyard

== Current use ==
Today the building is a tourist attraction and historic site in the city. It also houses the offices of the City of Granada Orchestra, and the International Festival of Music and Dance of Granada, and is occasionally used for various cultural performances. There is also an office in the building where visitors can purchase official tickets issued by the municipal Tourist Office to the various Alhambra locations at a reduced price.
