= Castril Palace =

Renaissance style palace in Granada

Coordinates: 37°10′43″N 3°35′30″W

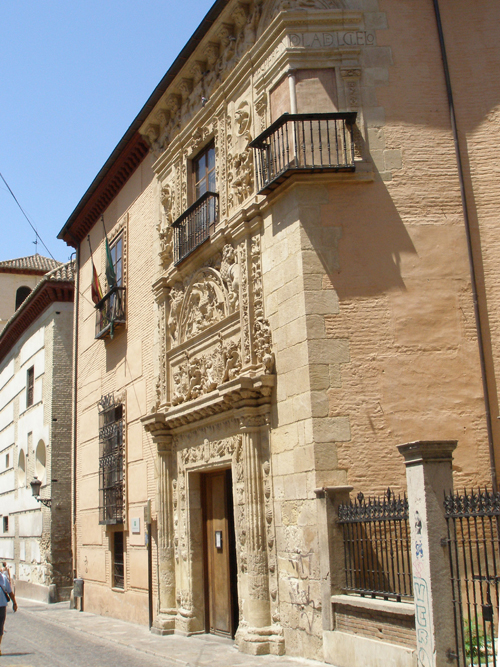
Portal of the Castril Palace

The Castril palace (also House of Castril) is a Renaissance style palace located in Sacromonte, a district of the Spanish city of Granada. It was built in 1539. Nowadays it hosts the Archaeological Museum of Granada.

The outside of the building is a mixture of unadorned stucco with a highly-decorated facade, common for Spanish architecture of the time.

The house is nailed in the Race of the Darro, in the old Arab district of Ajsaris, seat of 16th century's granadine nobility. The palace is one of the best Renaissance palaces of Granada and belonged to the family of Hernando de Zafra, secretary of Catholic monarchs who participated actively in reconquering it from the Muslim hands during the Reconquista.

At the top of the facade the date of its foundation is recorded: 1539. This work has been attributed to Sebastián de Alcántara, one of the most outstanding disciples of Diego de Siloé. In 1917, the Castril palace was acquired by arabist and orientalist Leopoldo Eguílaz y Yanguas to make it a definitive location of the Archaeological Museum of Granada.
