= Alcaicería of Granada =

Market street in Granada

Coordinates: 37°10′33.2″N 3°35′54.2″W

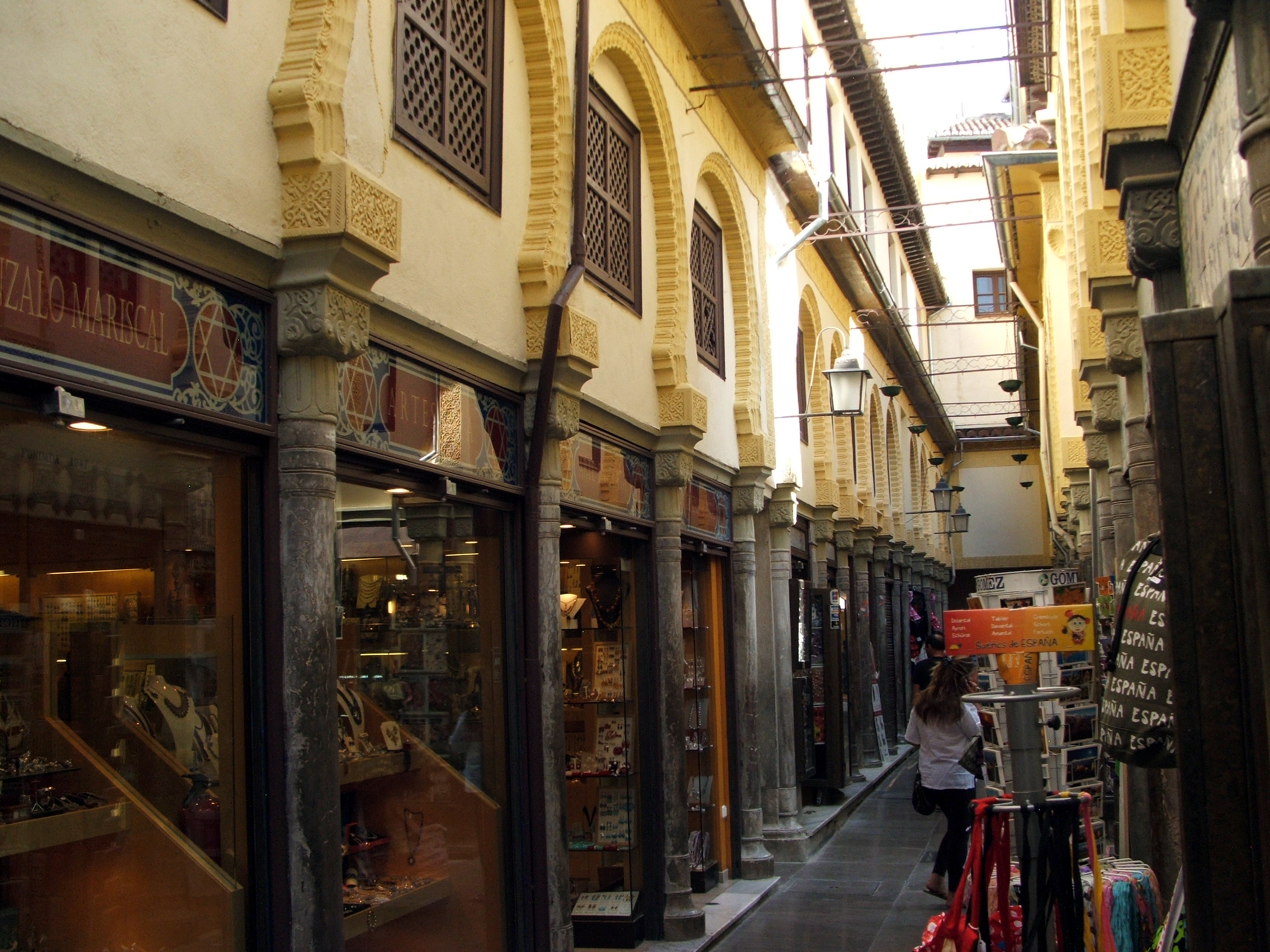
The Alcaicería today

The Alcaicería is a market street in the historic heart of the city of Granada, Spain. It is located on the site of the former main bazaar, from which it derives its name (Arabic: القيسرية, romanized: al-qaysariyya). The original bazaar dated from the city's Arab-Islamic era, during the period of Nasrid rule (13th-15th centuries), but it was destroyed by fire in 1843 and subsequently rebuilt in its current form.

== History ==
This part of the city became important in the Zirid period in the 11th century when the city's Great Mosque (replaced by the cathedral today) was built here. Initially, this area was only lightly urbanized and was occupied initially by an almunia (semi-rural estate) owned by the ruling Zirids. The construction of the Great Mosque may have been intended to promote the city's growth in this direction, and it is here that first major markets of the city developed during this period.

As the city expanded during the Nasrid period, the area became less central but the new rulers re-invested in it and it became the commercial heart of the city. It is from this time that the Alcaicería dates. The Nasrid emir Yusuf I (r. 1333–1354) raised its profile by building a madrasa (the Madrasa al-Yusufiyya) and a caravanserai (the Funduq al-Jadida) nearby, as well as remodeling the Alcaicería as a whole. A large part of the district around the Great Mosque was occupied by souqs (markets) and commercial establishments. To the northeast of the mosque was a square known as Raḥbat Masjid al-A'ẓam ("Square of the Great Mosque"), where perfumers and notaries were located. Between this square and the Darro River to the south was the most important market of the city, known as al-Saqqāṭīn, which despite its name (literally meaning "the secondhand clothes sellers") was home to many types of businesses including silversmiths, shoemakers, and haberdasheries. Closer to the river were the markets that sold food, with shops grouped together by category. Various caravanserais (funduq in Arabic or later alhóndiga in Spanish) were built in the area to store goods and to provide accommodation for foreign merchants.

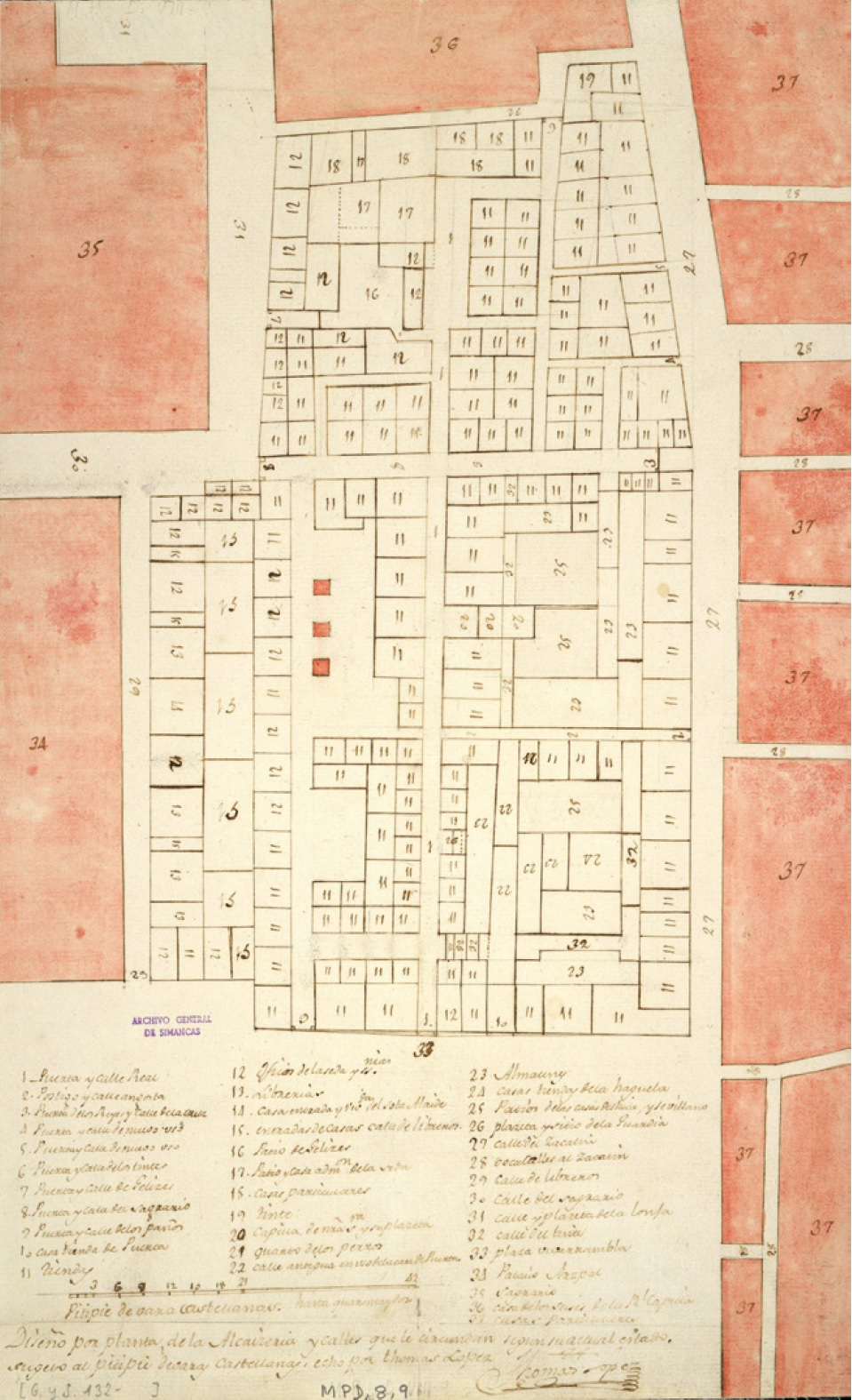
Plan of the Alcaicería in 1787, according to Tomás López Maño. The district was destroyed by fire in 1843 and subsequently rebuilt in different form.

Among these other markets, the Alcaicería (al-qaysariyya) itself was a distinct bazaar that was owned by the Nasrids directly and which was locked and watched at night. It was in this market that silk and other select valuable goods were sold, which the Nasrid authorities taxed at a higher rate. It was located to the southwest of the Great Mosque and covered an area of almost 4,600 square metres (50,000 sq ft), enclosed today by the Libreros, Oficios, Tinte, and Zacatín streets and the Bibarrambla Square. To the south of the market, one of the bridges over the Darro, al-Qanṭara al-Jadīda ("the New Bridge"), (Note: The river is now covered by the Reyes Católicos avenue.) led to the state-owned Funduq al-Jadida.

After the Christian conquest of the city by the Catholic Monarchs in 1492, ownership of the Alcaicería passed on to the Spanish crown, which continued to manage it as a guarded market. Its official name was the Real Sitio y Fuerte de la Alcaicería ("Royal Site and Stronghold of the Alcaicería"). A plan of the market drawn in 1787 by Tomás López Maño documents its layout. The plan shows that it was made up of various perpendicular streets and that it contained up to 152 shops. The market was destroyed by fire in 1843 and rebuilt on a much smaller scale, using a different Neo-Moorish style that emulated Nasrid architecture. The reconstruction reduced the Alcaicería in size and removed many of its smaller internal streets so that larger apartment blocs could be created.
