= Alhóndiga (Toledo) =

Building in Toledo

Coordinates: 39°51′41″N 4°01′16″W

The Alhóndiga is a building in the Spanish city of Toledo, Spain. Situated in the north of the historic ward, its construction dates to the beginning of the 17th century.

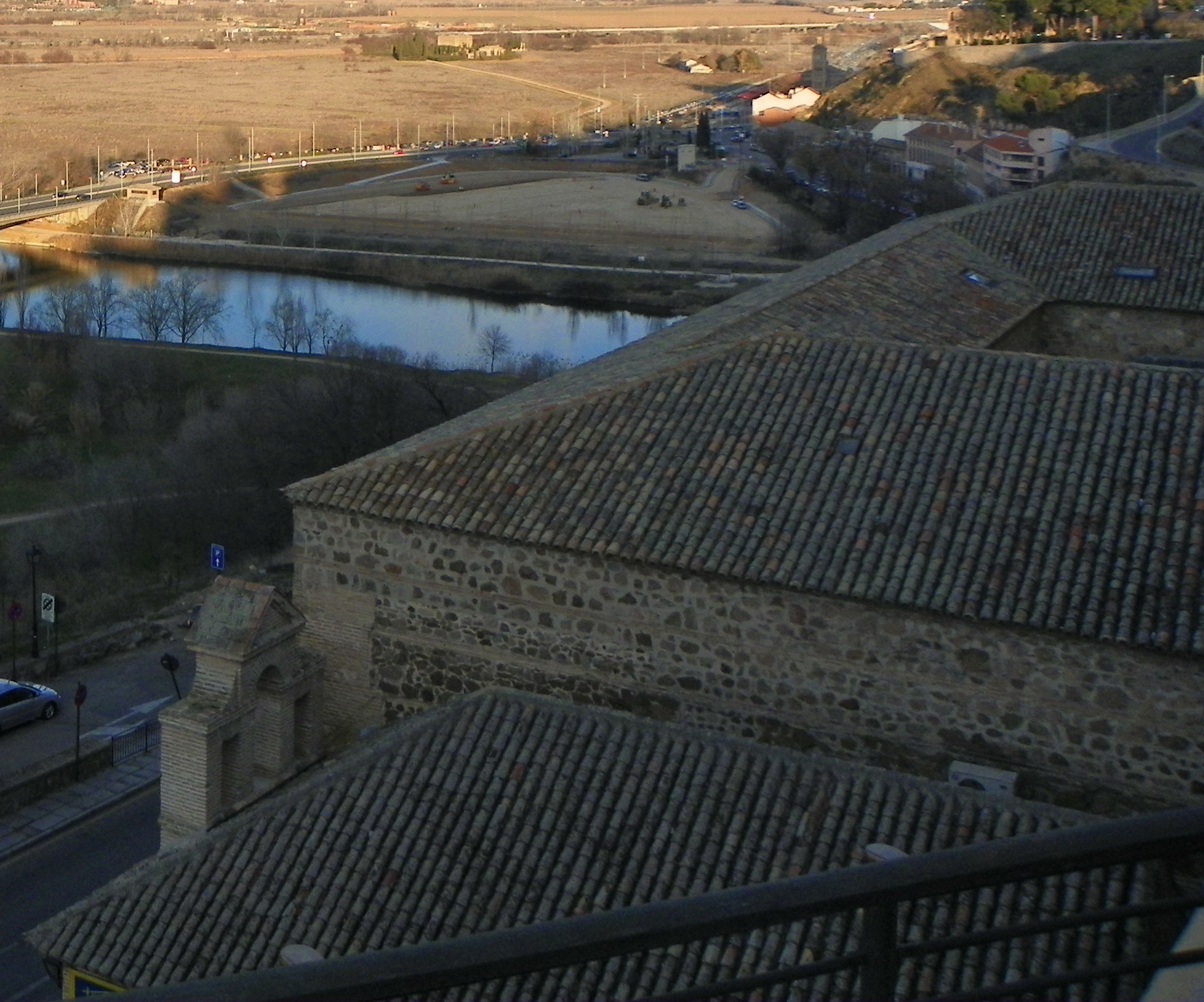
The Alhóndiga

== History ==
The alhóndigas, also called "alholíes", that in their Islamic origin were at the same time mesones and places for sale, happen to be almost all them, from the 16th century, local for exclusive storage and trade of wheat, ending up becoming official municipal centers almost always.

The original building, built between 1575 and 1582, completely collapsed in 1593.

In 1594, Nicolás de Vergara el Mozo drew a system of containment for the Miradero, afterwards proceeding to the reconstruction of the Alhóndiga, which concluded in 1536.

The Alhóndiga has had many different uses throughout history. During the Peninsular War it was used as a French military warehouse. In recent years it has been a bus station.

== Description ==
It is a rectangular floor construction, simple and eminently functional; Is rather closed to the outside, by the matter of grain storage. A series of strong pillars, cruciform in cross section, composed of pebble stones in its bases, distribute the interior space of the building in a series of naves, of enjalbegados elevations.

Outwardly, on a stony base the walls are erected, mixed brick, brick-masonry, the rafters of this latter material being true boxes, uniform distribution in the walls.

The two facades of the building were coupled to it in 1960, coming from the Toledan convent of Spanish Discalced Trinitarians; These are Plateresque portals, thinned; One with tympanum on the lintel and both with the cross of the Trinitarian Order.
