= Archaeological Museum of Granada =

Coordinates: 37°10′43″N 3°35′30″W

- Museo Arqueológico de Granada
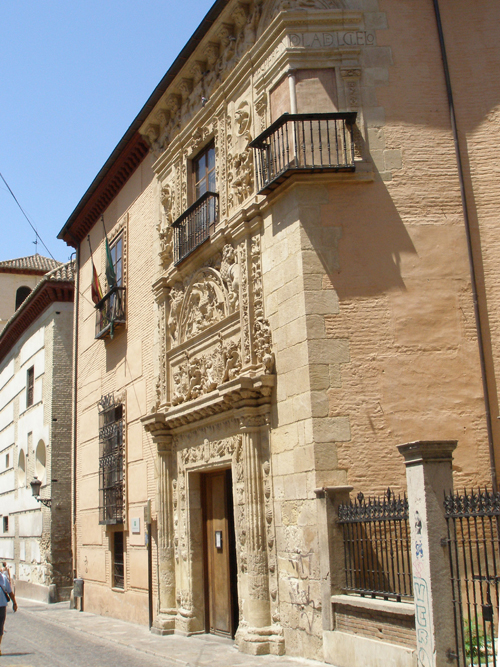
- Established: 1859
- Location: Granada, Spain
- Type: Archaeology museum
- Owner: General State Administration

The Archaeological Museum of Granada is an archaeological museum in Granada, Spain. It was established in 1879.

The museum moved to its current home in the Albayzín district in the 20th century. It is located at 41, Carrera del Darro in the Castril Palace, dating from the 16th century. It includes a Renaissance patio. The building's façade was created in 1593.

== Collections ==
It hosts many artefacts from a range of time periods, namely halls dedicated to Paleolithic and hominization process; Neolithic and Eneolithic; Bronze Age; Colonizations and Hispano-Roman peoples; Roman era, Late Roman and Paleo Christian; Hispano-Visigothic and Mozarab archeology; and Western Middle Ages and Hispano-Muslim Archeology.

== Gallery ==
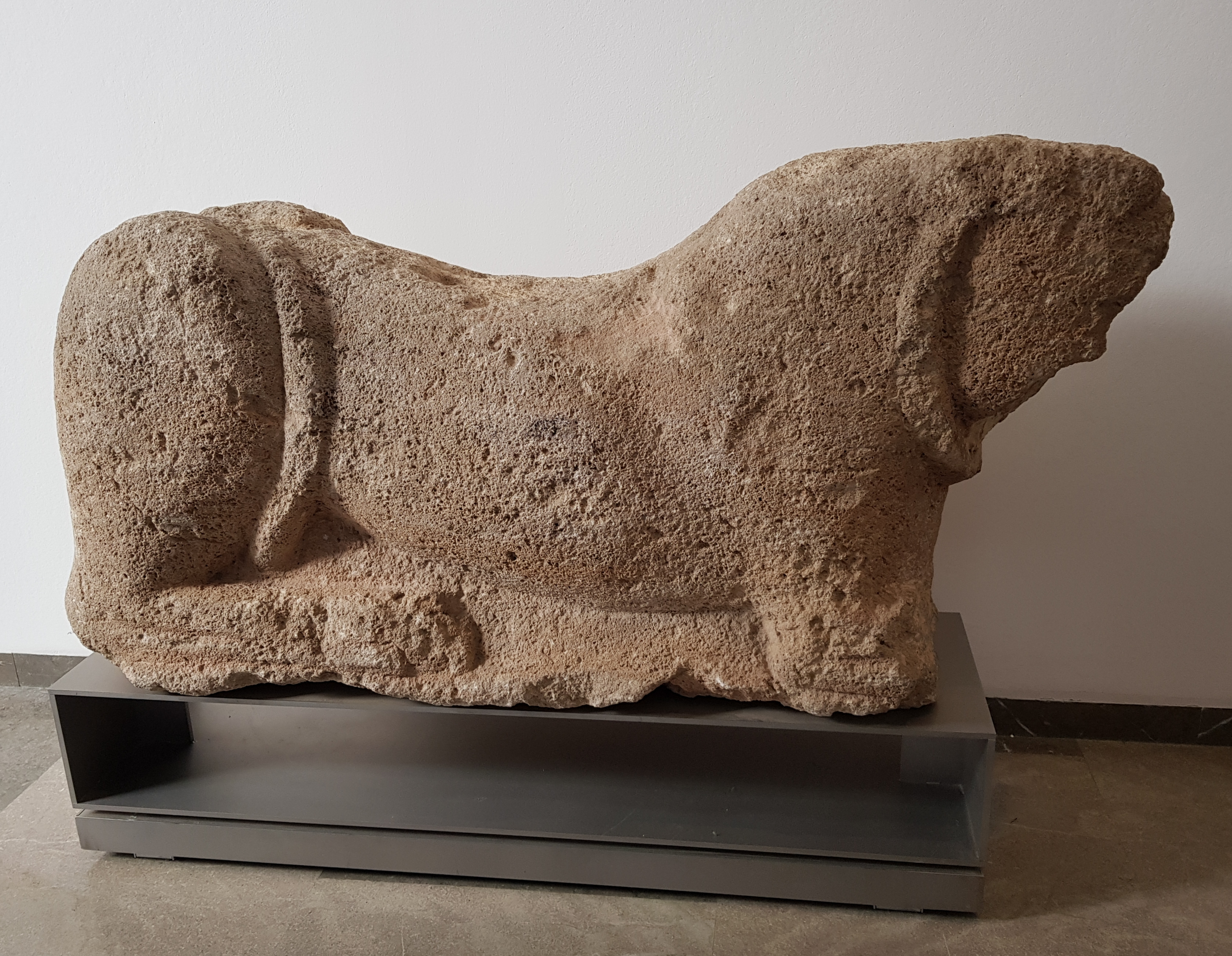
Iberian Lion of Daragoleja

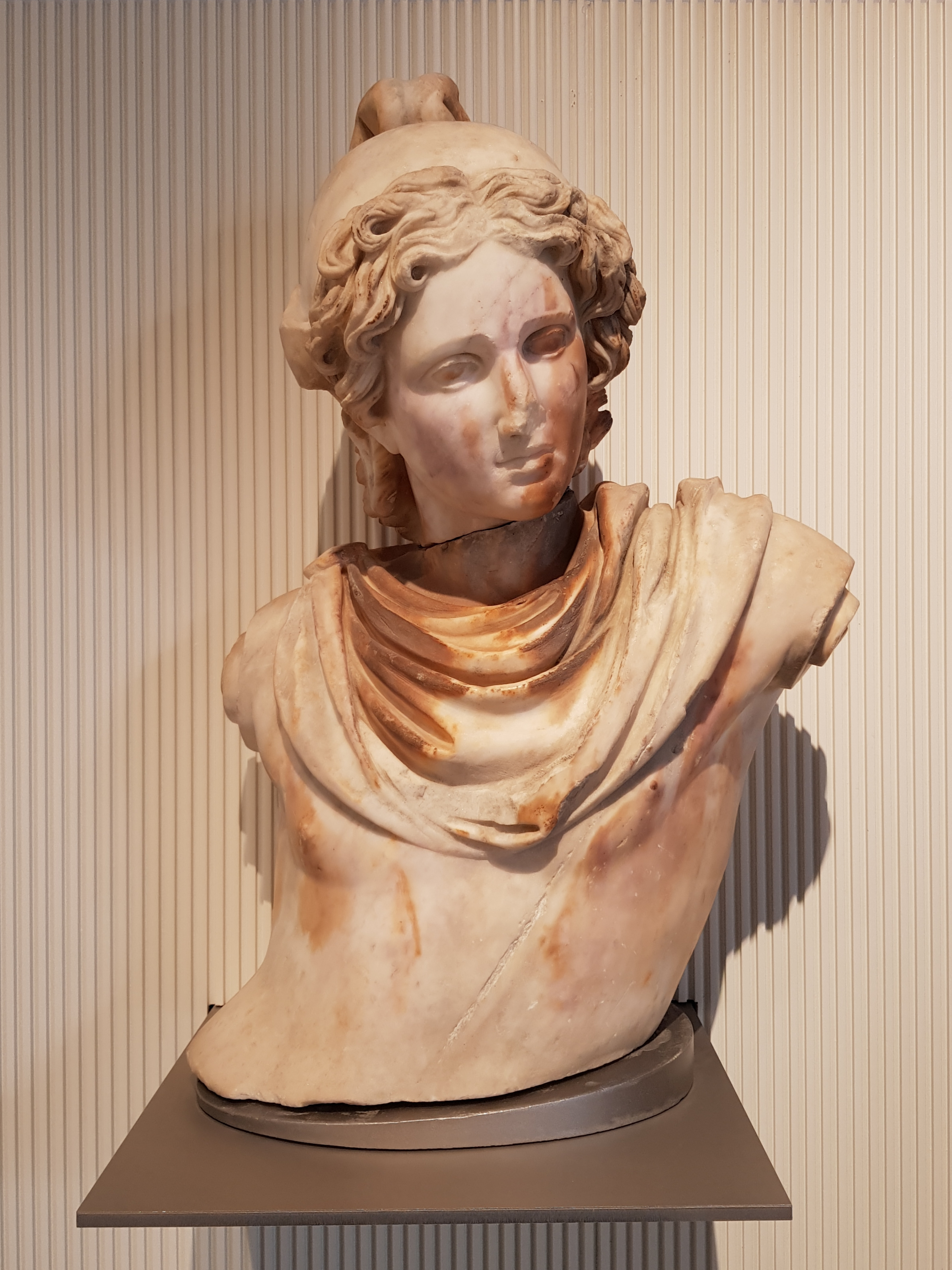
Bust of Ganymede

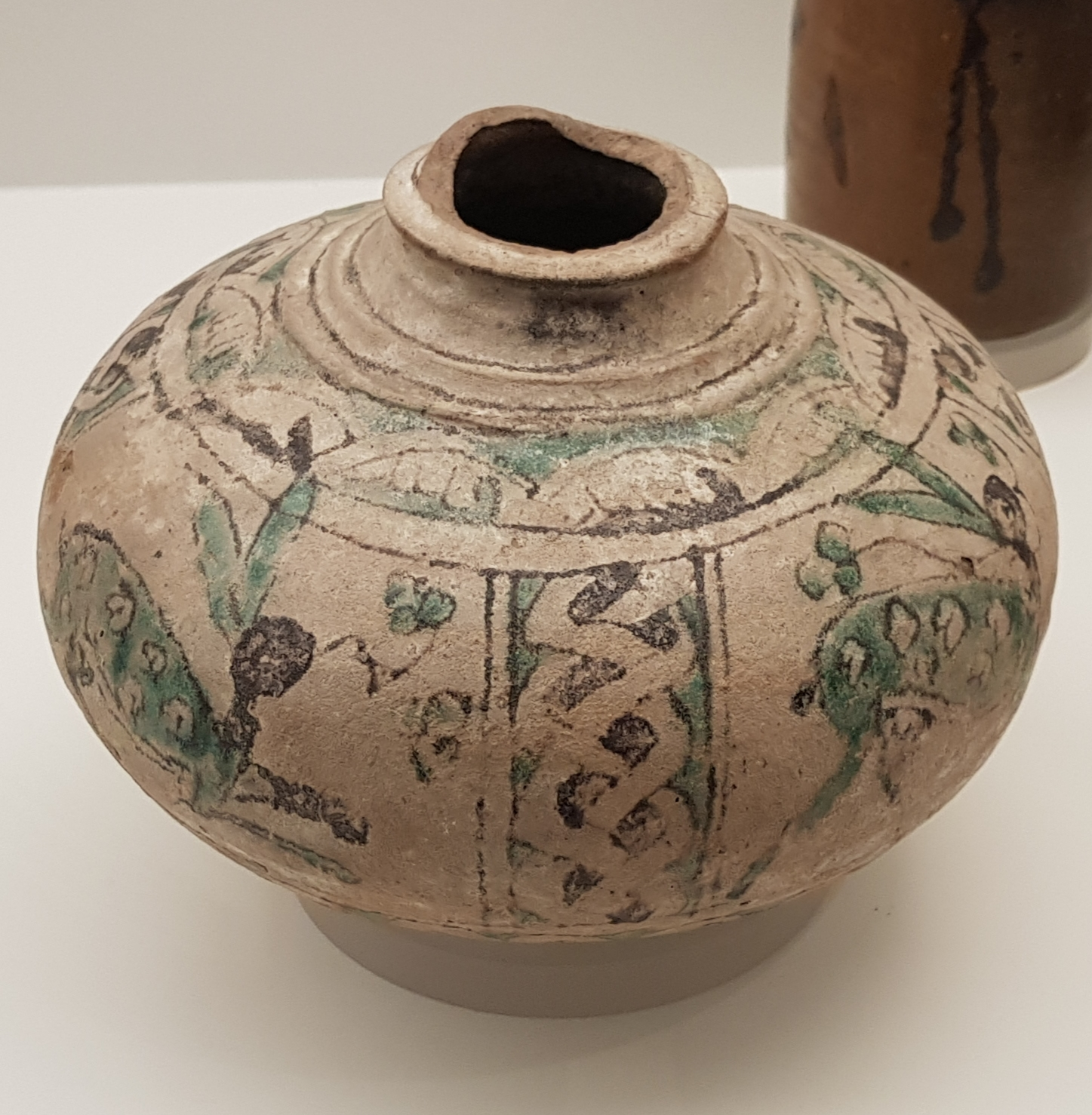
Piece from Medina Elvira (c. 10th century)

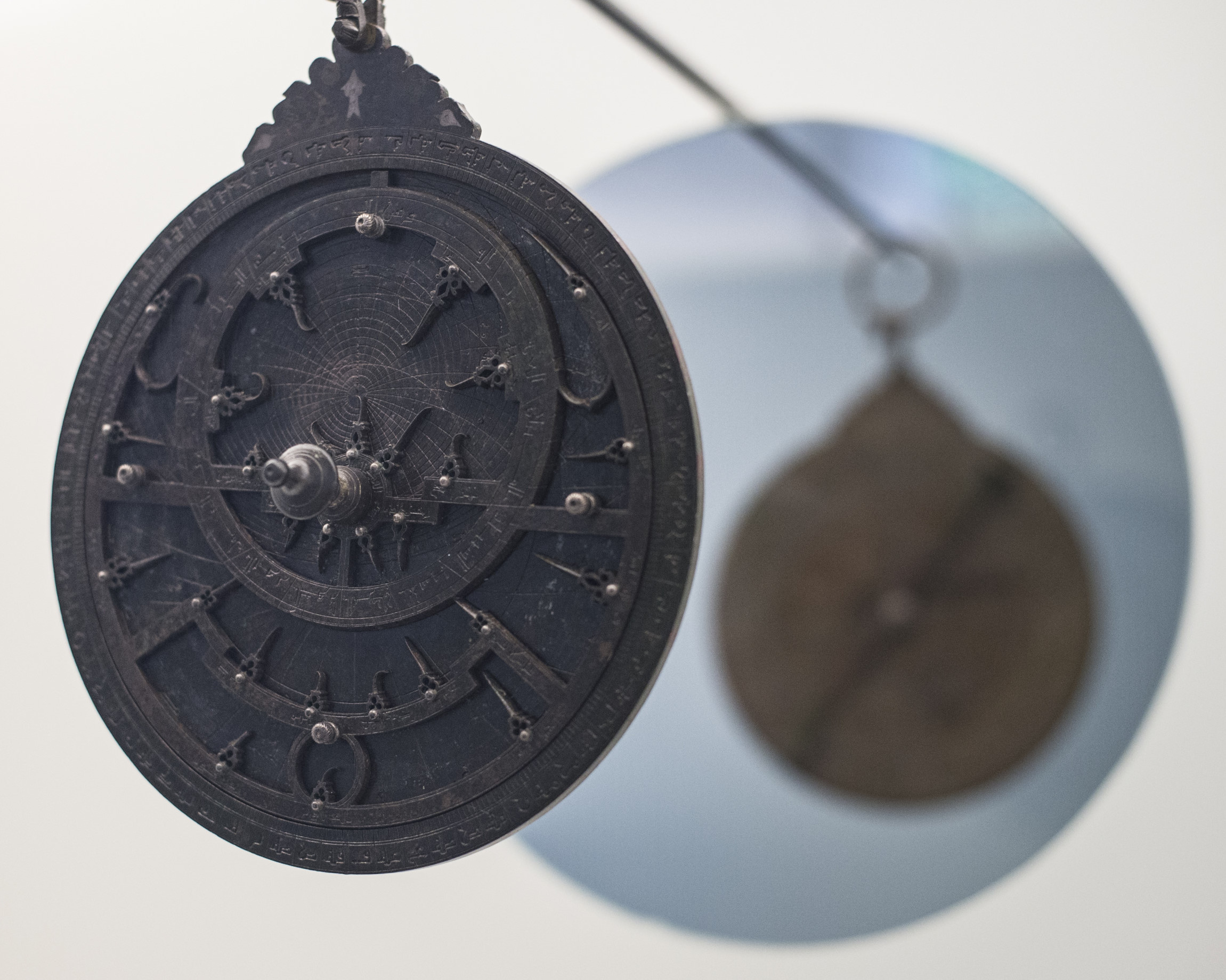
Astrolabe (15th century)

== See also ==
- List of museums in Spain
