= Alhóndiga =

- Municipality
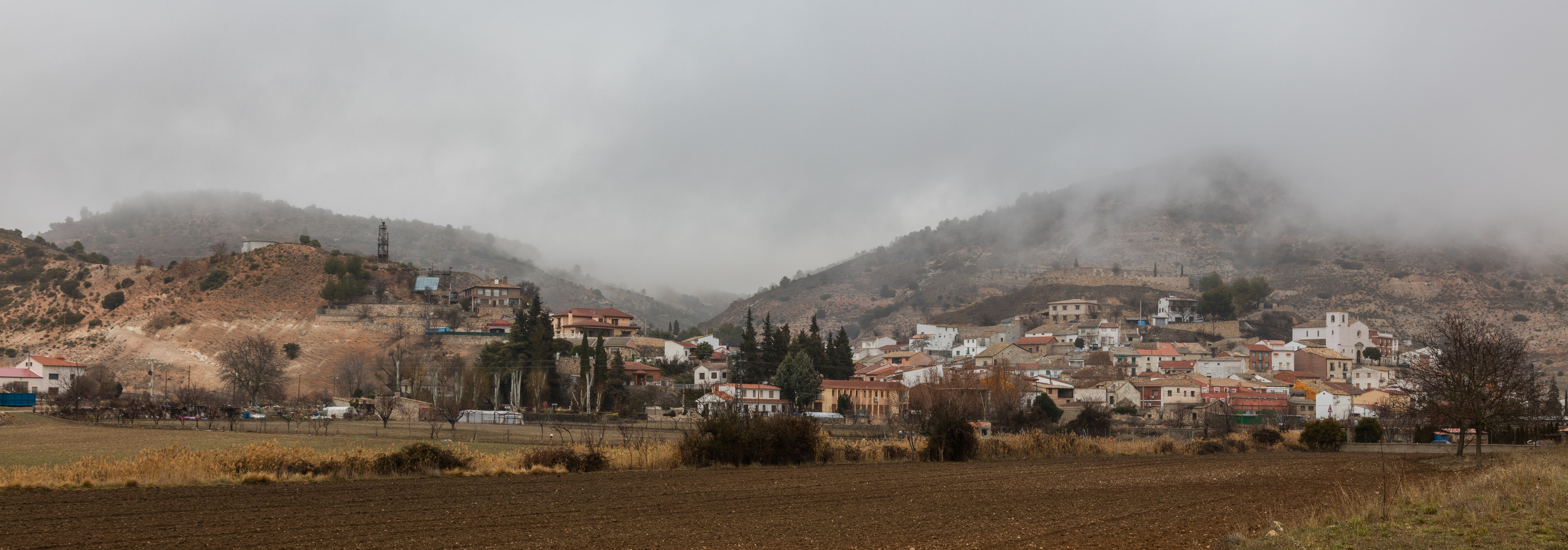

- Flag Coat of arms

- Location within Province of Guadalajara Location within Castilla-La Mancha Location within Spain
- Coordinates: 40°31′37″N 2°49′18″W
- Country: Spain
- Autonomous community: Castilla–La Mancha
- Province: Guadalajara

Area
  - Total: 19.26 km^{2} (7.44 sq mi)

Population (2025-01-01)
  - Total: 185
  - Density: 9.61/km^{2} (24.9/sq mi)
- Time zone: UTC+1 (CET)
  - Summer (DST): UTC+2 (CEST)

Alhóndiga is a municipality located in the province of Guadalajara, Castilla–La Mancha, Spain. As of 1 January 2022 it had a registered population of 158. The municipality spans across a total area of 19.26 km^{2}.

The locality was an early instance of Hospitaller settlement south of the Sistema Central, and it was granted a fuero in 1170. Upon the 1170 donation to the Order of St. John, the previous link of Alhóndiga with Zorita was severed.
