= Isa (name) =

Isa عِيسَى
- Pronunciation: Arabic: [ʕiː.saː]; Turkish: [iːˈsaː]
- Gender: Male
- Language: Arabic

Origin
- Meaning: Salvation

Other names
- Variant forms: İsa (Turkish); Ğəysə (Гайсә, Tatar)
- See also: Isa, Issa, Isse, Esa, Essa, Eissa, Ɛisa Eesa, 'Eesaa

Isa (Arabic: عِيسَى, romanized: ʿĪsā) is a Classical Arabic name ,Prophet isa ,which is the name of Jesus in the Quran.

While its most common association is with the religious context, its meaning outside of this is generally linked to divine blessings, salvation, and gifts from God.

== Etymology ==
The English form of the name "Jesus" is derived from the Latin Iēsus and the Classical Latin INRI (written on the Titulus/placard on the Cross according to John 19:19), which in turn comes from Koine Greek: Ἰησοῦς, romanized: Iēsoûs. The Greek is a Hellenized form of the Hebrew name Yeshuaʿ (Hebrew: ישוע, romanized: Yēšūªˁ, in Western Aramaic dialects like Galilean often pronounced Yəšū), which is in turn a shortened form of Yehoshuaʿ (Hebrew: יהושע, romanized: Yehōšuªˁ, English Joshua. East Syriac liturgy renders the pronunciation of the same letters as Ishoʿ (Classical Syriac: ܝܫܘܥ īšōˁ ). The Peshitta (c. 200) preserves this same spelling.

The Encyclopedia of the Qur'an by Brill Publishers quotes scholarship that notes that the Greek name Iesous, Ἰησοῦς (Iēsoûs), also is known to have represented many different Biblical Hebrew names (which causes issues when seeking to find what Jesus' original Hebrew name would have been from the Greek) "Josephus used the Greek name lesous to denote three people mentioned in the Bible whose Hebrew names were not Yeshuaʿ or Yehoshuaʿ. They were Saul's son Yishwi (Anglicized as 'Ishvi' in the RSV of 1 Samuel 14:49), the Levite Abishua' (mentioned in I Chronicles 6:4, etc.) and Yishwah the son of Asher (Anglicized as 'Ishva' in the RSV of Genesis 46:17). ... Josephus furnishes important evidence for the wide variety of Hebrew names represented in Greek by Iesous."

Also, the classical theologians Clement of Alexandria and Cyril of Jerusalem both stated that the Greek name Iesous was allegedly Jesus' original name.

There is a major discrepancy between the Hebrew and [main] Aramaic form of the name on one side and the [Muslim] Arabic form on the other, since the Hebrew form of this name has the voiced pharyngeal ʿayin ע or ʿayn ع consonant at the end of the name (as does Christian Arabic يسوع Yasūʿ), while the Muslim Arabic form عيسى ʿĪsā has the ʿayn at the beginning of the name. It shares similarities in the vowels with the Eastern Syriac (an Aramaic dialect) version Īshōʿ (ܝܼܫܘܿܥ or ܐܝܼܫܘܿܥ) although it still has the voiced pharyngeal ʿayn consonant at the end of the name.

However, forms with an initial ʿayn (or its reflex) and an apocopated final ʿayn are attested in certain Eastern Aramaic varieties, such as Classical Mandaic, used as liturgical language by the Mandaean community of southern Mesopotamia, where the name for Jesus is rendered ʿ-š-u (ࡏࡔࡅʿĪšū), though the ʿayin is pronounced like a regular long i. Other Aramaic pronunciations of the same name preserve the form Yeshūʿ. Vowels in Semitic languages are somewhat fluid between dialects while consonants are structurally more stable.The dominant consonantal discrepancy remains, between the version yeshuʕ [consonantal y-sh-w-ʕ] and the version ʕīsa [consonantal ʕ-y-s-y].]

Linguists explain the initial pharyngeal ʿayn in Arabic either through metathesis of the final pharyngeal from Eastern Syriac Īšōʿ, or in connection with the ancient Eastern and Central Arabian phonological shift known as ʿanʿana (عنعنة)—attested among tribes such as Tamīm, Qays, and Asad—whereby an initial glottal stop (hamza, ʾ//ʔ/ˀ) was pharyngealized into an ʿayn (ʿ/ʕ/ˁ). According to the Encyclopaedia of the Qurʼān, "Arabic often employs an initial 'ayn in words borrowed from Aramaic or Syriac and the dropping of the final Hebrew ʿayin is evidenced in the form Yisho of the 'koktiirkish' Manichaean fragments from Turfan." This view is also supported by Rudolf Macúch with the example in Classical Mandaic. Another explanation is that prior to the rise of Islam, Christian Arabs had already adopted this form, this is supported by a 4th-century CE pre-Islamic Safaitic inscription in Jordan attesting the form ʿsy, the earliest archaeological evidence of an Arabic name for Jesus. Enno Littman (1950) states: "Mr. G. Lankaster Harding, Chief Curator of Antiquities Hashimite Kingdom of Jordan, kindly sent me copies of a little more than five hundred Thamudic inscriptions. [...] It is the inscription [Harding No. 476] that interests us here. [...] Below the circle there are four letters: a y, a sh, a ʿ, and again a y." He also states: "These letters are so placed that they can be read from right to left or from left to right y-sh-ʿ, probably pronounced Yashaʿ, and this name is the same as Yashuaʿ, the Hebrew form of the name of Christ." An archaic Arabic root for 'Salvation' exists in Yathaʿ, which may have later formed this name: y-sh-ʿ. The lack of a Waw is still unexplained. Scholar Alphonse Mingana writes there may have been a monastery named ʿĪsāniyya in the territory of the Christian Ghassanid Arabs in southern Syria as early as 571 CE.

Also the name Yeshu (ישו in Hebrew and Aramaic) lacking the final ʿayin is also used to refer to Jesus in the Jewish work the Toledot Yeshu, and scholar David Flusser presents evidence Yeshu was also a name itself rather than claims it was meant to supposedly be an acronym to insult Jesus. The Brill Encyclopedia of the Qurʾan notes scholar Anis al-Assiouty as noting the fact that „In the Talmud, however, he (Jesus) is called Yeshu.“ Scholar David Flusser and other scholars like Adolf Neubauer, Hugh J. Schonfield, and Joachim Jeremias also further argued that the name or pronunciation Yeshu (ישו in Hebrew and Aramaic) could also be "the Galilean pronunciation" of Yeshuaʿ that came about because of an inability to pronounce the 'ayin in the Galilee region where Jesus came from. Scholars have been puzzled by the use of ʿĪsā in the Qurʾan since most Christians in Arabia used yasūʿ before and after Islam, itself derived from the [Western] Syriac formYəšūʿ and ultimately Hebrew Yešūaʿ by a phonetic change. The Encyclopedia of the Qur'an by Brill Publishers states this has also come about because many Western scholars have held a "conviction that Jesus' authentic Hebrew name is Yeshuaʿ" and because of this they often "have been puzzled by the Qurʾan's reference to him as ʿIsa". Brill's Encyclopedia of the Qurʾan further states „It is not certain that Jesus' original name was Yeshuaʿ“ However, the early [western] Syriac/Aramaic form of the name Yeshuaʿ, the etymological link with 'salvation' (note the Hebrew consonantal root y-š-ʿ) in Matthew 1:21, all of the correspondences of Ἰησοῦς in the Greek OT and Second Temple Jewish writings, and the common attestation of Yeshuaʿ among first century Jewish names have led to a consensus among scholars of the gospels that Yeshuaʿ was Jesus' original name. Another explanation is that Muhammad adopted Isa from the polemical Jewish form Esau (עשו ʿĒsāw) However, there is no evidence that the Jews have ever used Esau to refer to Jesus, and if Muhammad had unwittingly adopted a pejorative form his many Christian acquaintances would have corrected him. ʿEsau (and derivatives with ʿayin as a first letter) is not a realistic possibility. With all this in mind, some scholars have proposed several explanations. James A. Bellamy of the University of Michigan suggested that the quranic name is a corruption of Masīḥ itself derived from Yasūʿ, suggesting that this resulted from a copyist error and an attempt to conceal the Arabic verb sāʿa/yasūʿu which has obscene connotations, though no evidence has been found to support this claim.

Josef Horovitz on the other hand holds that the Quranic form is meant to parallel Mūsā (Moses). Similar pairs are also frequently found in the Qurʾan as well which supports this theory. For example, compare Ismā‘īl and Ibrāhīm (Anglicised Ishmael and Abraham), Jālūt and Tālūt (Goliath and Saul), Yājuj and Mājuj (Gog and Magog), and Qābil and Hābil (Cain and Abel). It is thus possible that the Arabs referred to him as Yasaʿ, but the Quran reversed the letters to parallel Mūsā.

Another explanation given is that in ancient Mesopotamia divine names were written in one way and pronounced in another. Thus borrowed words can have their consonants reversed.

Christoph Luxenberg's The Syro-Aramaic Reading of the Koran equates the quranic name with Hebrew Jesse. However, neither Yeshu nor Jesse begins with a pharyngeal consonant in their original Hebrew forms.

== Non-Islamic uses ==
A 14th-century Persian translation of Matthew, one of the earliest surviving Persian manuscripts of the scripture, uses Isa. Ahmad Al-Jallad has argued that a precedent of the quranic name ʿsy was already used in a Christian Safaitic inscription from the fourth century. Later translations in other languages also follow suit. Some evangelical Arabic translations of the Bible also use Isa, such as David Owen's Life of Christ (Arabic 1987).

== Given name ==
=== Literature ===
- Isa Hasan al-Yasiri, (1942) Iraqi-Canadian poet

=== Religious people ===
- Isa ibn Maryam, last Israelite prophet and penultimate prophet in Islam
- Isa ibn Aban (died 836), early Muslim scholar of Second Islamic century during the early Abbasid era.
- Isa Qassim (born 1937), Bahraini Shia cleric

=== Politics and military ===
- Isa ibn Musa, (d. 783) was the Arab statesman, nephew of Abbasid caliph al-Saffah (r. 750–754) and Al-Mansur (r. 754–775).
- Isa ibn Abdallah al-Mansur (b. 760s) was the son of Abbasid caliph al-Mansur (r. 754–775)
- Isa Alptekin (1901–1995), Uyghur political leader
- Isa Boletini (1864–1916), Albanian nationalist
- İsa Çelebi (died 1406), Ottoman prince
- Isa Dongoyaro (1977–2024), Nigerian politician
- Isa Gambar (born 1957), Azerbaijani politician
- Isa Bey Ishaković, 15th-century Ottoman general
- Isa beg Isabegović, one of the largest landowners of the 19th century Bosnian aristocracy
- İsa Kaykun (born 1988), Turkish footballer
- Isa Kelemechi (ca. 13th century), Church of the East scientist and diplomat
- Isa Khan (1529–1599), 16th-century Bengali noble and military leader
- Isa Mustafa (born 1951), Kosovar politician
- Ma Qixi (1857–1914), Chinese Muslim Xidaotang leader, also known as Ersa (Isa)
- Isa ibn al-Shaykh al-Shaybani (died 882/3), Arab tribal leader
- Isa bin Salman Al Khalifa (1931–1999), Emir of Bahrain
- Isa Kahraman (born 1974), Turkish-born Dutch politician

=== Sports ===
- Isa Guha (born 1985), Indian female cricketer
- Isa Аskhabovich Chaniev (born 1992), Russian lightweight boxer

=== Music ===
- Isa Tengblad (born 1998), Swedish singer

=== Others ===
- İsa Şahmarlı (ca. 1993 – 2014), Azerbaijani LGBT activist

=== Fictional characters ===
- Isa, the original identity of Saïx from the Kingdom Hearts series
- Isa the Iguana, a character in Dora the Explorer
- Isa Drennan, a main character in the Scottish sitcom Still Game

== Derived name ==
- Umm Isa bint Musa al-Hadi, was the Abbasid princess, daughter of caliph al-Hadi (r. 785–786) and wife of caliph al-Ma'mun (r. 813–833).

== Surname ==
- Abu Isa, Isaac ben Jacob al-Isfahani, Jewish prophet
- Ali ibn Isa al-Asturlabi, Arab astronomer
- Ali ibn Isa al-Kahhal, Arab ophthalmologist
- Dolkun Isa, Uyghur activist
- Facundo Isa (born 1993), Argentine rugby player
- Isabegović, Isajbegović or Isabegzade, Bosnian noble family after Isa-bey Ishaković Hranić
- Ismail Isa (born 1989), Bulgarian footballer
- Mursal Isa (born 1981), Somalia-born Swedish politician
- Qazi Faez Isa (born 1959), justice at the Supreme Court of Pakistan
- Qazi Muhammad Isa (1914–1976)
- Salman Isa (born 1977), Bahraini footballer

== Variations ==
Variations of the name include Ğaysə (Tatar: Гайсә) and Ğaysa (Bashkir: Ғайса); in Russian transcript as Гайса, Айса (Aysa) or Айся (Aisya). As a surname in Russia the name morphs into Айсин / Гайсин (Aysin / Gaysin). In Tamazight (for example Taqbaylit) the name is ⵄⵉⵙⴰ, Ɛisa.

- Gaisa Enikeev (1864–1931), Tatar/Bashkir ethnographer, politician
- Gaisa Khusainov (1928–2021) Bashkir writer, scientist
- Aisa Hakimcan (1896–1972), Tatar artist in Finland
- Ruslan Aisin (born 1980), Tatar activist, political scientist

== See also ==
- Isabella (given name)
- Yeshua

== Bibliography ==
- Reynolds, Gabriel Said (29 November 2007). The Quran in its Historical Context. Taylor & Francis. ISBN 978-0-415-42899-6.
- Beaumont, Ivor Mark (1 January 2005). Christology in Dialogue with Muslims: A Critical Analysis of Christian Presentations of Christ for Muslims from the Ninth and Twentieth Centuries. Oxford Centre for Mission Studies. ISBN 978-1-870345-46-0.
