= Bimaristan =

Healthcare center in the Islamic World

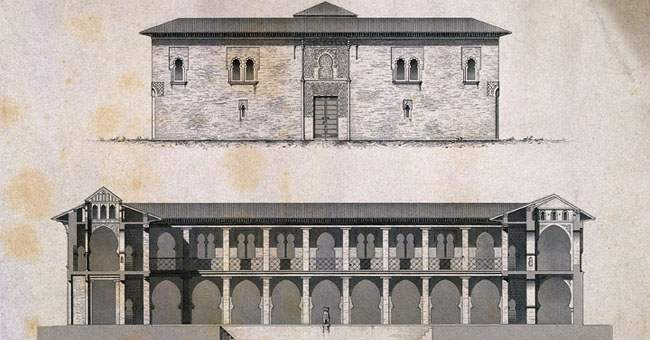
Reconstruction of the Nasrid Bimaristan of Granada, in Spain (former al-Andalus)

A bimaristan (Persian: بيمارستان, romanized: bīmārestān; Arabic: بِيْمَارِسْتَان, romanized: bīmāristān), or simply maristan, known in Arabic as dar al-shifa ("house of healing"; darüşşifa in Turkish), is a hospital in the medieval Islamic world.

== Etymology ==
Bimarestān is a New Persian word inherited from the Middle Persian wēmārestān (𐭥𐭩𐭬𐭠𐭫𐭮𐭲𐭠𐭭), from wēmār "sick, ill person" plus the suffix -stan "place, location."

In English literature, the term designates institutions of medicine in the medieval Islamic world. It is still used sometimes in languages of Persianate societies to refer to modern hospitals or specific types of medical institutions.

== Origins ==
Many centers of health in antiquity helped shape the ways Muslim scholars would pursue the study and advancement of medical science.

Mobile hospitals were the first version of the bimaristans. These mobile versions carried medications, food, and water, and traveled with physicians and pharmacists to aid those in need. According to tradition, the first mobile bimaristan was set up in a tent by Rufaidah al-Aslamia in 627 CE during the Battle of Khandaq. Later on, these mobile care centers would evolve from one or two tents to enormous units of medical care equipped with medicinal herbs, food, physicians, and pharmacists. Under the Seljuq Sultanate reign of Muhammad Saljuqi, a single mobile care center required 40 camels for transportation. The idea was to be able to better extend medical care to rural communities that lived on the outskirts of major cities. The services provided from the mobile hospitals transitioned into the other Islamic hospitals as time went on.

The Umayyad caliph al-Walid I is sometimes credited with establishing the first permanent bimaristan in the Islamic world in Damascus in 707, but this has been disputed by historians. The claim is largely based on the writings of later medieval historians such as al-Tabari (d. 923) and al-Maqrizi (d. 1442). Modern historians Michael W. Dols and Douglas Morton Dunlop concluded that some of the early historical sources suggest that al-Walid I created something like a leprosarium (a segregated hospice for lepers) rather than a hospital, consistent with contemporary Byzantine practices. Historian Lawrence Conrad concluded that al-Walid did not establish a hospital, and this view was accepted by multiple other historians, including Peregrine Horden and Peter E. Pormann. More recently, Ahmad Ragab argued that there is no evidence that al-Walid's foundation resembled the later bimaristans of the Islamic world, which were more sophisticated medical institutions, but that there is evidence he would have established charitable institutions offering shelter for lepers, the blind, and the handicapped. These likely continued or competed with existing Byzantine charitable institutions of the era and may have formed a precedent that was continued by later Muslim institutions.

The first bimaristan proper was more likely the one founded by the Abbasid caliph Harun al-Rashid (r. 786–809) in Baghdad. This foundation was inspired by the hospital and medical school of Gundeshapur in Khuzistan (present-day Iran), which had been established since the Sasanian period and had brought together the medical traditions of ancient Greece, Iran, and India. According to the traditional narrative, Harun al-Rashid summoned from Geundeshapur a Christian doctor named Jibril ibn Bakhtishu, whom he charged with establishing a state hospital in 787. The details of this story have been questioned by Dols, who argues the hospital may have actually been founded by the Barmakid vizier Yahya ibn Khalid under al-Rashid. Nonetheless, he notes that historical records demonstrate that state hospitals were already a well-known feature of the Abbasid realm by the first decades of the 9th century. Ragab also questions the accuracy of the traditional account but notes that the bimaristan was evidently a well-known institution in Baghdad in the 9th and 10th centuries.

Though the Islamic realm was very large, Baghdad, Damascus, and Cairo housed the most well-known bimaristans for much of their history.

== Features ==
=== Admission and treatment of all ===
As hospitals developed during the Islamic civilization, specific characteristics were maintained. For instance, Bimaristans served people regardless of their race, religion, citizenship, or gender. The waqf documents instructed that nobody should be turned away; this included those with mental illnesses or disorders. In Aleppo's Arghun Hospital, for example, care for mental illness included abundant light, fresh air, running water, and music. Physicians and hospital staff aimed to work together to help the well-being of their patients.

Inpatients were not given a time limit. Instead, waqf documents stated that the hospital was required to care for patients until full recovery. Male and female wards were separate but equally equipped. These wards were further divided to attend to mental illnesses, contagious diseases, non-contagious diseases, surgery, medicine, and eye diseases. Patients were treated by nurses and staff of their same gender. Each hospital contained a lecture hall, kitchen, pharmacy, library, mosque, and occasionally a chapel for Christian patients. Recreational materials and musicians were often employed to comfort and cheer patients up.

=== Hygiene ===
The Qur'an provided the basis for the development of professional ethics. The rise of washing to attain ritual purity in Islam and in Judaism also influenced the importance of hygiene in medical practice. The importance of hygiene promotes healthy lifestyles and cuts down on disease by enticing communities to create hygienic infrastructures. Bimaristans promoted hygiene by regularly bathing patients and staff, providing clean bedding and medical materials, and through their architecture, which promoted air circulation and bright, open lighting. Pharmacies were periodically visited by government inspectors called muhtasib, who checked to see that the medicines were mixed properly, not diluted, and kept in clean jars. Additionally, Muhammad ibn Zakariya al-Razi, who was once asked to choose the site for a new hospital in Baghdad, suspended pieces of meat at various points around the city and recommended building the hospital at the location where the meat putrefied the slowest.

=== Education ===
The various Quranic injunctions and Hadith (or actions of Muhammad), which place value on education and emphasize the importance of acquiring knowledge, played a vital role in influencing the Muslims of this age in their search for knowledge and the development of the body of science.

Bimaristans were not only used to provide care for individuals. They were also educational institutions meant to advance medical students' knowledge in the medical field, especially in cities like Baghdad, Damascus, and Cairo. Some madrasas were also closely linked with bimaristans, so that students could learn in the institutions and put their theoretical knowledge directly into practice. Basic science preparation was learned through private tutors, self-study, and lectures. Many of these hospitals also contained a conjoined library typically filled with any possible writings that may be relevant to the medicine practiced in the hospitals.

Physicians in these proto-medical schools were not exclusively Muslim; Jewish and Christian physicians also practiced and taught. In the major hospitals at Cairo, Baghdad, and Damascus, students often visited patients while under the supervision of a practicing physician—a system comparable to a medical residency today. Like in today's medical training programs, working and learning in the bimaristans under the supervision of practicing physicians allowed medical students to gain hands-on experience treating various ailments and responding to a multitude of situations.

During this era, physician licensure became mandatory in the Abbasid Caliphate. In 931 CE, Caliph Al-Muqtadir learned of the death of one of his subjects as a result of a physician's error. He immediately ordered his muhtasib Sinan ibn Thabit to examine and prevent doctors from practicing until they passed an examination. From this time on, licensing exams were required and only qualified physicians were allowed to practice medicine.

The early Islamicate empires translated the work of early pre-Islamic times from empires such as Rome, Greece, Pahlavi, and Sanskrit into Arabic. Before this translation, the work had been lost, and perhaps it may have been lost forever. The discovery of this new information exposed the Islamicate empires to large amounts of scientific research and discoveries. Arabs translated a variety of different topics throughout science, including Greek and Roman research in medicine and pharmacology. Translated artifacts, such as medical dictionaries and books containing information on hygiene and sexual intercourse, are still preserved. Perhaps one of the most notable translated pieces is a human anatomy book translated from Greek to Arabic by Muslim physician Avicenna. The book was used in schools in the West until the mid-17th century.

== Function and organization ==
One of the most remarkable contributions of the Islamic hospitals was the organizational structure itself and how it functioned in Islamic culture. These contributions still influence contemporary medical practice. For example, bimaristans kept written records of patients and their medical treatment—the first written medical histories for patients. Students were responsible for keeping these patient records, which were later edited by doctors and referenced in future treatments.

The first documented general hospital arose in Baghdad in 805, built by the caliph Harun al-Rashid and his vizier, Yahya ibn Khalid. Although not much is known about this hospital due to poor documentation, the system of the general hospital itself set forth an example for the many other hospitals to come. By the year 1000, Baghdad had five more hospitals. As new hospitals were built throughout the Islamic world, they followed similar organizational structures to the hospital in Baghdad.

The typical hospital was divided into departments such as systemic diseases, surgery, and orthopedics, with larger hospitals having more diverse specialties. "Systemic diseases" was the rough equivalent of today's internal medicine and was further divided into sections such as fever, infections, and digestive issues. Every department had an officer-in-charge, a presiding officer and a supervising specialist. The hospitals also had lecture theaters and libraries. Hospitals staff included sanitary inspectors who regulated cleanliness, accountants, and other administrative staff. The hospitals were typically run by a three-person board comprising a non-medical administrator, the chief pharmacist, called the shaykh saydalani, who was equal in rank to the chief physician, who served as mutwalli (dean). Medical facilities traditionally closed each night, but by the 10th century laws had been passed to keep hospitals open 24 hours a day.

Both men and women worked in these hospitals, including as physicians, but hospital staff had work in a range of professions. Much like today's hospitals, they also relied on pharmacists, nurses, sanitary inspectors, supervising specialists, secretaries, and superintendents. The superintendents, or in Arabic, sa'ur, ensured that hospitals met certain standards in addition to managing the entire hospital institution. Pharmacists produced drugs as means for treatment of the hospitals' patients; they relied on a knowledge of chemistry, or Alchemia.

Before the 10th century, hospitals operated throughout the day and closed at night. Later, hospitals operated on a 24-hour basis. Nonetheless, the practicing physicians worked a set number of hours with their salaries prescribed by law; the physicians were paid generously enough so as to retain their talent. Chief of staff physician, Jabril ibn Bukhtishu, was salaried 4.9 million Dirham; for comparison, a medical resident worked significantly longer hours salaried at 300 Dirham per month.

Islamic hospitals attained their endowment through charitable donations or bequests, called a waqf. The legal documents establishing a waqf also set forth rules for how the hospital should be organized and operate in relation to the patient, stating that anyone could be admitted regardless of race, gender, or citizenship. Patients of all socioeconomic statuses would have had access to full treatment, as all costs were borne by the hospital itself. An example was the Al-Mansuri Hospital in Cairo, built under the orders of the Mamluk ruler of Egypt, Al-Mansur Qalawun. Its maximum capacity was around 8000 people and the annual endowment alone was said to be one-million Dirhams. The design was intended to accommodate various pathologies for both men and women, as well as a pharmacy, a library, and lecture halls. The lecture halls were used for regular meetings on the status of the hospital, lecturing residents, and staff as well.

== Notable Islamic hospitals ==
=== Baghdad ===
The existence of hospitals in Baghdad has been documented since the 9th century CE, with the first having most likely been established by the caliph Harun al-Rashid and his vizier, Yahya ibn Khalid. It is considered the first fully integrated hospital in history and one of the oldest comprehensive healthcare institutions that combined medical care, education, and scientific research. It is estimated to have remained operational until at least the early 13th century CE. By the end of the 10th century CE, five more hospitals had been built in Baghdad.

==== Al-Adudi Hospital ====
Founded in 981 by the then ruler of Baghdad, Adud al-Dawlah, this hospital was administered by al-Razi, who also chose its location along the Tigris River. He determined where it should be located by "hanging a piece of meat in several places for a few days and deciding in favor of the place where meat was found to be least infected." At its inception, the Al-Adudi Hospital had twenty-five staff members, specializing in fields ranging from optics to surgery. In addition to these specialists, the Al-Adudi Hospital also served as a teaching hospital for new doctors. The Al-Adudi Hospital remained operational into the 12th century CE when, in 1184, it was described as "...being like an enormous palace in size." Ultimately, the Al-Adudi Hospital was destroyed in 1258 by Mongols led by Hulagu Khan in the siege of Baghdad.

=== Cairo ===
==== Al-Fustat Hospital ====
One of the first Egyptian hospitals was the Al-Fustat Hospital, which was founded in 872 CE. It was founded by Ahmed ibn Tulun and located in Fustat, in what is now modern Cairo. The Al-Fustat Hospital shared many common features with modern hospitals. Among these were bath houses separated by gender, separate wards, and the safekeeping of personal items during a patient's convalescence. In addition to these practices, the Al-Fustat Hospital is the first to have offered treatment for mental disorders. Beyond the practice of medicine, the Al-Fustat Hospital was also a teaching hospital and housed approximately 100,000 books. Another key feature of the Al-Fustat Hospital was that it offered all treatment for free. This was made possible by waqf revenue, and the Al-Fustat Hospital was likely the first hospital endowed in this way. Near the Al-Fustat Hospital, Ibn Tulun also established a pharmacy to provide medical care in emergencies. The Al-Fustat Hospital remained in operation for approximately 600 years.

==== Al-Mansuri Hospital ====
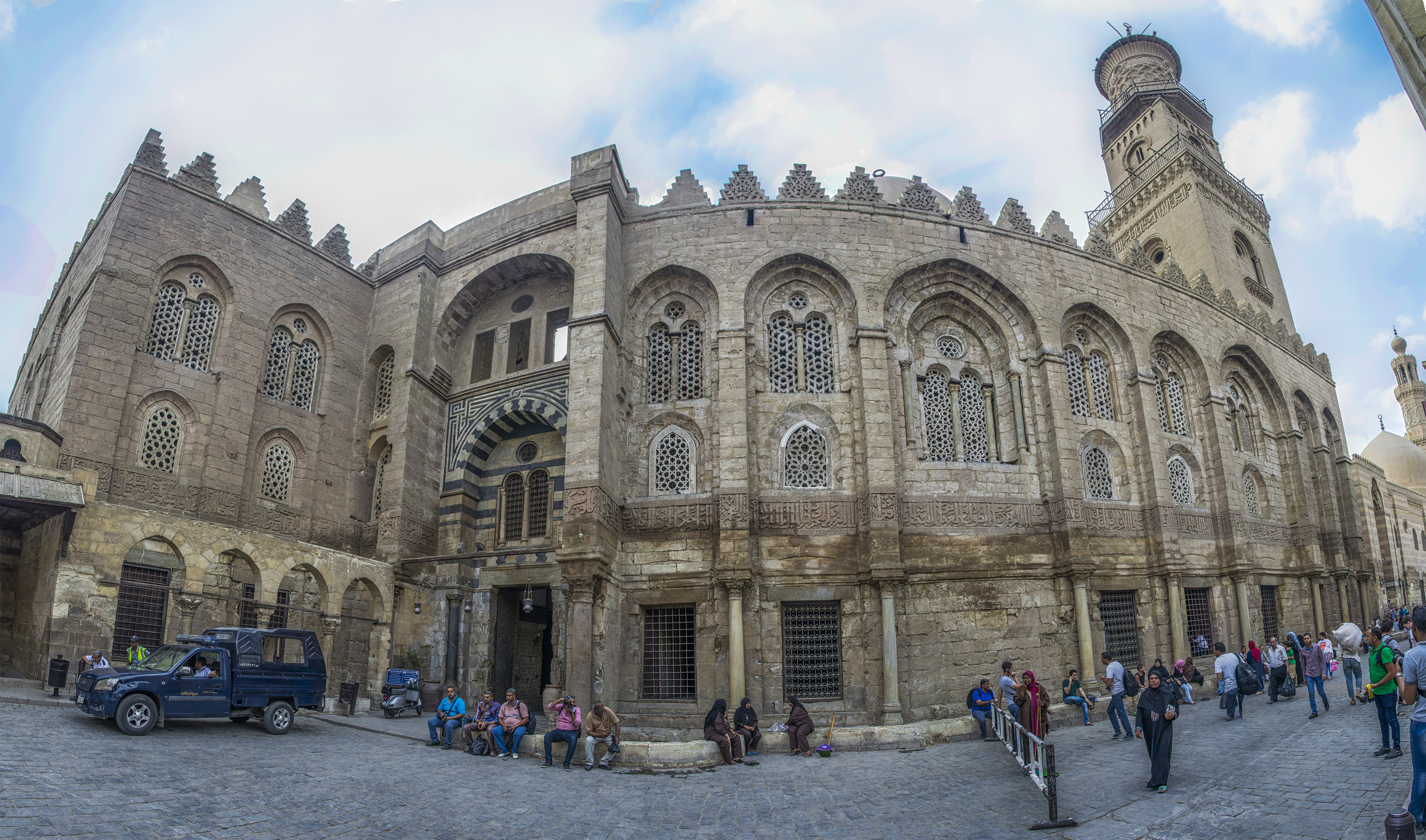
Sultan al-Mansur Qalawun's funerary complex in Cairo, Egypt, whose main component was a famous bimaristan (partly ruined today)

The Al-Mansuri Hospital was another hospital located in Cairo, and was completed in 1284 CE. Its founder, Al-Mansur Qalawun, was inspired to establish a hospital after his own experience being hospitalized in Damascus. Because of Al-Mansur's vision for the hospital, treatment was free to make the hospital accessible to both the rich and the poor. Furthermore, "...upon discharge the patient was given food and money as a compensation for the wages he lost during his stay in the hospital." The hospital also accepted patient of all social and religious background, having both the chapel for Christians and the mosque. The Al-Mansuri Hospital was so accessible, in fact, that it treated roughly 4,000 patients every day. The Al-Mansuri Hospital was a groundbreaking institution and acted as a model for future bimaristans to come.

The Al-Mansuri Hospital was substantial, both in size and endowments. This hospital had the capability of holding 8000 beds and was funded off of annual endowments totaling one million dirhams. Like the Al-Fustat Hospital before it, the Al-Mansuri Hospital also treated mental patients and introduced music as a form of therapy. The Al-Mansuri also obtained the personal library of Ibn al-Nafis upon his death in 1258. The Al-Mansuri Hospital remained operational through the 15th century CE and still stands in Cairo today, though it is now known as "Mustashfa Qalawun."

=== Al-Nuri Hospital in Damascus ===
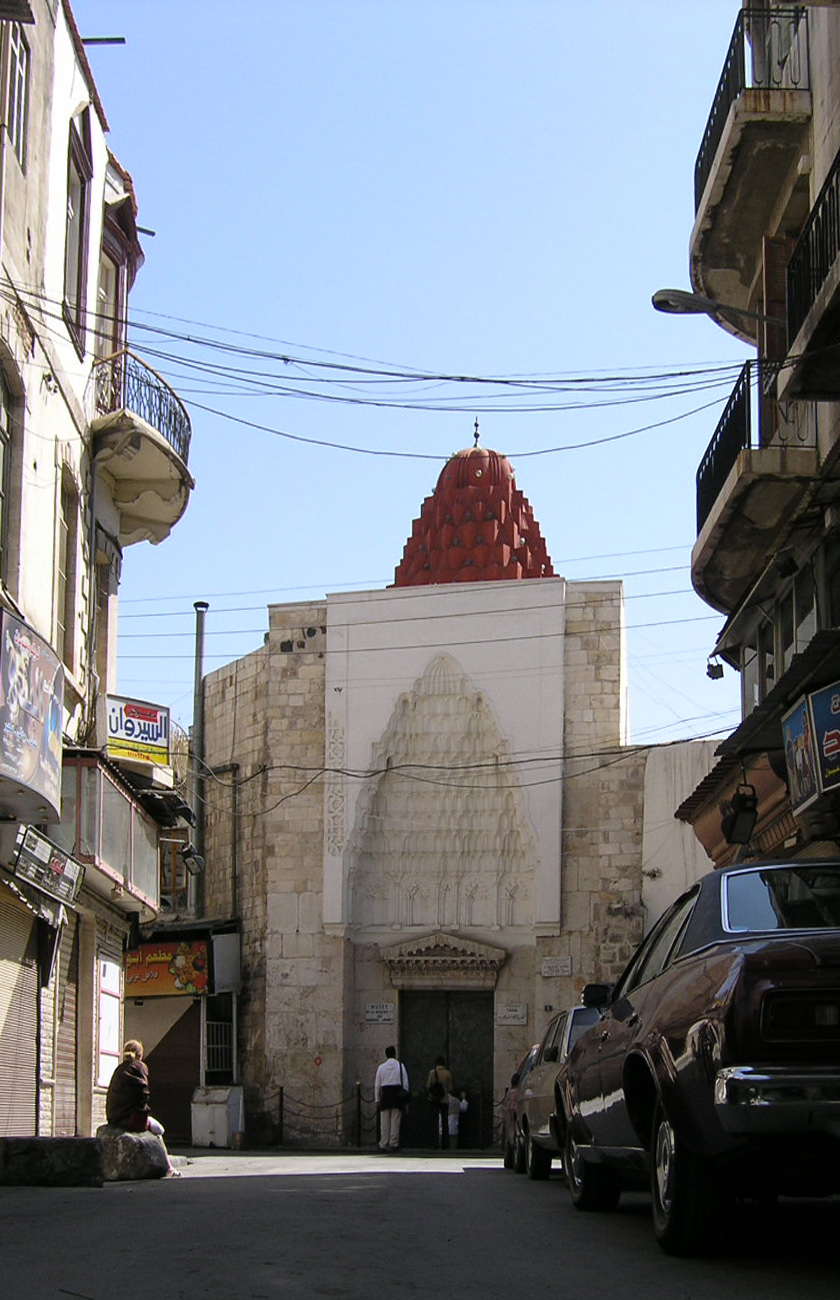
Entrance portal of the Nur al-Din Bimaristan in Damascus, Syria

The Bimaristan of Nur al-Din, or Al-Nuri Hospital, was founded in Damascus in 1156 CE. It is named after its founder Nur al-Din Zengi. The Al-Nuri Hospital, which operated for some 700 years, was the same hospital where Al-Mansur Qalawun was treated and inspired to establish his own hospital in Cairo. The Al-Nuri Hospital, in addition to bringing about the Al-Mansuri hospital, was innovative in its practices as it became the first hospital to begin maintaining medical records of its patients. The Al-Nuri Hospital was also a prestigious medical school, with one of its most noteworthy students being Ibn al-Nafis, who would later pioneer the theory of pulmonary circulation.

=== Other notable bimaristans in the Islamic world ===
- Maristan of Sidi Frej in Fes, Morocco
- The Nasrid Bimaristan of Granada, Spain
- Maristan of al-Mu'ayyad, Cairo, Egypt
- Divriği Great Mosque's adjoining Turan Melek Sultan Darüşşifa in Divriği, Turkey
- Sultan Bayezid II complex in Edirne, Turkey
- Darüşşifa and Medrese (medical school) of Gevher Nesibe in Kayseri, Turkey
- Şifaiye Medrese (medical school) and Darüşşifa in Sivas, Turkey

==== Gallery of other bimaristans ====
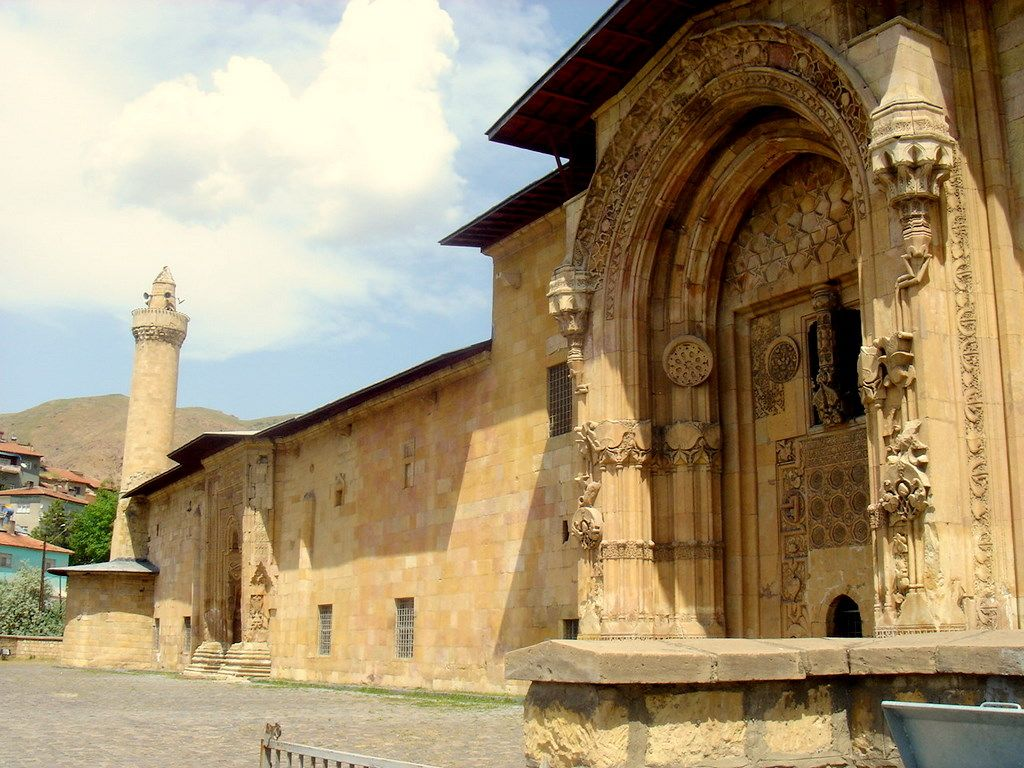
The Hospital (Darüşşifa) and Great Mosque in Divriği, Turkey

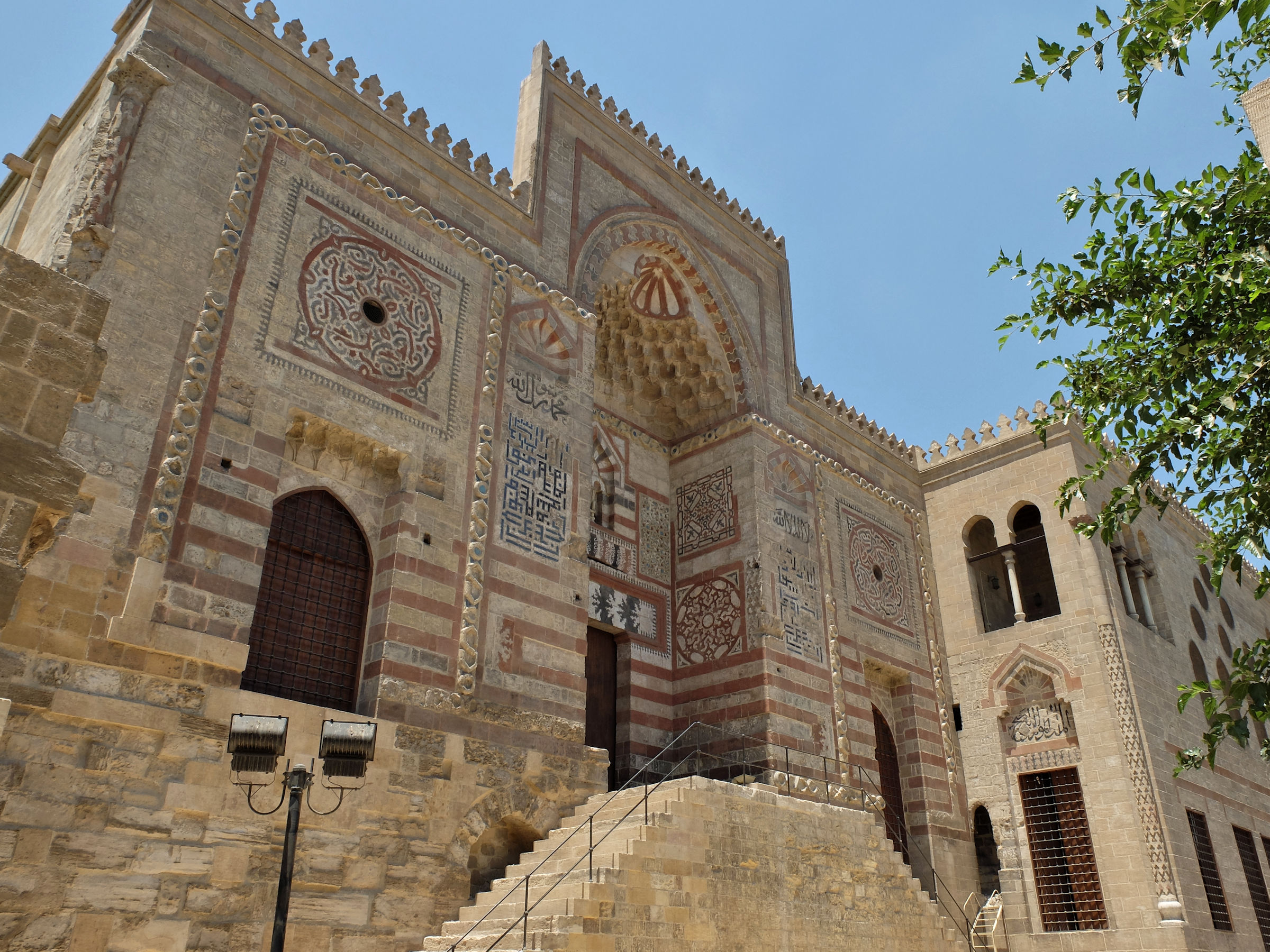
The Maristan of Sultan al-Mu'ayyad Shaykh, Cairo

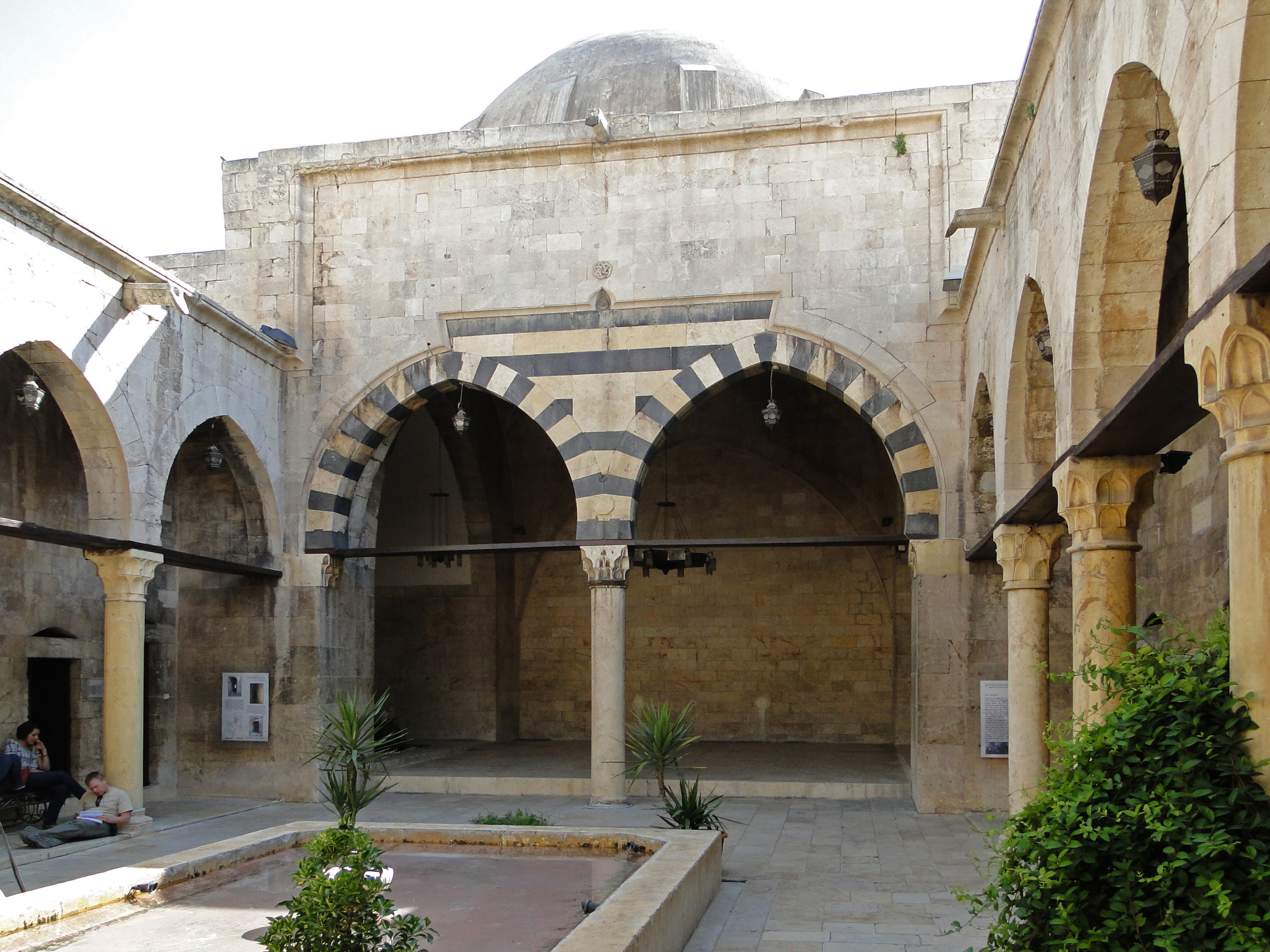
Courtyard of the Arghun al-Kamili Bimaristan in Aleppo, Syria

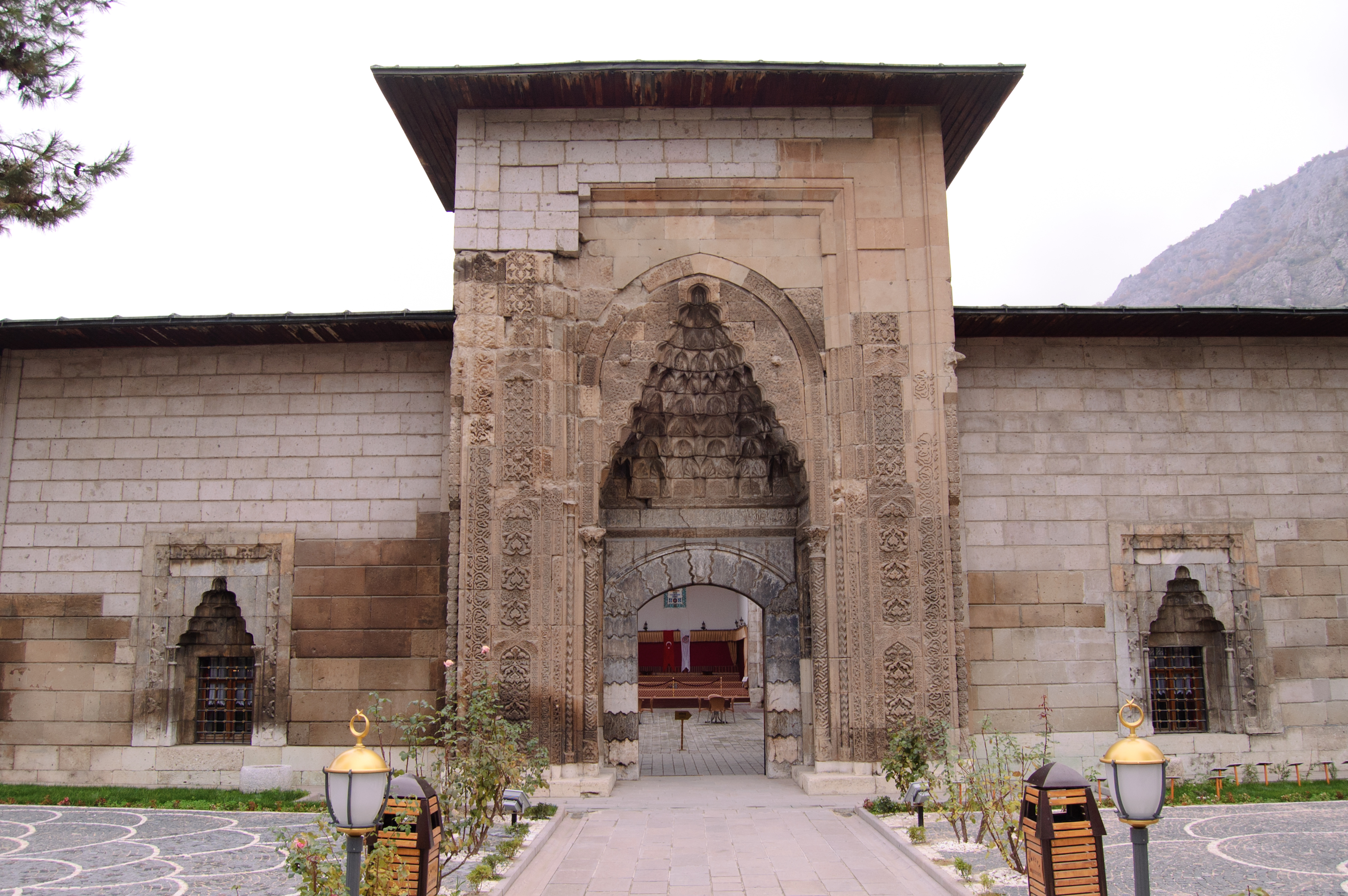
A bimaristan (the Darüşşifa or Bimarhane), Amasya, Turkey

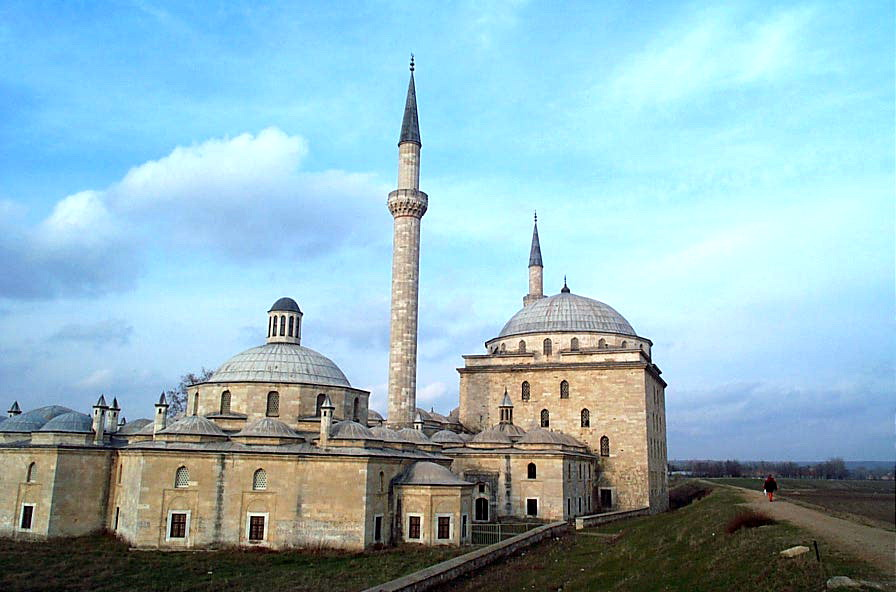
Exterior of the Sultan Bayezid II complex in Edirne, Turkey

== Advancements in medicine ==
With the development and existence of early Islamic hospitals came the need for new ways to treat patients. Bimaristans brought forth many groundbreaking medical advancements in Islamic culture during this time, which eventually spread to the entire world through trade and intellectual exchange. Distinguished physicians of this era pioneered revolutionary procedures and practices in surgeries, techniques, discoveries, and cures for ailments and the invention of countless medical instruments. Among the many developments stemming from Islamic hospitals were those designed to treat specific ailments, diseases, and anatomy.

=== Al-Mawsili and Ibn Isa ===
Ammar al-Mawsili, a 10th-century physician and ophthalmologist, developed a revolutionary treatment for cataracts. The practice included a hollow syringe (which he developed) and removing the cataract through suction. Although this procedure has further developed throughout the centuries, the basic treatment remains the same even today.

Diseases of the eye were further explored during this era by ʻAli ibn ʻIsa al-Kahhal or Ibn Isa (died c. 1038), who practiced and taught in the Al-Adudi Hospital in Baghdad. He wrote and developed the Tadhkirat al-kaḥḥālīn ("The Notebook of the Oculist"), which detailed more than 130 eye diseases based on anatomical location. The work was separated into three portions consisting of:

1. Anatomy of the eye
2. Causes, symptoms and treatments of diseases,
3. Less apparent diseases and their treatments.

This work was translated into Latin in 1497, and then into several other languages which allowed it to benefit the medical community for centuries to come.

=== Al-Zahrawi ===
Perhaps the largest contribution to Islamic surgical development came from Abū al-Qāsim Khalaf ibn al-'Abbās al-Zahrāwī, also known as Abū al-Qāsim or Al-Zahrawi (936–1013). He contributed to advancements in surgery by inventing and developing over 200 medical instruments which constituted the first independent work on surgery. Such instruments included tools like forceps, pincers, scalpels, catheters, cauteries, lancets, and specula, which were accompanied by detailed drawings of each tool. Al-Zahrawi also wrote the At-Taṣrīf limanʿajazʿan at-Taʾālīf, or At-Taṣrīf ("The Method"), which was a 30-part text based on earlier authorities, such as the Epitomae from the 7th-century Byzantine physician Paul of Aegina. It was largely composed of medical observations, including what is considered the earliest known description of hemophilia. The 30-volume encyclopedia also documented Zahrawi and his colleagues' experiences with treatment of the ill or afflicted. Aside from the documentation of surgical instruments, the work included operating techniques, pharmacological methods to prepare tablets and drugs to protect the heart, surgical procedures used in midwifery, cauterizing and healing wounds, and the treatment of headaches. Although Zahrawi was somewhat disregarded by hospitals and physicians in the eastern Caliphate (no doubt due to his Spanish roots, being near Córdoba, Spain), his advancement and documentation of medical tools and observations contained in his work had a vast influence on the eventual medical development in Christian Europe, when it was translated into Latin during the 12th century.

=== Al-Razi (Rhazes) ===
The Abbasid Caliphate in Baghdad underwent extreme intellectual and medical experimentation during the 10th and 11th centuries. Among the many skilled physicians and intellectuals there was Abū Bakr Muḥammad ibn Zakariyyāʾ al-Rāzī, or in Latin, Rhazes (c. 865–925). Rhazes served as chief physician in a hospital in Rayy, Iran, before holding a similar position in the Baghdad hospital. He developed two significant works regarding advancements in medicine and philosophy. The Kitāb al-Manṣūrī and the Kitāb al-ḥāwī, ("Comprehensive Book") which surveyed early Greek, Syrian, and Arabic medicine, and added his own judgement and commentary. He also wrote several minor treatises, perhaps the most famous being Treatise on Small Pox and Measles. This treatise was translated into several modern languages as well as Latin and Byzantine Greek for teaching purposes and medical treatment of such infectious diseases.

Abu-Bakr al-Razi was instrumental in improving the medical education within hospitals and was credited with the creation of 'ward rounds,' which served as a teaching method for the medical students within the hospital. The ward rounds consisted of several rounds of questions designated for students with different levels of medical expertise to answer. In the first round, students were expected to answer medical questions having to do with the current cases. The second round was designated for students with more experience to answer the remaining, more complex questions. Finally, if questions still remained after round two, al-Razi would provide answers and often document his findings. Abu-Bakr al-Razi has been credited with writing more than 200 books and treatises throughout his life.

=== Ibn Sina (Avicenna) ===
Although surgical developments and advancements made in the medieval Islamic period are of extreme importance, the greatest contribution to the medical world, which stemmed from Islamic medicine and hospitals, came from Ibn Sina, or "Avicenna" in the West, in the Baghdad firmament. Ibn Sina, who became a doctor by the age of 18, developed the Al-Qanun fi al-Tibb (Canon of Medicine), one of the most famous medical works of all time. The Canon of Medicine brought together disparate disciplines and cultures, reviving the thought of Greek authors and philosophers. Ibn Sina, for instance, combined the medical developments of Greek physician and philosopher Galen, with the philosophy of Aristotle. As Islamic medicine recognized that many diseases are contagious, such as leprosy, smallpox, and sexually transmitted diseases, Ibn Sina also recognized tuberculosis as a contagious disease, among others which can be spread through soil and water. The Canon of Medicine continued to be studied by European medical professionals and institutions into the 18th century.

Ibn Sina also served as a trailblazer for 'holistic medicine,' emphasizing the experience of the patient as a whole, rather than focusing on a single aspect when diagnosing. While Ibn Sina took the patient's medical symptoms into account, he also focused on the patient's nutrition, emotional health, and environment. Ibn Sina also had the belief that anatomy served as the cornerstone of medicine. Ibn Sina was the first known physician to use a flexible catheter with the purpose of irrigating the bladder and combatting urinary retention in the human body. Ibn Sina was groundbreaking in his recognition of esophageal cancer, ligation of bleeding arteries, the anatomy of nerves and tendons, compartment syndrome following injury to human appendages, and the idea that arterial repair would one day be possible.

=== Other Notable Scholars ===
- Hunayn ibn Ishaq, an Arab Nestorian Christian translator, scholar, physician, and scientist, was viewed as a mediator between Greek sciences and Arabs due to his translations of multiple documents that were tremendously important.
- Ibn al-Nafis, an Arab polymath whose areas of work included medicine, surgery, physiology, anatomy, biology, Islamic studies, jurisprudence, and philosophy was also a physician and an author, was most known for his commentary on pulmonary circulation.
- Mir Mu'min Husayni Tunikabuni, a 17th-century Persian scholar, focused on how yogic breath control can control the humors.

== Legacy and aftermath ==
While people used to learn medicine by traveling, working in their homes, in madrasas, or in hospitals, people learned that bimaristans were one of the most helpful institutions for people to learn in. They had all the resources and teachers available at all times, which made it a very convenient place to learn and teach in. Bimaristans paved the way for many medical institutions.

Much of the legacy surrounding the Islamic influence on modern hospitals and science can be found in the discoveries, techniques, and practices introduced by scholars and physicians working in these hospitals between the tenth and nineteenth century. This time period was extremely important to the advancement of modern medicinal practices, and is known as one of the greatest periods of development. Many of these discoveries laid the foundation for medical development in Europe, and are still common practice in modern medicine. Among these discoveries in astronomy, chemistry, and metallurgy, scholars developed techniques for medicine such as the distillation and use of alcohol as an antiseptic, which is still being used in hospitals today. Not only did these discoveries lead to lasting improvements in medicine in the Muslim world, but through the influence of early Islamic and Arabian hospitals, medical institutions around the world were introduced to various new concepts and structures, increasing the efficiency and cleanliness which can still be found in modern-day institutions.

Some of these influential concepts include the implementation of separate wards based on disease and gender, pharmacies, housing of medical records, and the education associated with practicing medicine. Prior to the Islamic era, most European medical care was offered by priests in sanatoriums and annexes to temples. Islamic hospitals revolutionized this by being operated secularly and through a government entity, rather than being solely operated by the church. This introduction of government-operated hospitals led to not having any discrimination against people for any reason, allowing the hospital to solely focus on their main goal of serving all people and working together to help everyone out.

Bimaristans were some of the first known hospitals to have been built and truly served a purpose to the people around them. They became established centers for patient care, a main source of medical education for students, and a form of practical training for all doctors and physicians that were working within the bimaristans. They documented how the centers ran: how medical records were kept safe, how doctors and physicians became properly licensed, and how upkeep was maintained so that the hospitals could continue to serve the patients that needed many different forms of help. Later hospitals were modelled from the original bimaristans, which shows that they were well-run centers that served a great purpose to the people in surrounding areas. Western hospitals may not be what they are today without the history of early medical practices in bimaristans

=== Separate wards ===
Islamic hospitals also brought about the idea of separate wards or segments of the hospital that were separated by patient diagnostic. When Islamic hospitals first brought this about, not only were the wards separated by diagnostic but by sex as well. While hospitals today are not as strict and do not separate by sex anymore, they still separate people by disease or problem. By doing so, different wings could specialize in certain treatments specific to their patient. This practice not only still exists today in modern hospitals but also lead to the advancement of treatments back then that now comprise The Canon of Medicine. This separation of diseases not only helped the timely treatment of patients but also helped the patients and physicians from getting sick with other diseases that surrounded them because they only had to worry about the prevention of one disease. By separating patients, the specialization of certain wings and treatments really advanced the medicine and improved the efficiency of hospitals ultimately leading to how modern day hospitals are designed.

=== Medical records ===
With medicine in Islamic hospitals advancing so quickly, there was a need to catalogue subsequent findings, which led to the creation of the first medical records. This made hospitals more efficient as they were able to check records of previous patients for those that had similar symptoms and, hopefully, treat them effectively through established methods. Not only did physicians keep medical records, but they kept notes on patients as well and provided them for peer review as a way to hold one another accountable against medical malpractice. This information also enabled physicians to notice patterns in patient symptoms, making medicinal practices more accurate through compiled evidence. The efficiency gained from keeping records allowed hospitals to run more smoothly and treat patients faster. This collection of medical records ultimately lead to the accumulation of The Canon of Medicine, a book of medicine compiled by the Persian philosopher Avicenna (Ibn Sina) that was completed in 1025.

=== Education and qualification ===
Another legacy that vastly changed the way through which medical practices were developed, was the method of education and perpetuation of medical knowledge. Islamic hospitals modernized the qualification of physicians and education leading to a license to practice medicine in hospitals. In 931 CE, Caliph Al-Muqtadir started the movement of licensing physicians by telling Siban Ibn Thabit to only give physician licenses to qualified people. The origin of Caliph Al-Muqtadir's order to Siban Ibn-Thabit was due to the fact that a patient had previously died in Baghdad as a consequence of a physician's error. Siban Ibn-Thabit was tasked with examining each of the 860 practicing physicians at the time, resulting in the failure of 160 and setting a new precedent within the medical world. From this point on, physicians were required to pass licensing examinations prior to being able to practice medicine. In an effort to properly enforce licensing examination, the position of muhtasib was established. The muhtasib was a government official who administered oral and practical licensing examinations to young physicians. If the young physician was successful in proving his professional competence through the examinations, the muhtasib would administer the Hippocratic Oath and a license allowing the physician to legally practice medicine.

Seeing as how one of the chief objectives of Islamic hospitals was the training of new physicians or students, senior physicians, and other medical officers would often hold instructive seminars in large lecture halls detailing diseases, cures, treatments, and techniques from class manuscripts. Islamic hospitals were also the first to adopt practices involving medical students, accompanied by experienced physicians, into the wards for rounds to participate in patient care. Hospitals doubling as schools not only provided hospitals with more fresh working hands but also helped in the advancement of medicine. Education in hospitals during the Islamic period deeply influenced modern medical training in which medical students are the most junior members of the clinical team while still participating in direct patient care. In most modern training models, after graduating medical school with a medical degree, whether it be an MBBS, MD, or DO, these physicians-in-training then go on to complete a residency during which they are practicing physicians but remain under the supervision of experienced and generally board-certified senior physicians . This came at a time when much of Europe's medical practices were much less advanced, and with the compilation and creation of Avicenna's (Ibn Sina) medical textbook, The Canon of Medicine, these groundbreaking Islamic discoveries were able to influence Europe and the rest of the world for centuries to come.

=== Pharmacology ===
During the Islamic Golden Age, the Graeco-Arabic translation movement aimed to provide classical texts in Arabic. Some of the books that impacted the field were Tarkib-Al-Advieh, about mixtures of drugs, Kitāb fī al-adwiya al-mufrada by Ibn al-Jazzar, which was written about single drugs; Ghova-Al-Aghzieh, which concerned the potency of food for medicine; al-Adwiyah Ao Al-dava, Al-Oram which concerned swellings of the body; and Kitāb al-Diryāq "The Book of Theriac". Through readings, Islamic doctors were able to find drugs that they could use to help treat patients.

One of the most notable contributors to pharmacology was Galen, a physician in the Roman Empire who wrote on theories of drug action. Galen's theories were later recorded, simplified, and translated by Arabic scholars, notably Hunayn ibn Ishaq. Much documentation regarding naming drugs is available because the works were translated. Authors such as al-Zahrawi and Maimonides went into detail on this aspect and discussed the naming of drugs, including the linguistics, as well as the synonyms and explanations behind the name given to the drug. Avicenna also contributed to the naming and categorizing of narcotics. In his Cannon of Medicine, he explained medicine types such as antiseptics and drugs and the forms such as tablets, powders, and syrups.

After learning from the different books, Arabic physicians made numerous contributions when determining patient dosage depending on their condition. Multiple scholars, including the Arabic scholar and physician al-Kindi, determined the geometric progression of dosage. They found an arithmetic increase in the drug's sensation as the dosage was increased.

Some of the main areas of study regarding pharmacology involved toxicology and the science behind sedative and analgesic drugs. Many physicians, Arabic and not alike, were fascinated with poisons. They sought out knowledge on how to make them and remediate them. Similarly, the science of sedative and analgesic drugs also fascinated Arabic physicians. Substances such as Cannabis sativa (hashish), Hyoscyamus Niger (Black henbane, a narcotic), and Papaver somniferum (opium) were well-studied and used in their medicine.

== See also ==
- Academy of Gondishapur
- Medicine in the medieval Islamic world
