= Esau (disambiguation) =

Esau is the older son of Isaac in the Hebrew Bible.

Esau may also refer to:

- Cyclone Esau, Category 4 South Pacific and Australian region cyclone in 1992
- Esau (film), 2019 drama film
- Esau (name), Hebrew given name and surname

== Species ==
- Arixenia esau, species of earwig
- Eocarterus esau, species of ground beetle
- Eurysops esau, species of beetle
- Mirapinna esau, species of fish
