= Maristan of Granada =

Former medieval Islamic hospital in Granada, Spain

Coordinates: 37°10′43.4″N 3°35′34.3″W

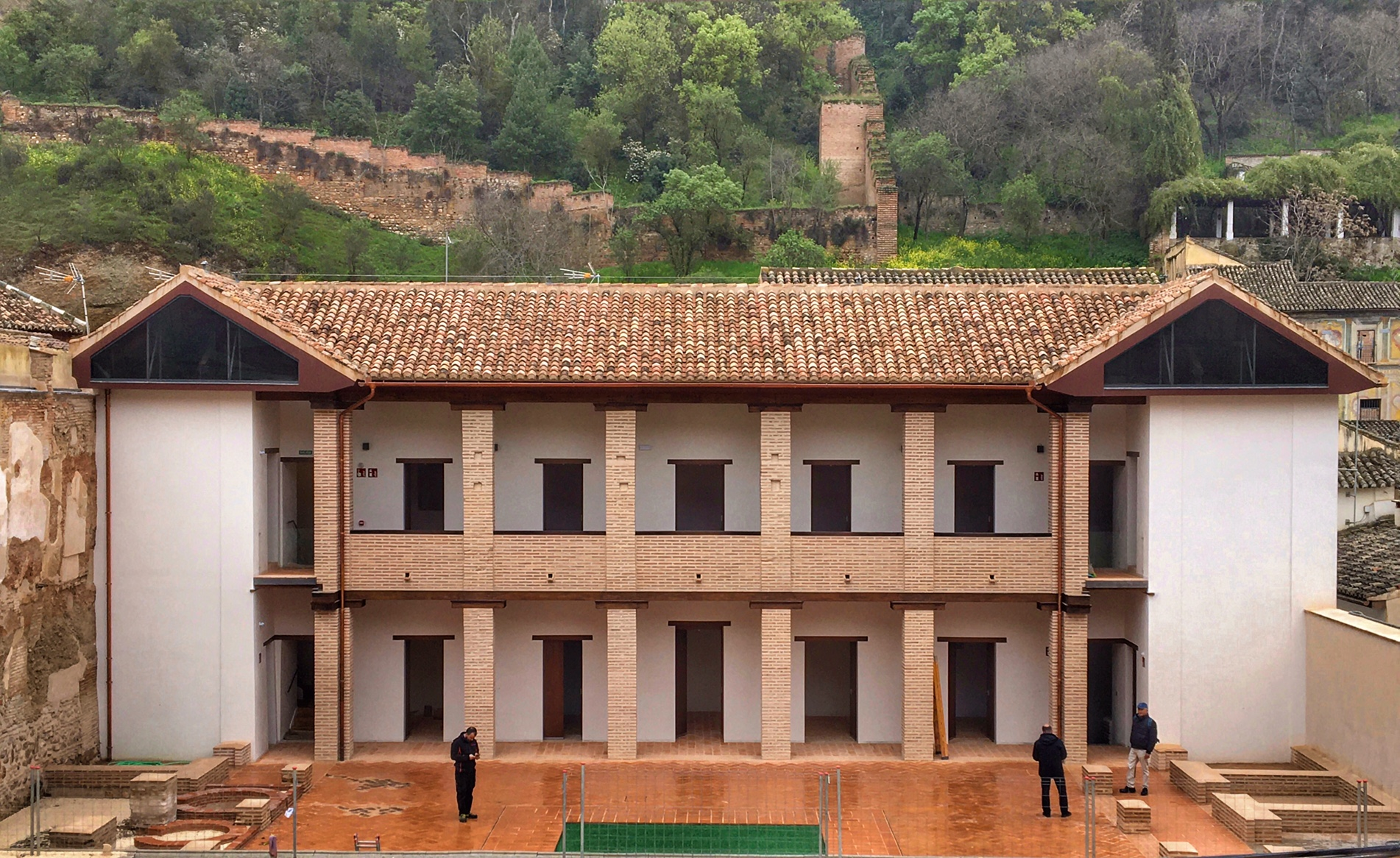
The remains of the maristan in 2022, after a recent partial restoration

The Maristan of Granada (Spanish: Maristán de Granada) was a bimaristan (hospital) in Granada, Spain. It was built in the 14th century during the Nasrid period and demolished in the 19th century.

== History ==
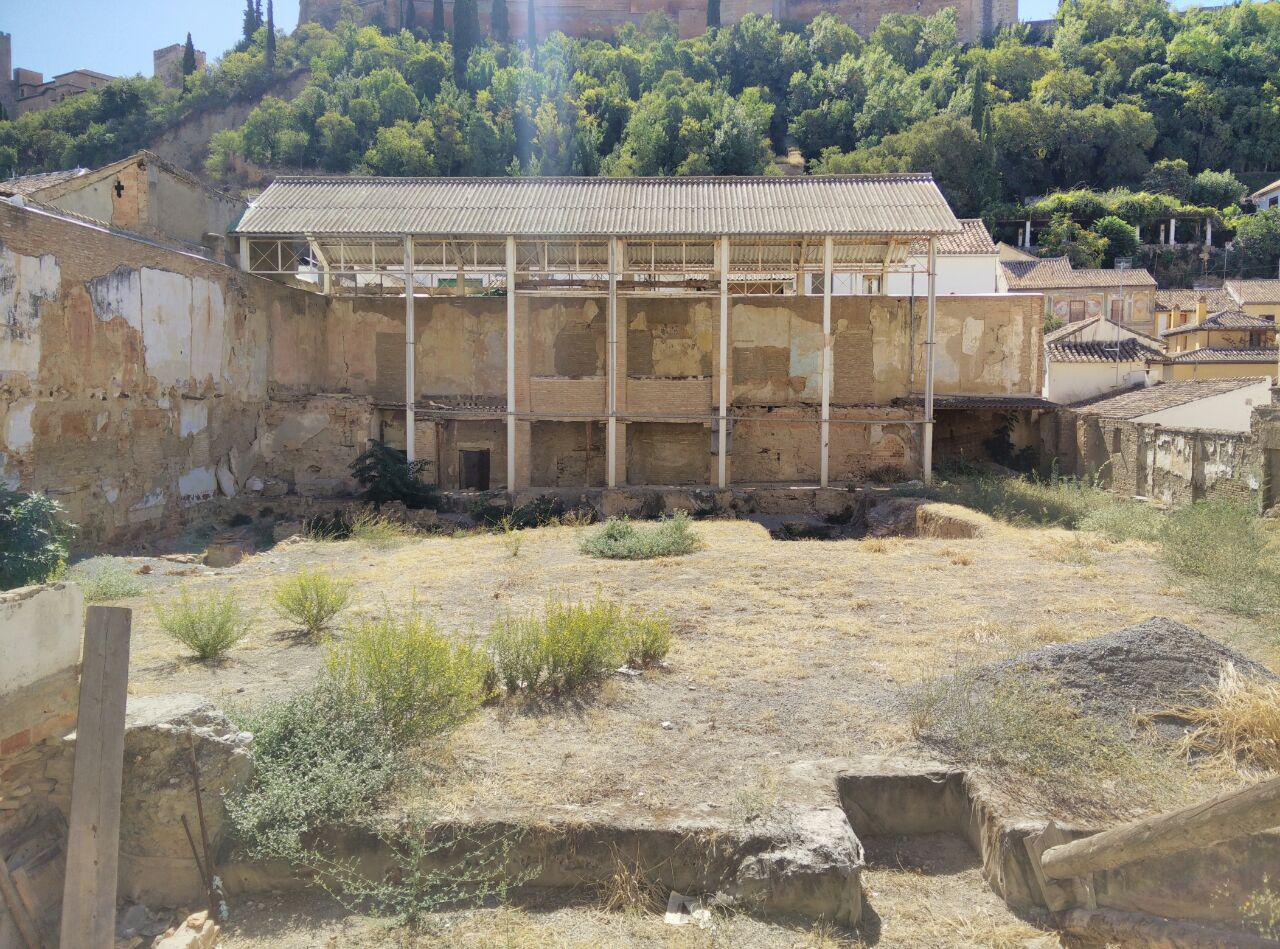
Ruins of the Maristan in 2015

Maristans or bimaristans were the historic equivalent of hospitals in the Islamic world, first originating further east and spreading to Algeria, Morocco and Al-Andalus around the 12th to 14th centuries. The Maristan of Granada may have been inspired or influenced by similar institutions founded by the Marinids in Morocco (e.g. the 13th-century Maristan of Sidi Frej). It was founded by the Nasrid sultan Muhammad V in 1365, with construction finishing in 1367. It was located in the lower Albaicín quarter, on the north bank of the Darro River near the 11th-century bathhouse known as the Hammam al-Yawza (today known as El Bañuelo).

Like other maristans in the region, the Maristan of Granada was especially notable for treating mental illness, though its original medical focus may have been more general and it only slowly became specialized as an asylum for the mentally ill. It was one of the earliest hospitals in Europe that took care of the mentally ill, with comparable institutions in Christian Spain only appearing in the early 15th century with the foundation of the Hospital of Our Lady Mary of the Innocents in Valencia, the first purely psychiatric hospital in Europe. After the end of Muslim rule in Granada and Spain in 1492, the building was converted to other uses. In 1502, it became a mint (Casa de la Moneda). It was later given to Mercedarian friars until the 18th century, when it was turned into a winery. Finally, it served as a tenement before being abandoned.

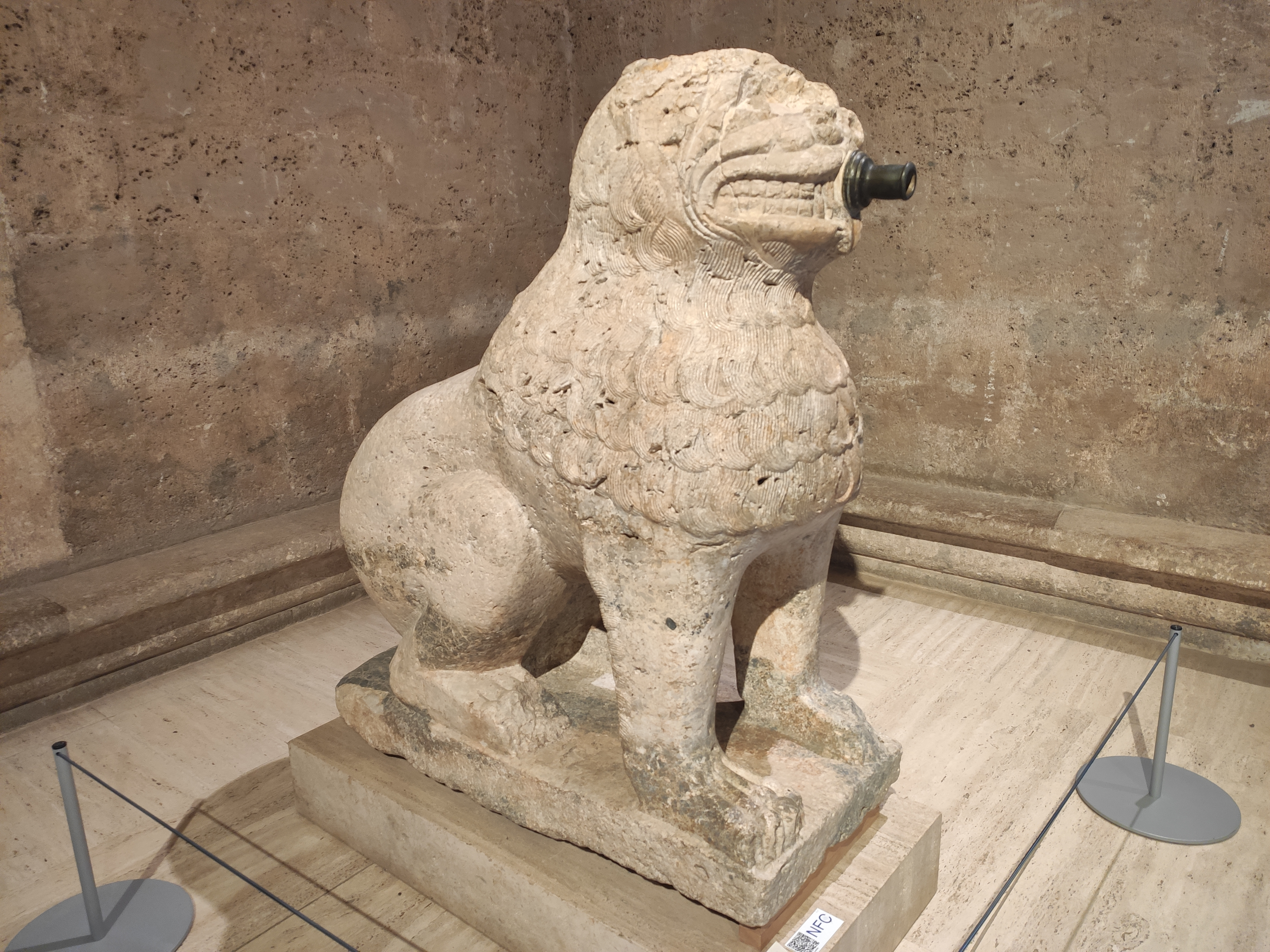
One of the Maristan's stone lion fountains, now on display at the Alhambra Museum

By the 19th century the building was in ruins. It was eventually demolished almost entirely in 1843, with further demolitions taking place in 1984. After the demolition, the maristan's stone lion fountains were moved to the Partal Palace at the nearby Alhambra, where they remained for decades until they were restored and moved again to the Alhambra Museum, where they are now on display along with the maristan's foundation inscription.

== Architecture ==
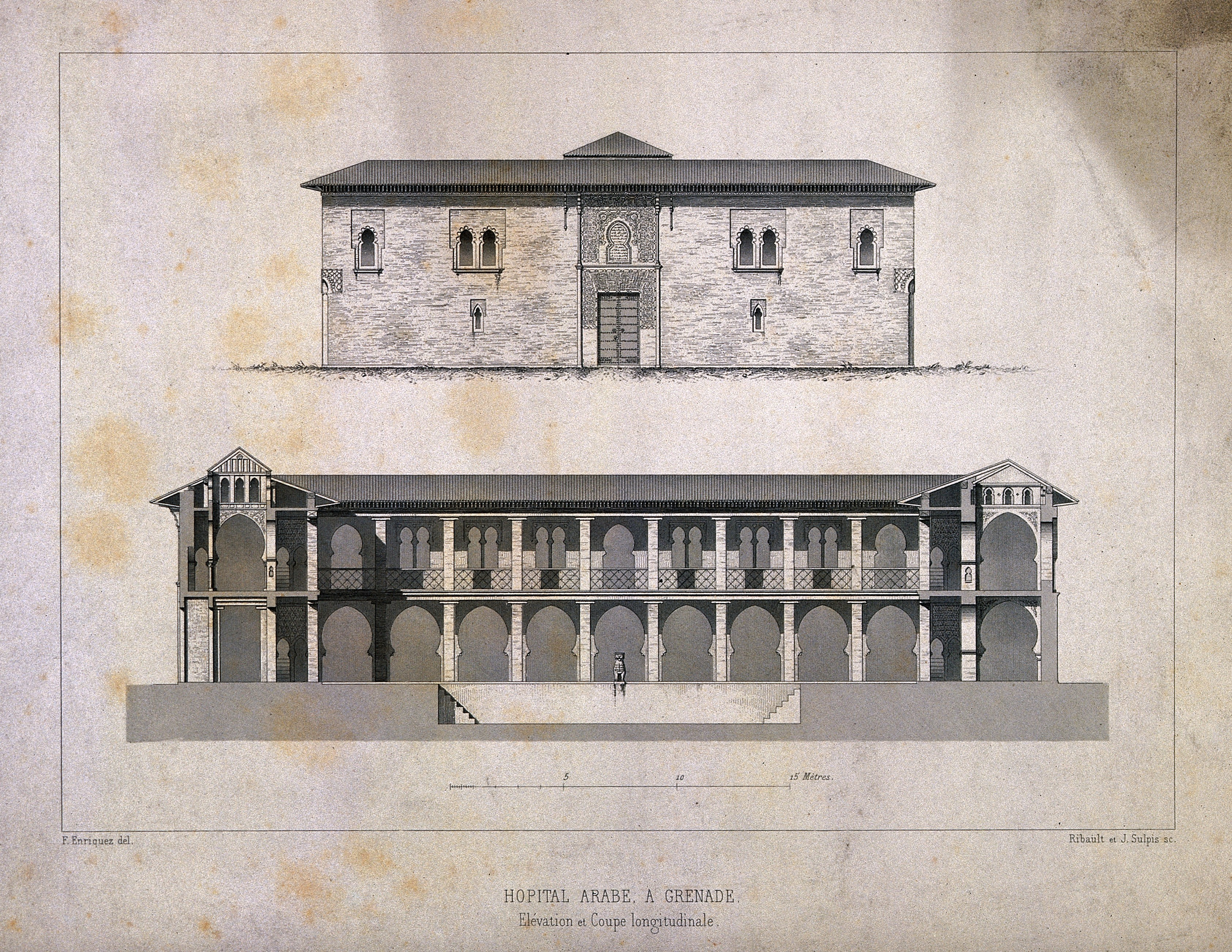
19th-century drawings of the façade and the cross-section of the Maristan

The layout and shape of the building is known thanks to 19th-century plans and drawings made by Francisco Enríquez Ferrer and Jules Gailhabaud, as well as thanks to modern archeological investigations. Many of its elements had similarities to the Nasrid-era caravanserai known today as the Corral del Carbón.

The structure had a rectangular floor plan measuring 38 by 26.5 meters and was built out of brick and covered with plaster. It consisted of a central courtyard with four long rectangular halls situated along the sides, which were in turn divided in many small rooms and four square halls at the corners with stairs leading to a second level with similar arrangement. The courtyard measured 26 by 15 meters and was surrounded by a portico or gallery. At the center of the courtyard was a long rectangular pool with two lion-shaped stone fountains standing on its longer sides. While central pools were a regular feature of Moorish architecture at this time, the presence of stairs descending into the pool suggests it may have been used for therapeutic bathing. Judging by fragments excavated on site, the interior of the building was once decorated with tilework, carved stucco, and marble. The stone lions, now kept at the Alhambra Museum, are made of dark coloured marble and represent a stylized rather than realistic image of lions.

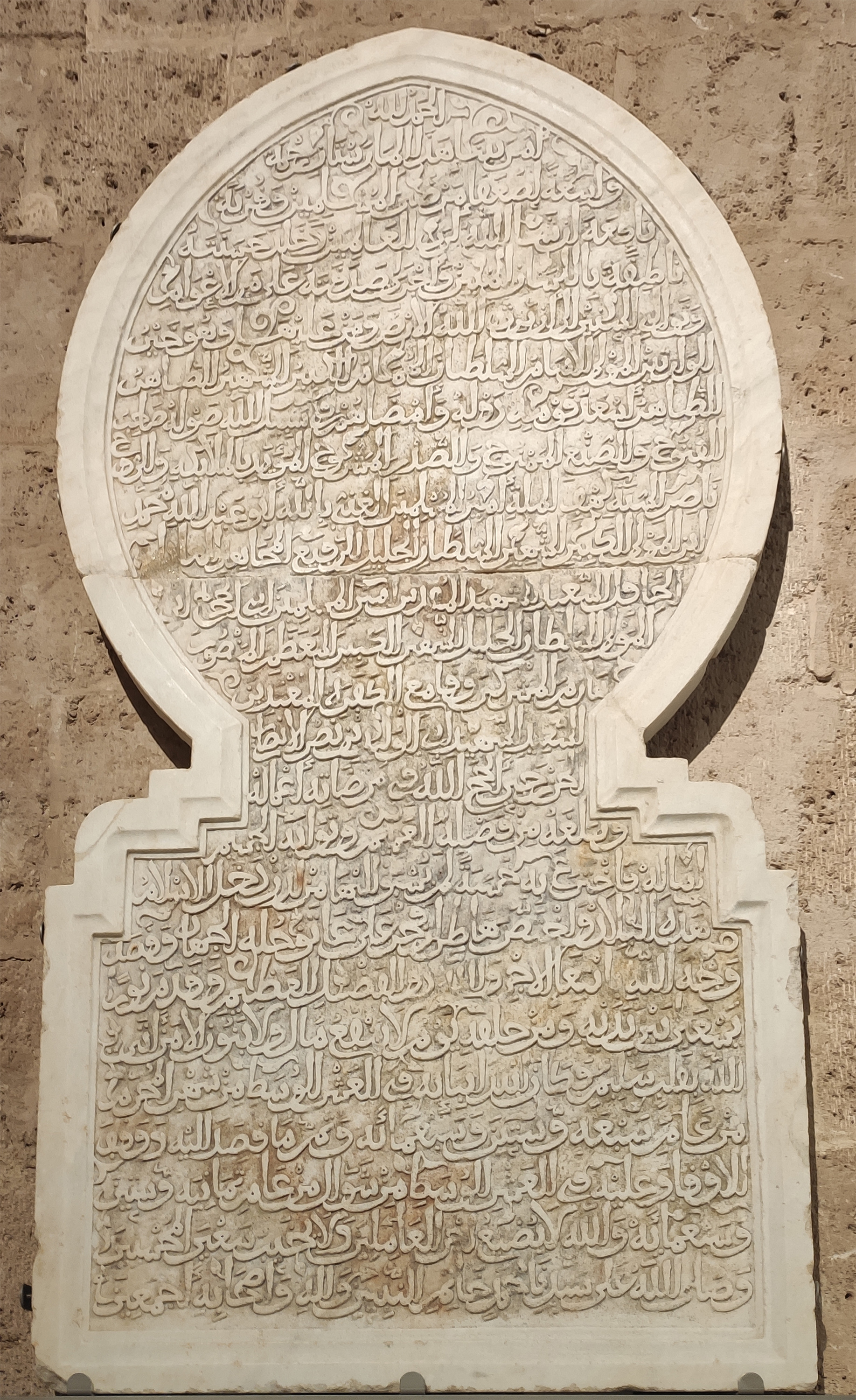
The original foundation inscription of the Maristan, now on display at the Alhambra Museum

The building's exterior had a symmetrical façade with a richly decorated entrance portal. Above the wooden double doors was a decorative ensemble, starting at the bottom with a lintel covered in geometric ornamentation carved in brick, above which was a pointed horseshoe arch-shaped niche which was in turn framed by a polylobed arch motif and surrounded by arabesque vegetal motifs. The arched niche was filled with the building's long foundation inscription carved in stone with Arabic letters painted gold on a turquoise background. This inscription stone panel is also kept at the Alhambra Museum today.

== Present-day restoration ==
After decades of abandonment, a major project to restore the maristan's remains was begun in 2020, though it was initially delayed by the COVID-19 pandemic that year. The project is funded in part by an investment of 1.3 million euros from the European Regional Development Fund. The first phase of work involved consolidating and restoring the maristan's southern gallery, the only part of the original building that survived demolition. This first phase was completed in 2022 and since January 2023 the site is now open to visitors and tourists. As of March 2023, a second phase of the project was being planned, aiming to restore the rest of the site and add a more accessible entrance.

Several discoveries were made during excavations in the early phases of work. Among them, an 11th-century well, pre-dating the Nasrid maristan, was discovered under the courtyard. From the post-Nasrid period, smelting furnaces and a cooling pond belonging to the 16th-century mint were also recovered and have been integrated into the restored site for visitors to see.

== See also ==
- Madrasa of Granada
