= Ophthalmology in the medieval Islamic world =

Ocular healthcare

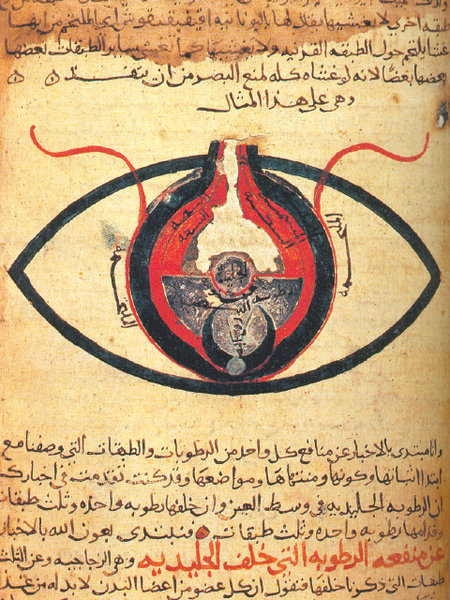
An Arabic manuscript, dated 1200 CE, titled Anatomy of the Eye, authored by al-Mutadibih

Ophthalmology was one of the foremost branches in medieval Islamic medicine. The oculist or kahhal (کحال), a somewhat despised professional in Galen's time, was an honored member of the medical profession by the Abbasid period, occupying a unique place in royal households. Medieval Islamic scientists (unlike their classical predecessors) considered it normal to combine theory and practice, including the crafting of precise instruments, and therefore found it natural to combine the study of the eye with the practical application of that knowledge. The specialized instruments used in their operations ran into scores. Innovations such as the "injection syringe", a hollow needle, invented by Ammar ibn Ali of Mosul, which was used for the extraction by suction of soft cataracts, were quite common.

Muslim physicians described such conditions as pannus, glaucoma (described as "headache of the pupil"), phlyctenulae, and operations on the conjunctiva. They were the first to use the words "retina" and "cataract".

== Education and history ==
To become a practitioner, there was no one fixed method or path of training. Nevertheless, it was standard and necessary to learn and understand the works and legacy of predecessors. Among those one can mention, The alteration of the eye by Yuhanna ibn Masawayh, whose work can be considered the earliest work on Ophthalmology, followed by Hunain ibn Ishaq, known in the west as Johannitius, for his work The ten treatises of the eye. One of Hunain ibn Ishaq's innovations was to describe the crystalline lens as being located in the exact center of the eye.

=== Cataract extraction ===
The next major landmark text on ophthalmology was the Choice of Eye Diseases written in Egypt by the Iraqi Ammar ibn Ali al-Mawsili who attempted the earliest extraction of cataracts using suction. He invented a hollow metallic syringe, which he applied through the sclerotic and successfully extracted the cataracts through suction. He wrote the following on his invention:

Then I constructed the hollow needle, but I did not operate with it on anybody at all, before I came to Tiberias. There came a man for an operation who told me: Do as you like with me, only I cannot lie on my back. Then I operated on him with the hollow needle and extracted the cataract; and he saw immediately and did not need to lie, but slept as he liked. Only I bandaged his eye for seven days. With this needle nobody preceded me. I have done many operations with it in Egypt.

=== Other contributions ===
Avicenna, in The Canon of Medicine (c. 1025), described sight as one of the five external senses. The Latin word "retina" is derived from Avicenna's Arabic term for the organ.

In his Colliget, Averroes (1126–1198) was the first to attribute photoreceptor properties to the retina, and he was also the first to suggest that the principal organ of sight might be the arachnoid membrane (aranea). His work led to much discussion in 16th century Europe over whether the principal organ of sight is the traditional Galenic crystalline humour or the Averroist aranea, which in turn led to the discovery that the retina is the principal organ of sight.

Ibn al-Nafis wrote a large textbook on ophthalmology called The Polished Book on Experimental Ophthalmology. The book is divided into two sections: "On the Theory of Ophthalmology" and "Simple and Compunded Ophthalmic Drugs". Other significant works in medieval Islamic ophthalmology include Rhazes' Continens, Ali ibn Isa al-Kahhal's Notebook of the Oculists, and Jabril ibn Bukhtishu's Medicine of the Eye.

== Ottoman Empire ==
In the Ottoman Empire, and well into the Republic of Turkey of the 20th century, a class of ambulatory eye surgeons, popularly known as the "kırlangıç oğlanları" ("sons of the swallow") operated on cataract using special knives. From contemporary sources can be glimpsed that the reputation of these "blinding frauds" was far from spotless.

== See also ==
- Islamic medicine
- Islamic science
- Islamic Golden Age
- List of Arab scientists and scholars
- List of Iranian scientists and scholars
