= Eocarterus baeticus =

Scientific classification
- Kingdom: Animalia
- Phylum: Arthropoda
- Class: Insecta
- Order: Coleoptera
- Suborder: Adephaga
- Family: Carabidae
- Genus: Eocarterus
- Species: E. baeticus

Binomial name
- Eocarterus baeticus Rambur, 1837

Species of beetle

Eocarterus baeticus is a species of ground beetle in the genus Eocarterus. It belongs to the subgenus Baeticum.
