= Eocarterus tazekensis =

Scientific classification
- Kingdom: Animalia
- Phylum: Arthropoda
- Class: Insecta
- Order: Coleoptera
- Suborder: Adephaga
- Family: Carabidae
- Genus: Eocarterus
- Species: E. tazekensis

Binomial name
- Eocarterus tazekensis Antoine, 1959

Species of beetle

Eocarterus tazekensis is a species of tiger beetle in the genus Eocarterus and subgenus Eocarterus.
