= Esau (name) =

Esau is the name given to the older son of Isaac in the Hebrew Bible.

== People ==
=== Given name ===
Esau עֵשָׂו
- Pronunciation: Hebrew: [/ˈiːsɔː/]
- Gender: Male
- Language: Hebrew

Origin
- Meaning: hairy or rough

Other names
- Variant forms: ʿĒsáv (Modern Hebrew) ʿĒśāw (Tiberian); Hesau (Latin); Ἠσαῦ (Ēsaû, Greek) عِيسَوْ (‘Īsaw, Arabic)
- See also: Essau, Esaú, Esava, Isa

- Esau (judge royal) (fl. 1197–1198), Hungarian noble
- Esau, Palatine of Hungary (fl. 1197–1198), Hungarian noble
- Esau Adenji (born 1944), Cameroonian long-distance runner
- Esau Chulu (born 1974), Zambian judge
- Esau de' Buondelmonti (died 1411), despot
- Esaú Flores (born 1997), Honduran footballer
- Essau Kanyenda (born 1982), Malawian footballer
- Esau Khamati Oriedo (1888–1992), Kenyan Christian evangelist, philanthropist and entrepreneur
- Esau Jenkins (1910–1972), American activist
- Esau Mann (born 1971), Tongan rugby league footballer
- Esau Mwamwaya, member of The Very Best
- Esau McCaulley (born 1979), American biblical scholar
- Esau Owusu Dahnsaw (born 1984), Liberian actor and model
- Esava Ratugolea (born 1998), Australian rules footballer
- Esau Schafer (born 1952), Canadian politician
- Esau Simpson (born 1990), Grenadian swimmer
- Esau Thoms (1926–1979), political leader in Newfoundland and Labrador
- Esau Tjiuoro (born 1982), Namibian footballer

=== Surname ===
- Abraham Esau (1884–1955), German physicist
- Bernhardt Esau (born 1957), Namibian politician
- Charlotte Esau (born 1961), American politician
- Gilbert Esau (1919–2012), American politician
- Katherine Esau (1898–1997), German-American botanist
- Keith Esau (born 1960), American politician
- Len Esau (born 1968), Canadian ice hockey player
- Lizzie Esau (born 1999), English musician
- Logona Esau (born 1987), Tuvaluan weightlifter
- Ron Esau (1954–2022), American racecar driver
- Shahid Esau, South African politician
