= Eocarterus propagator =

Scientific classification
- Kingdom: Animalia
- Phylum: Arthropoda
- Class: Insecta
- Order: Coleoptera
- Suborder: Adephaga
- Family: Carabidae
- Genus: Eocarterus
- Species: E. propagator

Binomial name
- Eocarterus propagator (Reitter, 1901)

Species of beetle

Eocarterus propagator is a species of ground beetle in the genus Eocarterus.
