= Ammar al-Mawsili =

Inventor, doctor and surgeon

Abu al-Qasim Ammar ibn Ali al-Mawsili (Arabic: عمار الموصلي) was an important eleventh-century Arab Muslim ophthalmologist. Despite little being known about his life or education, he has been described as the most original of all Arab oculists.

As his nisba indicates, Ammar was born in Mosul, and later moved to Egypt, where he settled during the reign of the Fatimid caliph al-Hakim bi-Amr Allah, to whom he wrote his only composition, Kitāb al-muntakhab fī ilm al-ayn (“The book of choice in ophthalmology”).

He is mostly known for the invention of a hypodermic syringe, which he used to remove cataracts, a major cause of blindness.

Regarding his invention he wrote the following:

Then I constructed the hollow needle, but I did not operate with it on anybody at all, before I came to Tiberias. There came a man for an operation who told me: Do as you like with me, only I cannot lie on my back. Then I operated on him with the hollow needle and extracted the cataract; and he saw immediately and did not need to lie, but slept as he liked. Only I bandaged his eye for seven days. With this needle nobody preceded me. I have done many operations with it in Egypt.

He was a contemporary of the famous oculist Ali ibn Isa.

== See also ==
- Ophthalmology in medieval Islam
