= Eocarterus amicorum =

Scientific classification
- Kingdom: Animalia
- Phylum: Arthropoda
- Class: Insecta
- Order: Coleoptera
- Suborder: Adephaga
- Family: Carabidae
- Genus: Eocarterus
- Species: E. amicorum

Binomial name
- Eocarterus amicorum Wrasse, 1993

Species of beetle

Eocarterus amicorum is a species of ground beetle in the genus Eocarterus. It belongs to the subgenus Baeticum. E. amicorum has a very limited geographical range, being present in only Spain.
