= Eocarterus =

Scientific classification
- Domain: Eukaryota
- Kingdom: Animalia
- Phylum: Arthropoda
- Class: Insecta
- Order: Coleoptera
- Suborder: Adephaga
- Family: Carabidae
- Subfamily: Harpalinae
- Genus: Eocarterus; Stichel, 1923

Subgenera
- Baeticocarus; Eocarterus

Genus of beetles

Eocarterus is a genus of beetles in the family Carabidae. It contains eight species divided into two subgenera, Eocarterus and Baeticocarus.

== Species ==
=== Subgenus Baeticocarus ===
This subgenus contains the following species:

- Eocarterus amicorum Wrase, 1993
- Eocarterus baeticus Rambur, 1837

=== Subgenus Eocarterus ===
This subgenus contains the following species:

- Eocarterus chodshenticus Ballion, 1871
- Eocarterus esau Heyden, 1885
- Eocarterus propagator Reitter, 1901
- Eocarterus semenowi (Reitter, 1893)
- Eocarterus tazekensis Antoine, 1959
- Eocarterus usgentensis Heyden, 1884
