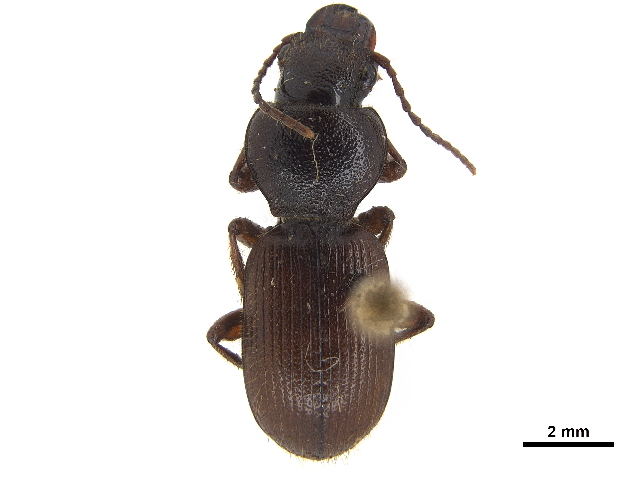

Scientific classification
- Kingdom: Animalia
- Phylum: Arthropoda
- Class: Insecta
- Order: Coleoptera
- Suborder: Adephaga
- Family: Carabidae
- Genus: Eocarterus
- Species: E. chodshenticus

Binomial name
- Eocarterus chodshenticus Baillon, 1871

= Eocarterus chodshenticus =

Species of beetle

Eocarterus chodshenticus is a species of ground beetle in the genus Eocarterus. It is common in the Zarafshan Range of Uzbekistan, wherein populations of the beetle increase with increasing altitude.
