= Palace of Charles V =

Renaissance building in Granada, Spain

Coordinates: 37°10′37″N 3°35′22″W

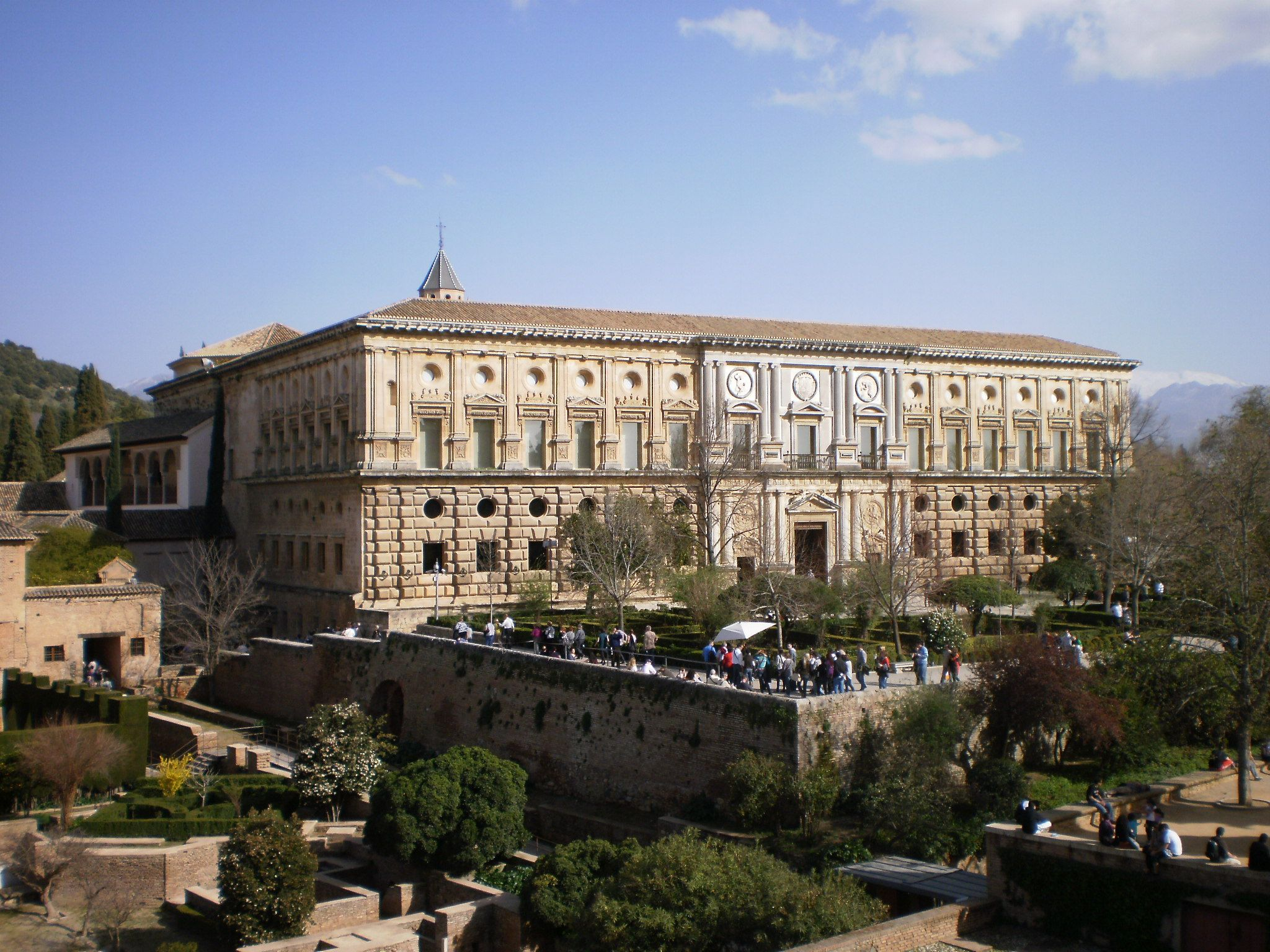
The palace, seen from the west

The Palace of Charles V is a Renaissance building in Granada, southern Spain, inside the Alhambra, a former Nasrid palace complex on top of the Sabika hill. Construction began in 1527 but dragged on and was left unfinished after 1637. The palace was only completed after 1923, when Leopoldo Torres Balbás initiated its restoration. The building has never been a home to a monarch and stood roofless until 1967. Today, the building also houses the Alhambra Museum on its ground floor and the Fine Arts Museum of Granada on its upper floor.

== History ==
The palace commissioned by Charles V in the middle of the Alhambra was designed by Pedro Machuca, an architect who had trained under Michelangelo in Rome and who was steeped in the culture of the Italian High Renaissance and of the artistic circles of Raphael and Giulio Romano. It was conceived in a contemporary Renaissance style or "Roman" style with an innovative design reflecting the architectural ideals of this period. The architecture espoused by Charles V in Spain at this time was also influenced by, among other traditions, the Plateresque style. The construction of a monumental Italian or Roman-influenced palace in the heart of the Nasrid-built Alhambra symbolized Charles V's imperial status and the triumph of Christianity over Islam achieved by his grandparents (the Catholic Monarchs).

Construction of the palace began in 1527. After Machuca's death in 1550 it was continued by his son Luis, who finished the façades and built the internal courtyard. Work was halted for 15 years when the 1568 Morisco Rebellion began. Work was still unfinished when Philip IV visited in 1628 and the project was finally abandoned in 1637, leaving the structure without a roof. As a result, the palace deteriorated in the following centuries, during which it was used as a storage facility for gunpowder and other materials. During the Peninsular War, when French troops occupied the Alhambra between 1810 and 1812, the French soldiers stripped any wooden furnishings they could find inside the palace in order to make fires.

The palace was only completed after 1923, when Leopoldo Torres Balbás initiated its restoration. The roof of the building was finally completed in 1967. A small "Arab museum" was first installed in the building in 1928. In 1942 it became the Archeological Museum of the Alhambra and in 1995 it became the current "Alhambra Museum", housed on the ground floor. In 1958 another museum, the Fine Arts Museum of Granada, was installed on the upper floor.

== Architecture ==
The plan of the palace is a 17-metre (56 ft) high, 63-metre (207 ft) square containing an inner circular patio. This has no precedent in Renaissance architecture, and places the building in the avant-garde of its time. The palace has two floors (not counting mezzanine floors). The classical orders are in pilaster form except around the central doorways. On the exterior, the lower floor is in the Tuscan order, with the pilasters "blocked" by continuing the heavy rustication across them, while the upper storey uses the Ionic order, with elaborately pedimented lower windows below round windows. Both main façades emphasize the portals, made of stone from the Sierra Elvira.

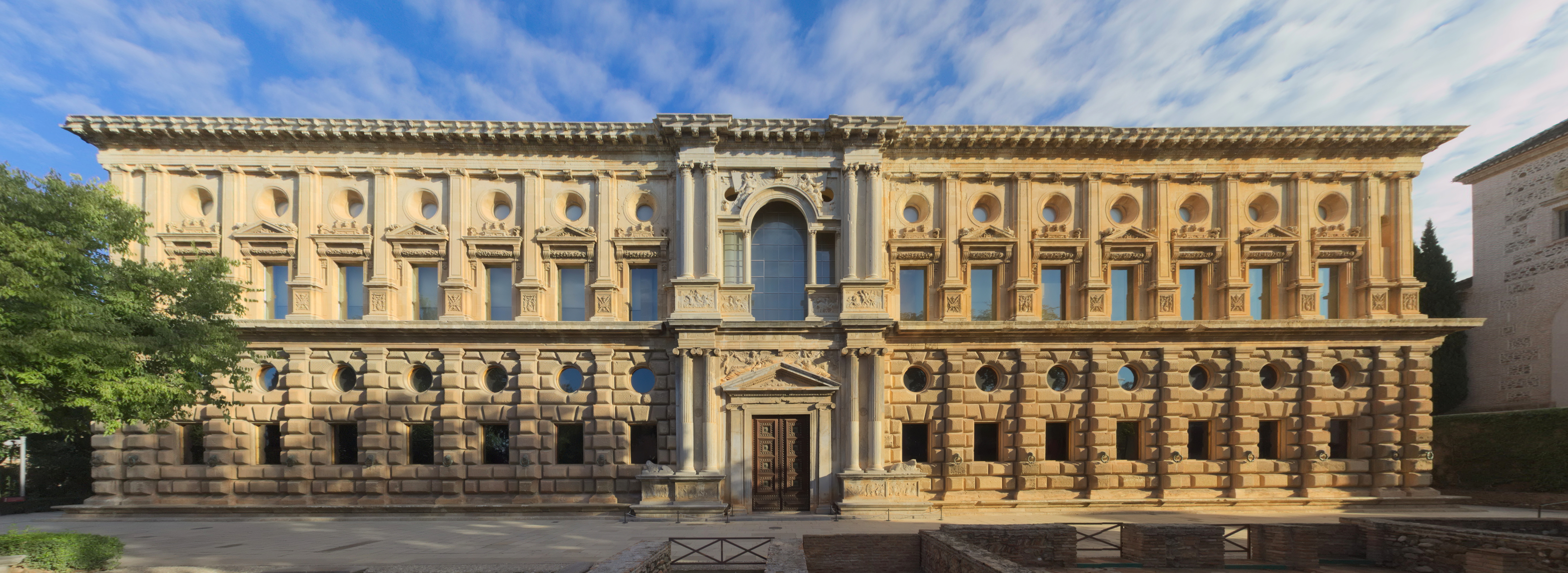
Southern facade of the Palace of Charles V

The circular patio has also two levels. The lower consists of a Doric colonnade of conglomerate stone, with an orthodox classical entablature formed of triglyphs and metopes. The upper floor is formed by a stylized Ionic colonnade whose entablature has no decoration. This organisation of the patio shows a deep knowledge of Roman architecture, and would be framed in pure Renaissance style but for its curved shape, which surprises the visitor entering from the main façades. The interior spaces and the staircases are also governed by the combination of square and circle. Similar aesthetic devices would be developed in the following decades under the classification of Mannerism.

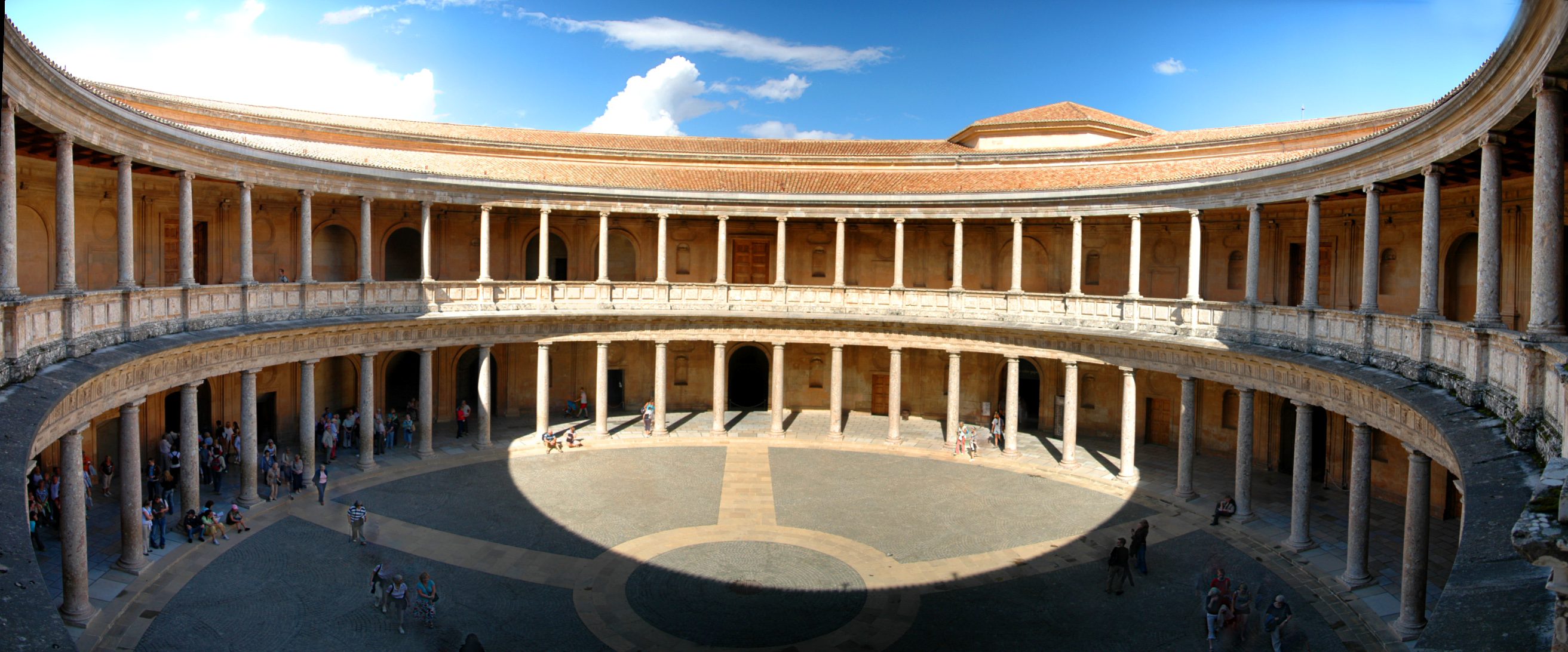
Patio of the Palace of Charles V

== Museums ==
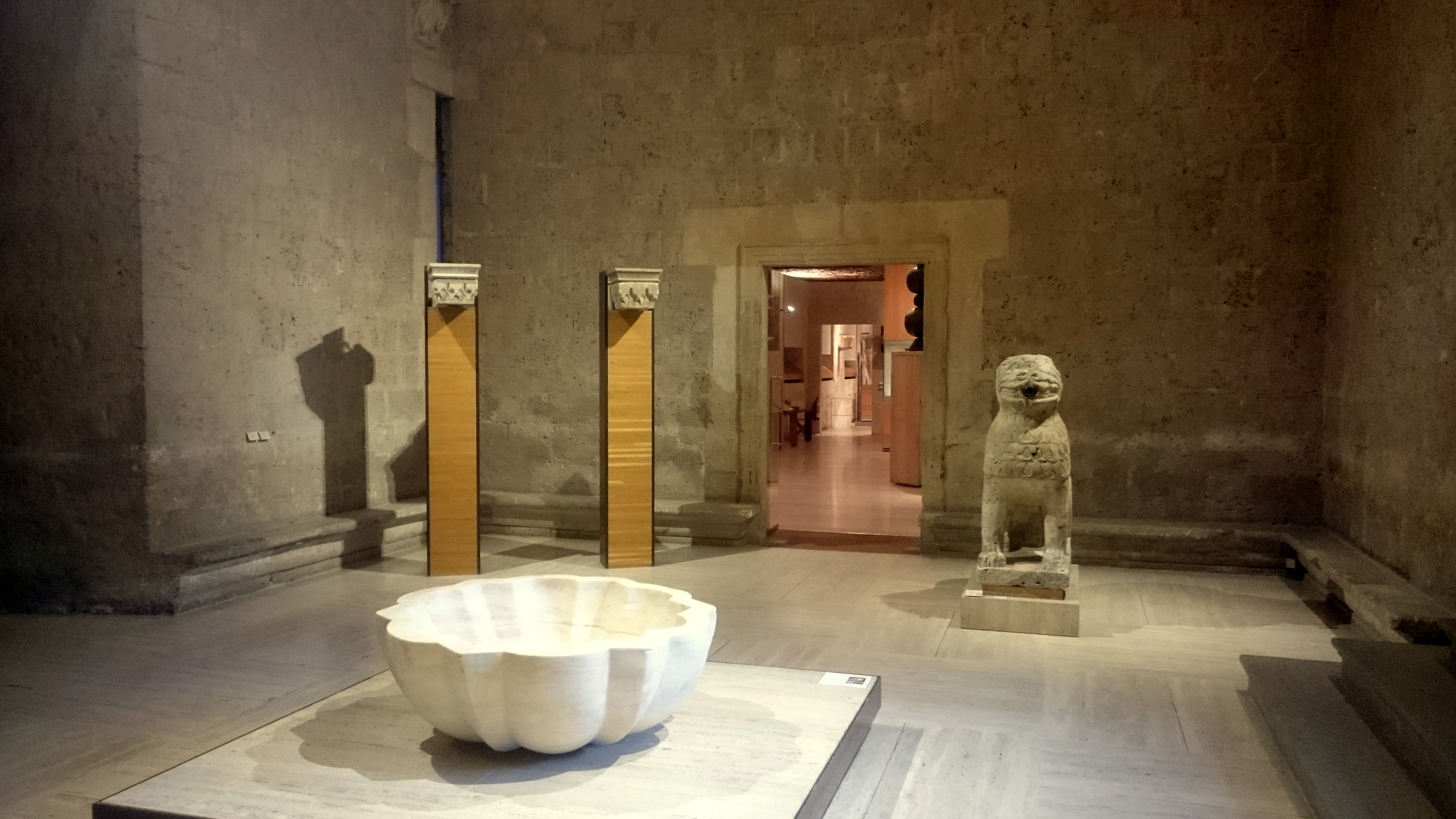
A gallery of the Alhambra Museum; showing marble pieces from the Nasrid period, including a lion sculpture from the Maristan (right)

=== Alhambra Museum ===
The first predecessor of this museum was a small "Arab museum" installed in Palace of Charles V in 1928, although a similar museum had existed in Granada since 1870. In 1942 its successor, the Archeological Museum of the Alhambra was installed here. Finally, in 1994–1995 it became the current Alhambra Museum, laid out in its present location on the ground floor of the palace. The museum houses numerous artifacts and art objects originating in the Alhambra, ranging from the early Islamic period of Granada up to the Nasrid period, in addition to some other Islamic art objects from other locations. The objects on display include 10th-century marble pieces from Madinat al-Zahra and other sites of the Caliphate era, fragments and panels of original decoration from the Nasrid palaces (including some of the lost palaces such as the Alijares Palace), Nasrid marble fountains and sculptures (such as a marble lion from the Maristan), and various other Nasrid-era furnishings. Among the highlights is the Vase of the Gazelles, one of the so-called "Alhambra vases", a huge and richly decorated ceramic vase from the 14th century.

=== Fine Arts Museum of Granada ===
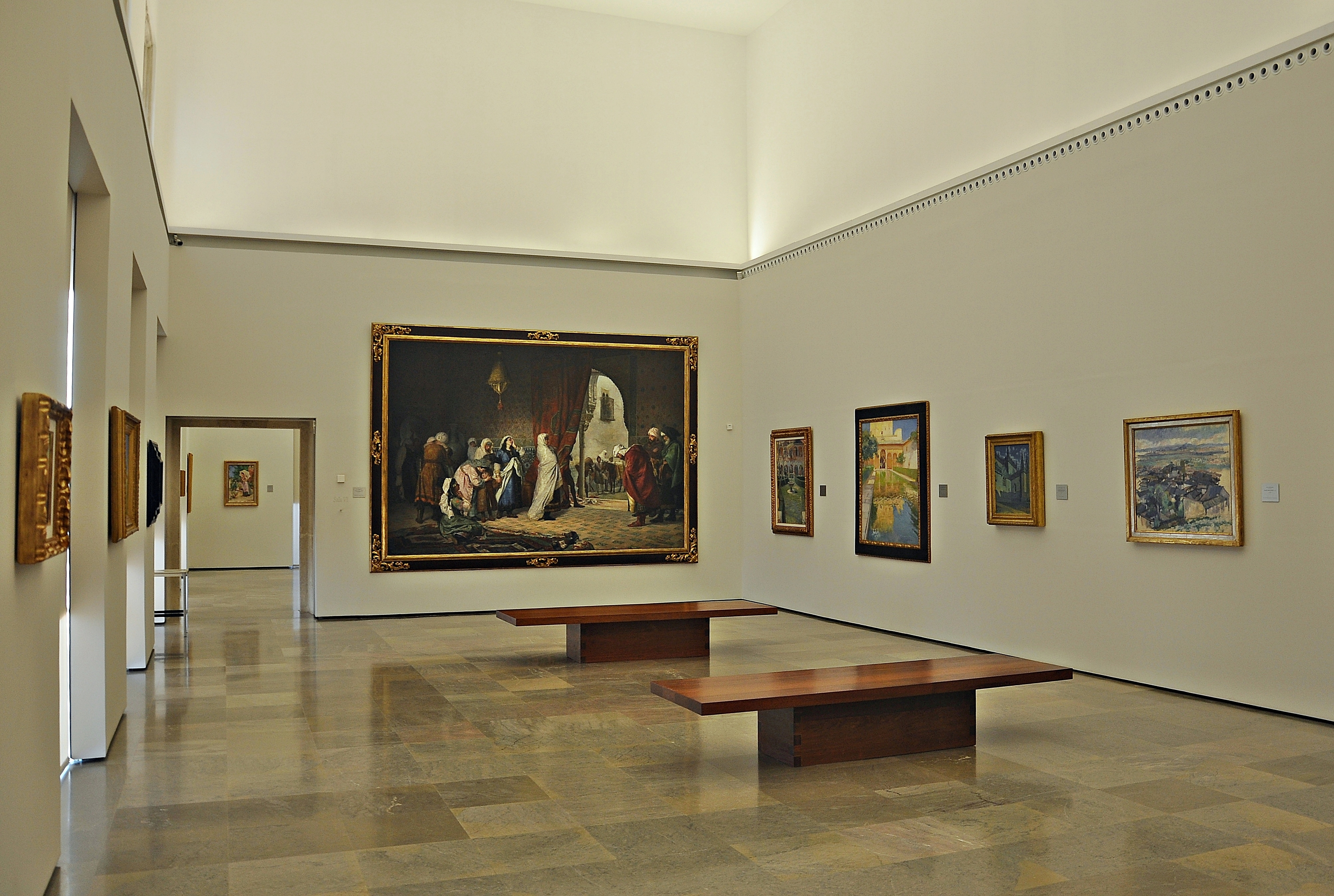
A gallery inside the Fine Arts Museum of Granada

The Fine Arts Museum was moved here in 1958 and is housed on the palace's upper floor today. It displays a collection of paintings and sculptures from Granada dating from the 16th to 20th centuries. The bulk of the collection is drawn from the properties of the Catholic church, such as the Cartuja in Granada and other monasteries and convents. Among the highlights are The Burial of Christ by Jacopo Torni, Thistle Still-Life by Juan Sánchez Cotán, a Limoges enamel piece, and paintings by 20th-century artist Manuel Angeles Ortiz.
