= Eocarterus usgentensis =

Scientific classification
- Kingdom: Animalia
- Phylum: Arthropoda
- Class: Insecta
- Order: Coleoptera
- Suborder: Adephaga
- Family: Carabidae
- Genus: Eocarterus
- Species: E. usgentensis

Binomial name
- Eocarterus usgentensis Heyden, 1884

Species of beetle

Eocarterus usgentensis is a species of tiger beetle in the genus Eocarterus and subgenus Eocarterus.
