= Eocarterus esau =

Scientific classification
- Kingdom: Animalia
- Phylum: Arthropoda
- Class: Insecta
- Order: Coleoptera
- Suborder: Adephaga
- Family: Carabidae
- Genus: Eocarterus
- Species: E. esau

Binomial name
- Eocarterus esau Heyden, 1885

Species of beetle

Eocarterus esau is a species of ground beetle in the genus Eocarterus. It was discovered by the zoologist Heyden in 1885.
