= İsa Kaykun =

Turkish footballer

Personal information
- Date of birth: 5 June 1988 (age 38)
- Place of birth: Istanbul, Turkey
- Height: 1.90 m (6 ft 3 in)
- Position: Centre-back

Youth career
- –2007: Waldhof Mannheim

Senior career*
Years	Team	Apps	(Gls)
2007–2010	FC Heidelsheim		
2010–2012	Kasımpaşa	5	(1)
2011	→ Güngörenspor (loan)	16	(3)
2012	→ Eyüpspor (loan)	17	(3)
2012–2014	Güngörenspor	32	(1)
2014–2019	1. FC Bruchsal	151	(26)
- * Club domestic league appearances and goals as of 20:40, 28 February 2023 (UTC)

İsa Kaykun (born 5 June 1988) is a Turkish professional footballer who currently plays as a centre-back.

Kaykun began his career in Germany, playing for clubs such as SV Waldhof Mannheim and FC Heidelsheim. Kaykun moved to Kasımpaşa on 1 February 2010, signing a contract until May 2014.
