= Esau Tjiuoro =

Namibian footballer

Esau Tjiuoro (born 26 May 1982 in Okakarara) is a Namibian former football goalkeeper with F.C. Civics Windhoek and the Namibia national football team.

== Career ==
Tjiuoro has played in the Namibia Premier League since 2000. Prior to joining Civics, he played with Ramblers F.C.
