= Maristan of Sidi Frej =

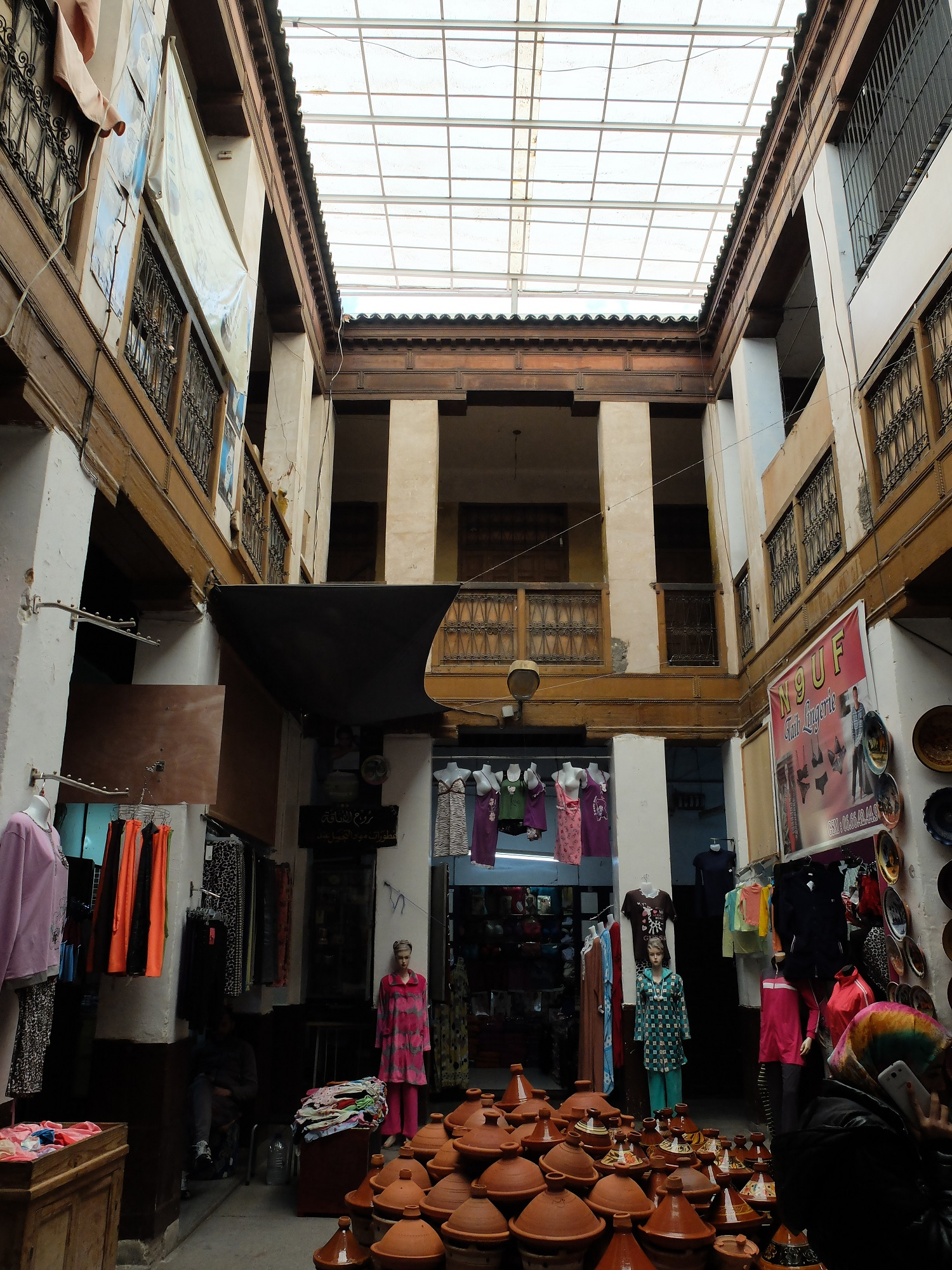
- The present-day funduq building on the site of the former Maristan of Sidi Frej

Geography
- Location: Fez, Morocco
- Coordinates: 34°03′54.5″N 4°58′30″W

Organisation
- Type: Maristan
- Religious affiliation: Muslim

History
- Opened: 13th century
- Closed: 1944
- Demolished: 1944

Links
- Lists: Hospitals in Morocco

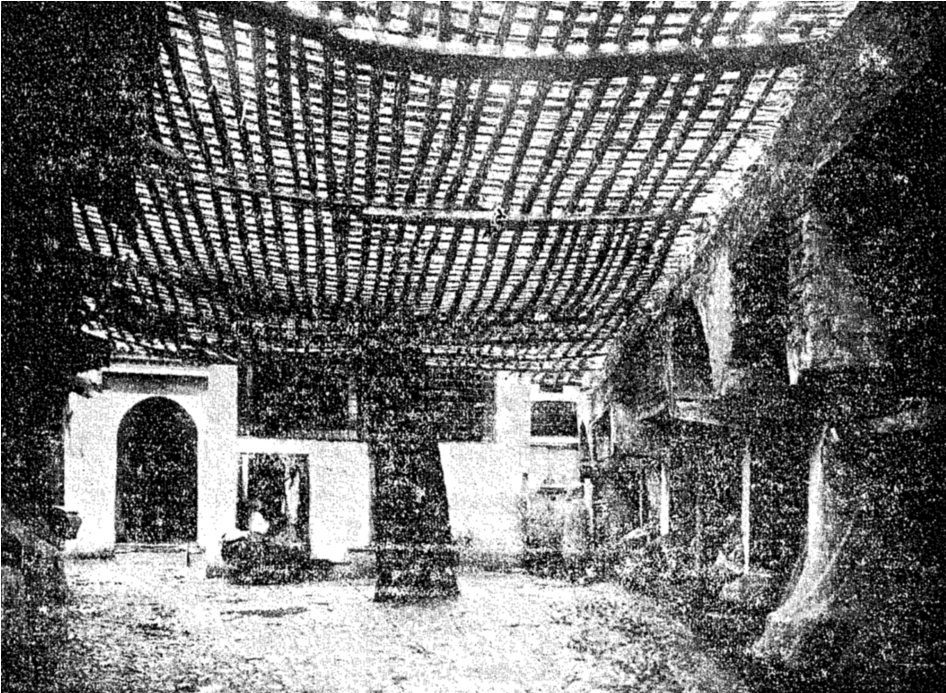
Maristan of Sidi Frej before its destruction in 1944

The Maristan of Sidi Frej or Maristan of Fez was a historic maristan in Fez, Morocco. It was founded by the Marinids in the 13th century and functioned as a hospital and as a hospice for the destitute and mentally ill up until the 20th century. It was one of the most famous and important maristans in Morocco and may have influenced similar institutions in the region at the time.

== Location ==
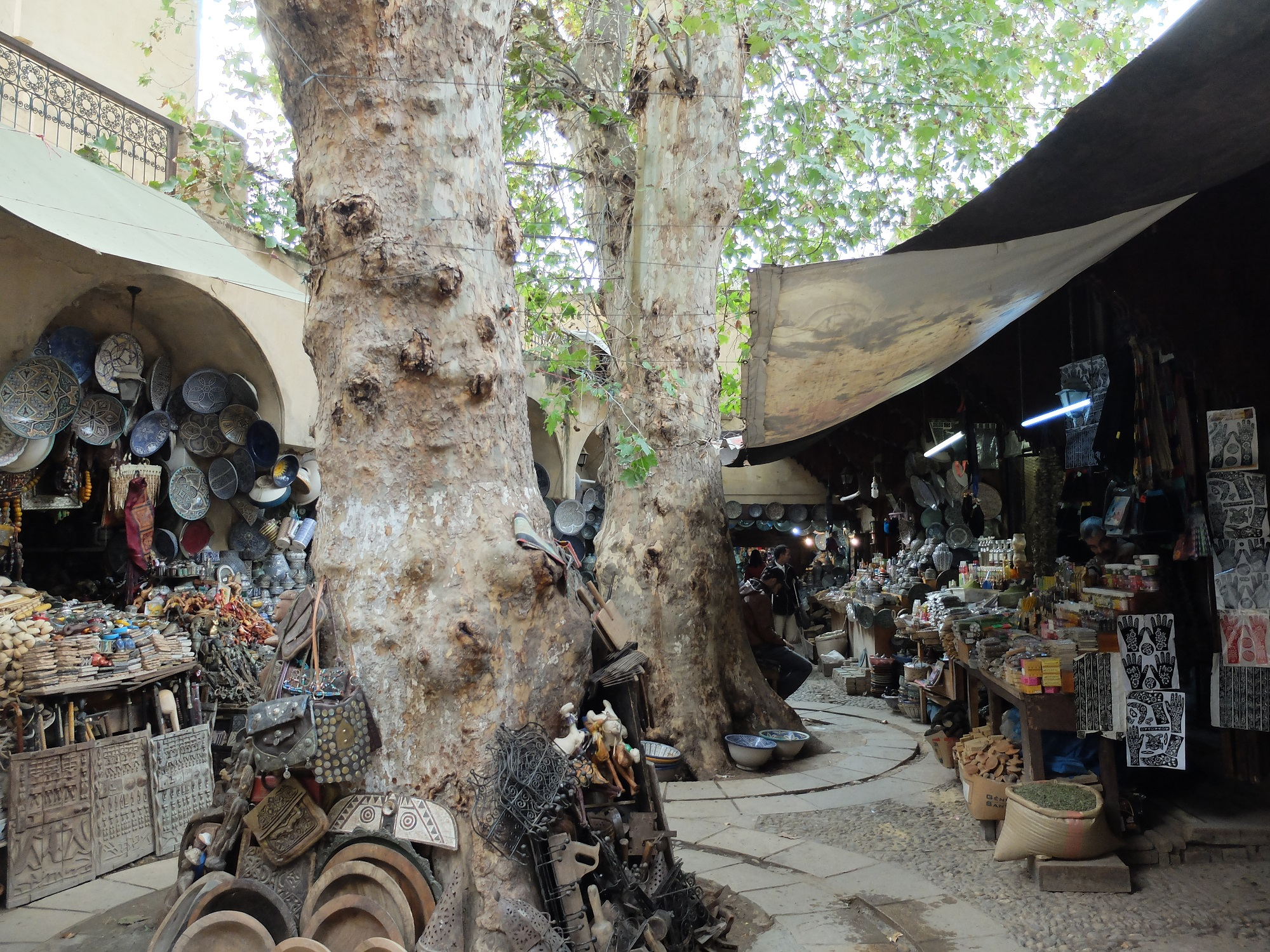
The Souq el-Henna, a small market square on the west side of the former maristan.

The site of the maristan today is occupied by a funduq (caravanserai-type building) which houses various shops. This building is located between Tala'a Kebira street and the Zawiya of Moulay Idris II. It opens onto a small public square on its west side, distinguished by the trees at its center, which was historically designated as the Souq el-Henna or henna market.

== History ==
=== Foundation and function ===
The first maristan in Morocco was established in Marrakesh under the Almohad dynasty in the 12th century, where Ibn Rushd (Averroes) worked for a time. The maristan in Fes was founded by the Marinid sultan Abu Ya'qub Yusuf (ruled 1286–1307) in the late 13th century. Its operations were funded and maintained by religious endowments known as a habous or waqf. The institution may have influenced the foundation and function of similar establishments elsewhere in Morocco and Spain, including a hospital for the mentally ill founded in Valencia in 1410. It originally functioned as a full hospital dealing with different domains of medicine, reflecting the relatively advanced state of medicine in the Muslim world at the time. In maristans across the Islamic world, mental illness was treated with music, aromas, water and other methods designed to soothe them. The Maristan of Sidi Frej became the most famous and important institution of its kind in Fes, and was visited by major scholars of medicine of the time such as Abu Bakr al-Korachi, an Andalusian from Malaga. This maristan also had the curious function of operating as a stork hospital, nursing sick or injured cranes and storks, and burying those that died. This charity towards animals was made possible by the donations and bequeathments of various individuals over the years.

In addition to its services for the sick and needy, the building and its location anchored other civil services in historic Fes. The town criers, who also ran an office for lost and found objects, were headquartered here. The official office and tribunal of the mohtasib, a magistrate in charge of public order, was also located here (or at least this was the case by the beginning of the 20th century).

=== Decline and end ===
Leo Africanus worked as the administrative secretary ('adl) of the maristan for 2 years in the late 15th century. He remarked in his writings that the services at the hospital had already declined by then, with patients often being merely confined to their rooms, restrained, and sometimes abused. According to him, the decline in services was due to successive sultans diverting and appropriating the maristan's charitable endowments (habous) for their own ends. As a result, for most of its later history the maristan appears to have served mainly as a hospice providing shelter and food for the city's destitute, mentally ill, and other individuals excluded from society. By the 19th century, this decline was also evident in maristans across other regions of the Islamic world and was subsequently exacerbated by their alienation under colonial rule. One original practice of the Sidi Frej hospital which continued up until the 20th century, however, were the weekly concerts of Andalusian music intended to serve as musical therapy.

The maristan continued to operate in this capacity up until 1944, when it was destroyed by a fire. In 1951, the French colonial authorities reopened a new maristan in a different location intended to serve as successor to the Maristan of Sidi Frej and designed to function according to modern Western psychiatric theories. Its inauguration may have also been in part motivated by attempts to make colonial rule, coming under heavy opposition, appear more respectful of local Muslim traditions and institutions. Meanwhile, the site of the original maristan was adapted or rebuilt as a funduq-type building with traditional architecture that now houses various shops. It continues to act as a shopping center currently, although as of 2018 there were proposals to restore it and convert it back to a center offering medical services.

== Fountain of Sidi Frej ==
Near the Maristan and the Henna Souk is a public street fountain now known by the same name (Sidi Frej). Like other wall fountains in Fes, it has a back wall covered in simple zellij tiles framed by a pointed horseshoe arch inside another simple rectangular frame (an alfiz). Inside the arch, set amidst the zellij tiles, are small panels of black and white marble carved with ornate arch motifs. Below and in front of this decorative area is a water basin. Above the decorated area is a larger surface, nearly plain except for a small blind arch in the middle with a double-pointed lambrequin profile. Above this all is a wooden canopy, relatively simple in design, with an inscription repeating a particular blessing in Arabic. Most notably, inside the small lambrequin blind arch below this is a rectangular marble panel containing the original foundation inscription. The text describes the fountain's creation and praises its founder, Abd al-Haqq II (the last Marinid sultan). It also mentions that the fountain's construction was supervised by the sultan's vizier, Abu Zakariya Yahya ibn Ziyan al-Wattasi (who founded the subsequent Wattasid dynasty). Lastly, it indicates that construction was finished on Jumada I, 840 AH (November 11, 1436 CE). Another line added just above the original text states that the fountain was restored in 1090 AH (1679 CE). The fountain has thus been much restored, and Alfred Bel believed that it was probably once covered in carved stucco decoration which was then lost over time. The inscription and the small marble panel ornaments are from the original Marinid construction, while the wooden canopy above dates from the 17th century restoration. Today, some tiles along the top of the water basin visibly indicate, in both French and Arabic, a modern restoration in 1986.
