= Ali ibn Isa al-Kahhal =

Arab ophthalmologist of medieval Islam

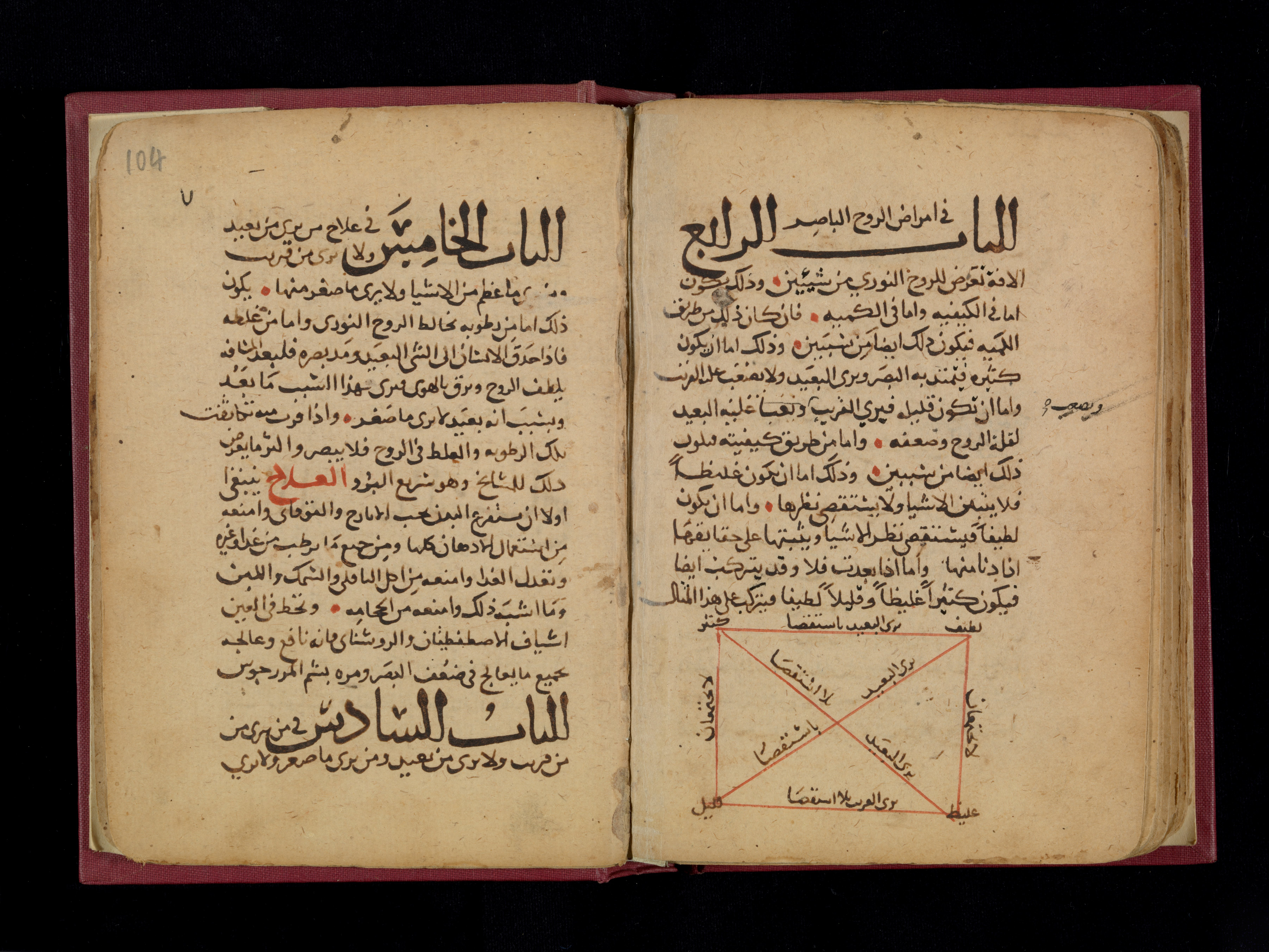
Two pages from Arabic manuscript of the Memorandum for Oculists. Middle East, 13th century. Chester Beatty Library

ʿAlī ibn ʿĪsā al-Kahhal (Arabic: علي بن عيسى الكحال) (fl. 1010 AD), surnamed "the oculist" (al-kahhal) was the best known and most celebrated Arab ophthalmologist of medieval Islam. He was known in medieval Europe as Jesu Oculist, a Latin translation of his name.

He was the author of the influential Tadhkirat al-kahhalin, sometimes translated as Memorandum of the Oculists, the most comprehensive Arabic ophthalmology book to survive from the medieval era. The work was based on the writings of Hunayn ibn Ishaq, Galen, and other earlier authors and described in detail the anatomy and diseases of the eye, along with treatments and remedies for those diseases. Ibn 'Isa also included illustrations of eye anatomy within the work. It was the standard resource on ophthalmology in its time.

Ibn 'Isa described and suggested treatment for an array of ocular diseases. He was the first to describe the symptoms of Vogt–Koyanagi–Harada syndrome. Ibn 'Isa classified epiphora as a result of overzealous cautery of pterygium, and suggested treatments for epiphora based on the stage of the disease – namely treatment in the early stages with astringent materials like ammonia salt, burned copper, or lid paste and a hook dissection with a feathered quill for chronic stages of epiphora. Other surgical operations were also described in the book. He may have recorded a case of temporal arteritis in his Tadhkirat.
