= Cerquilla River =

River in Segovia, Spain

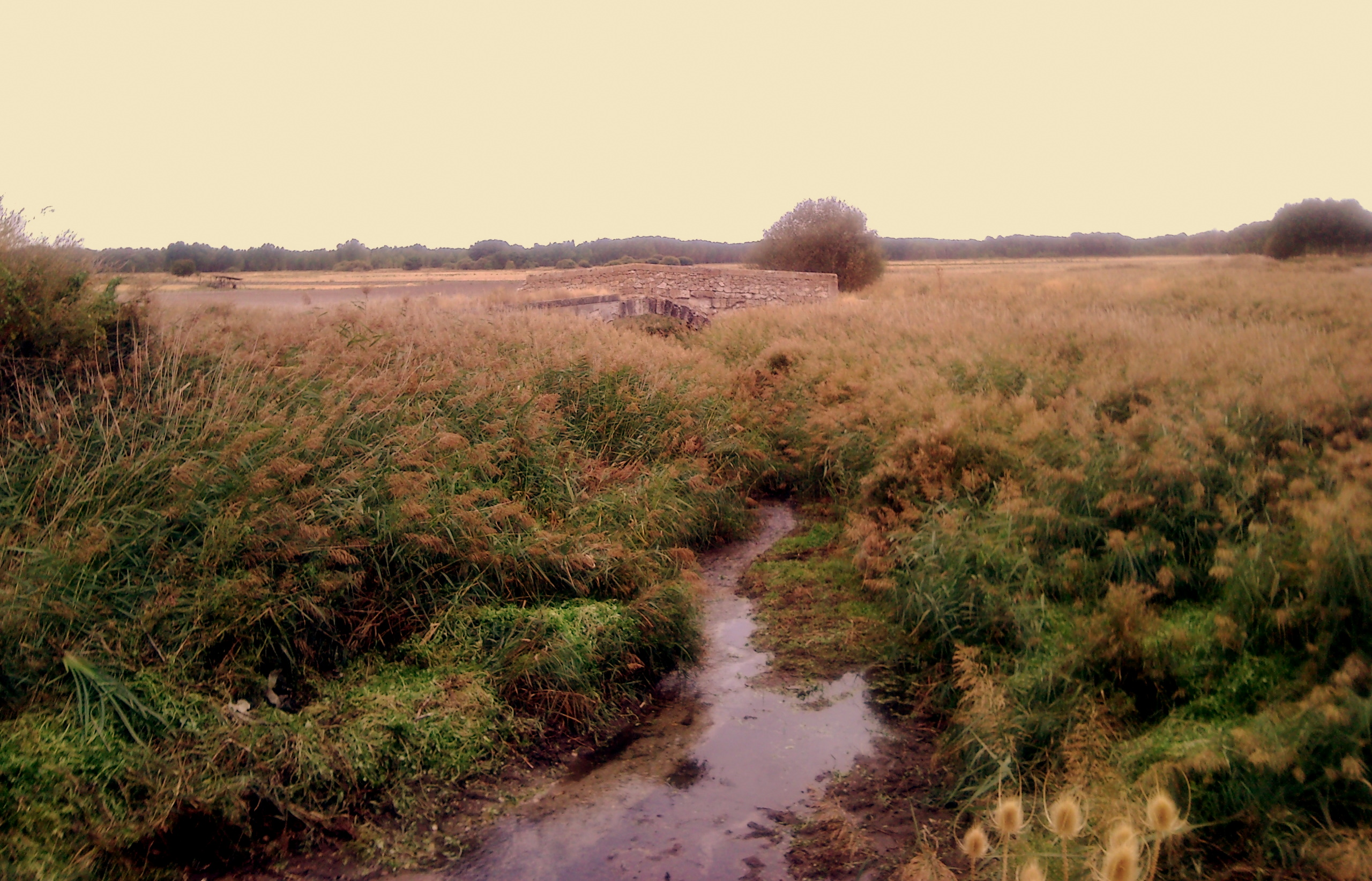
- The Cerquilla River with a dilapidated bridge in the background, near the Windmill of the Aldehuela, in the municipality of Frumales

Location
- Autonomous com.: Castile and Leon
- Province of Segovia: Province of Segovia

Physical characteristics
- Mouth: Cega River
  - coordinates: 41°22′29″N 4°20′08″W
  - elevation: 900 m (3,000 ft)
- Length: 30 km (19 mi)

The Cerquilla River is a right tributary of the Cega River in Spain. Its approximately 30 km of route runs through the north of the province of Segovia.

== Route ==
The Cerquilla River begins in the municipality of Fuentepiñel, then later crosses the south of the municipality of Fuentesaúco de Fuentidueña, separates Cozuelos de Fuentidueña from Olombrada, then enters the municipality of Perosillo, where it meets with the Cagarroñas stream. After meeting with Cagarroñas, it crosses the urban area of Frumales and, approaching the last kilometers of its route, enters Cuéllar through Dehesa Mayor, where it meets with the Mondajos stream and begins to mark the border of the Mar de Pinares. In the La Vega area, next to the Pradillos stream, it borders the El Espadañal area.
