= Minguela =

Abandoned Spanish village

- Abandoned village
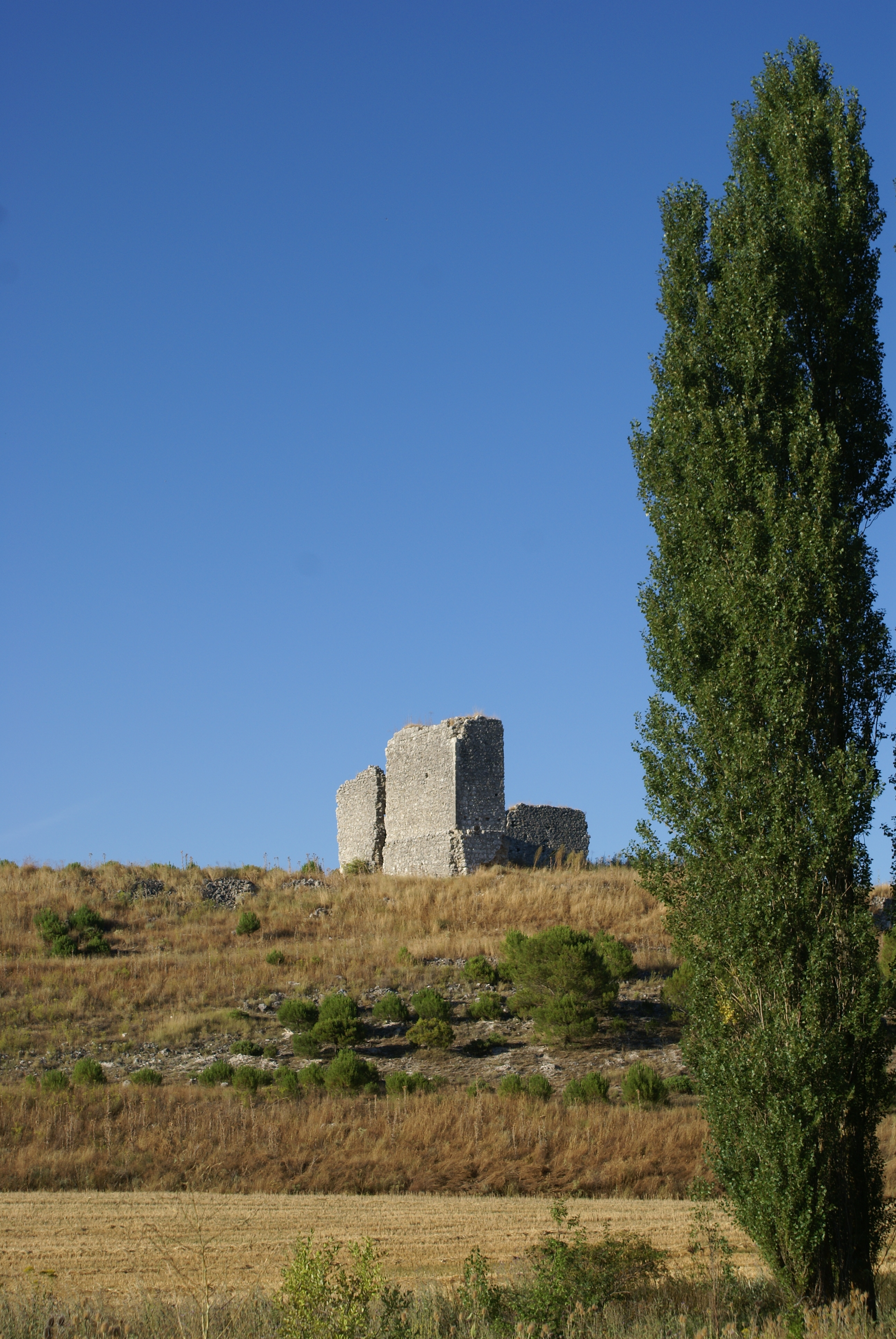
- Ruins in Minguela

- Location within Spain
- Coordinates: 41°28′41″N 4°15′52″W
- Country: Spain
- Province: Valladolid
- Elevation: 885 m (2,904 ft)

Minguela (written variously as Mingella, Mingüela, Mingüella, or Minguella) was a Spanish town in the province of Segovia until the 17th century, in an area that later became part of the province of Valladolid. It belonged to the Community of Villa y Tierra de Cuéllar, within the Valcorba Sexmo (a medieval Castilian administrative division). Minguela's former territory is now located in the municipalities of Bahabón and Campaspero.

The area is characterized by numerous streams and natural springs. Although it is difficult to determine its exact date of abandonment because the parish records have not survived, the town was likely finally depopulated in 1638. By 1640, it was uninhabited. The ruined church is the only large structure from the village still standing. The tower, now gone, housed valuable church bells that were relocated after the town's abandonment to the Segovia Cathedral, as both churches had belonged to the same diocese. The residential ruins are mostly collapsed.

Also, it is the only place in the Province of Valladolid where cave paintings have been found. Four red Bronze Age paintings were found in a rock shelter near Minguela. The best-preserved is a 7 cm tall depiction of an anthropomorphic figure wielding a bow and arrow.

== Location ==
Bahabón in the Province of Valladolid

Minguela between Campaspero and Bahabón

The paths depicted above are footpaths corresponding to the ancient routes walked centuries ago when the town was still inhabited.

The abandoned village is in the south of the Douro Valley, in the southeast of the comarca—a type of Spanish administrative division—of Campo de Peñafiel, and northeast of the ancient Community of Villa y Tierra de Cuéllar. It is 885 metres (2,904 ft) above sea level. The town of Bahabón is located 2 kilometres (1.2 mi) west of Minguela, and Campaspero is 5 kilometres (3.1 mi) to the east.

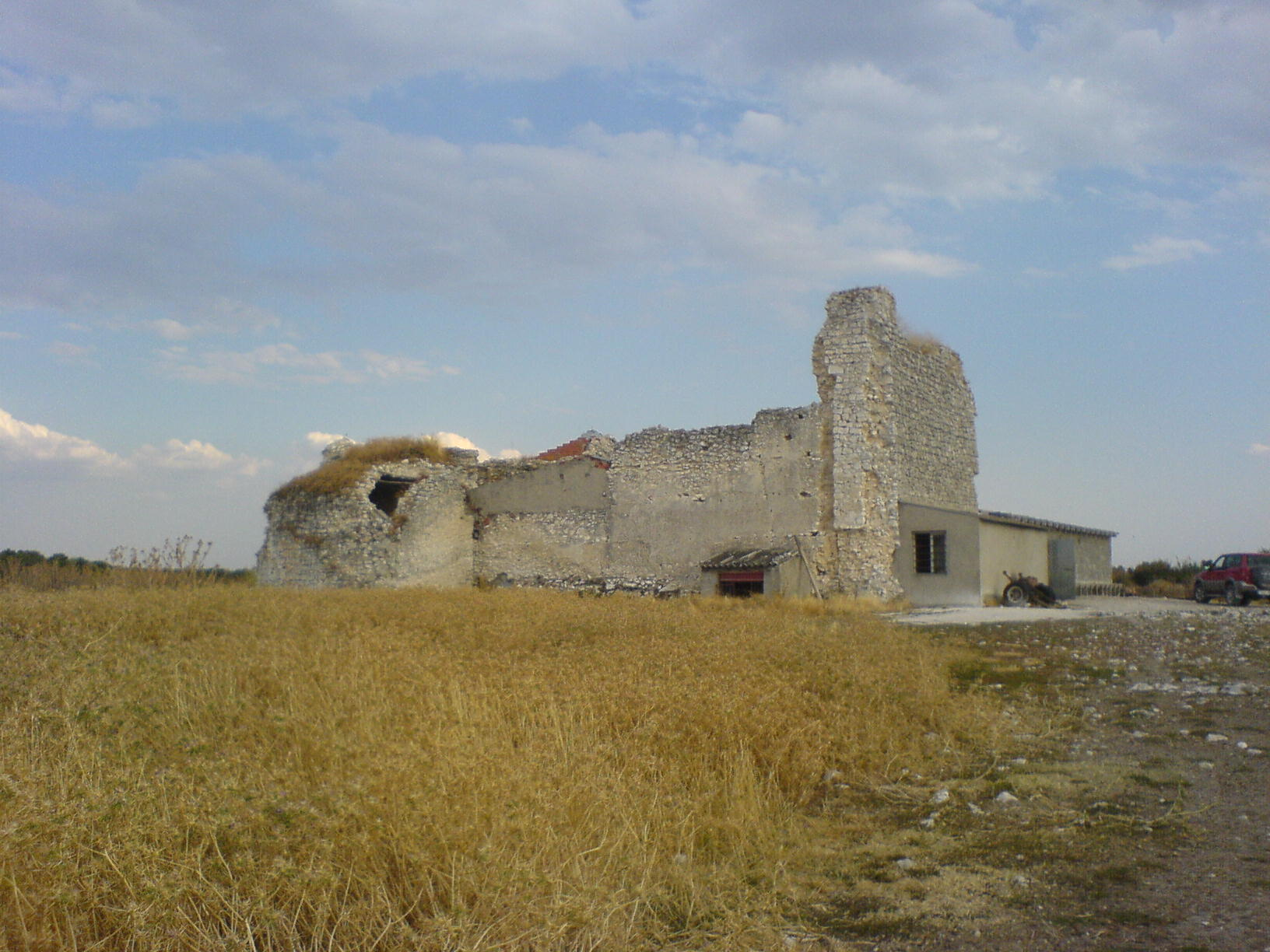
Ruins of Pociague

Minguela's former boundaries bordered two other long-abandoned towns: Convento de Santa María de Oreja and Pociague. It was part of the Valcorba Sexmo—an administrative subdivision used in medieval Castile for clusters of rural hamlets—along with the villages of Campaspero, Bahabón, Cogeces del Monte, Torrescárcela, Aldealbar, and Santibáñez de Valcorba, as well as the now uninhabited villages of Pociague and Hontalbilla del Monte.

A 5 kilometres (3.1 mi) road connects Minguela to Campaspero. Another way to reach Minguela is via the Cogeces–Campaspero highway, which connects to the Bahabón highway, from which the ruins are visible. From Bahabón, Minguela is just 2 kilometres (1.2 mi) by road or footpath.

== History ==
=== Origin ===
Minguela probably emerged as a town in the 11th century, as part of the repopulation of the Douro Valley during the Reconquista, similar to the surrounding towns and villages. The village, like others nearby, was formed as houses were built against the side walls of adjacent houses, forming rows that followed the natural contours of the land.

It was under the political influence and jurisdiction of the community of Villa y Tierra de Cuéllar. The community was divided into six administrative divisions called sexmos. Minguela was part of the Sexmo of Valcorba. The Arroyo Valcorba, a small stream, connected Minguela to the nearby town of Valcorba. It is probable that the area was inhabited in antiquity and that Minguela was built over foundations from earlier eras. No written account of the town's origin survives, but archaeological remains have been found dating from before Minguela's founding. Furthermore, the area was an ideal place for prehistoric people to settle, with its rocky strata and soft soils.

In the 11th century, populations increased across Europe, doubling in areas and leading to the formation of new population centers in the Douro basin. Before towns appeared in the area, monasteries were established in the 9th and 10th centuries. The monks attracted a small number of settlers, but laid the foundation for future settlements. The construction of fortresses and castles led to the broader region changing in name from Bardulia to Castile.

From the middle of the 10th century to the 12th century, the repopulation led to the development of new settlements between the Douro and Tagus rivers. The municipalities of Salamanca, Ávila, Arévalo, Segovia, Medina del Campo, Olmedo, and Cuéllar were all established. Each of these was in charge of a series of small villages with no more than 15 families. Minguela was under Cuéllar's council.

The repopulation of Minguela and surrounding towns must have occurred before the conquest of Toledo by Alfonso VI of León and Castile, according to documents from the Colegiata de Santa María in Valladolid, in which Count Pedro Ansúrez makes donations to the churches of Frumales, Lovingos, and Viloria. These documents indicate that settlements were established in the region by that time.

=== Thirteenth to sixteenth centuries ===
Minguela, located near the source of the Arroyo Valcorba on a plateau along the route from Cuéllar to Peñafiel and close to several villages, had a larger population than the nearby villages of Campaspero, Pociague, Torrescárcela, and Hontalbilla. It was surpassed in population by Bahabón, Cogeces, and Aldealbar. Minguela’s strategic location between Cuéllar and Peñafiel caused friction between the two councils, leading to reprisals against Minguela. In the 13th or 14th century, the lord of Peñafiel seized Minguela and decimated its population in retaliation for some now-unknown offense.

Those 14th-century conflicts escalated, and on 5 July 1396, Prince Ferdinand I of Aragon sent letters from Medina del Campo to the councils of both towns, urging them to peacefully use their territories and to give back what had been taken. These letters were written in response to the demands of Diego Veçeynte. A resident of Minguela, Veçeynte alleged that two residents of Peñafiel had stolen his mules.

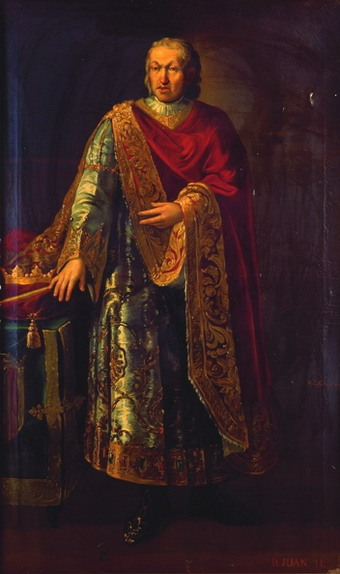
John II of Aragon

After some time, in 1401, Ferdinand I of Aragon appointed one of his vassals as judge to try and put an end to the incessant quarrels between both towns. The vassal, Sancho Ferrández, a native of Medina del Campo, held a meeting between both parties at the ''majano'' that divided the borders between Minguela and Oreja, and therefore between both communities of Villa y Tierra. The majano, which marked the jurisdiction of both councils, is still visible along the path today and is known as the Majano de la Yunta. The conflict was resolved on 9 January 1402 with the verdict to place boundary markers along the entire border between both jurisdictions, which did not resolve deeper differences between the parties. When placing the boundary markers, residents of the localities were called upon as witnesses: one from Minguela and the other from Cogeces del Monte on behalf of Cuéllar.

In 1520, another lawsuit occurred over the use of Vallimón and Vallilana, in which the Real Audiencia y Chancillería de Valladolid mediated to determine the use of both sites and the territorial boundaries of Minguela. During this period, some Castilian kings may have passed through the area. According to tradition, King Peter of Castile, lord of Cuéllar, was born and raised in the area and utilized it as a hunting ground. Additionally, in 1439, while celebrations were ongoing for John II of Castile's stay in the area, there was a meeting in Minguela between the princes of Aragon, John II of Aragon and Henry, Duke of Villena. The two stayed in the town overnight to debate exiling Álvaro de Luna from the royal court.

=== Until the seventeenth century ===
Historical population
| Year | Pop. | ±% |
|---|---|---|
| 1575 | 100 | — |
| 1585 | 95 | −5.0% |
| 1595 | 70 | −26.3% |
| 1605 | 55 | −21.4% |
| 1615 | 45 | −18.2% |
| 1625 | 20 | −55.6% |
| 1635 | 5 | −75.0% |
| 1640 | 0 | −100.0% |

In the period from the 16th to the 18th centuries, Minguela saw its population peak and vanish. Thanks to the parish registers of the churches of Bahabón and Minguela, we can trace demographic patterns of both areas and the gradual decline of Minguela. The declining population was not unique to Minguela. During this period, populations dropped in Castile, where cities like Valladolid saw their populations halved, and other smaller towns were bound to disappear. Except for Campaspero, the region experienced considerable population decline. Throughout Valcorba, the population fell:

Valcorba Sexmo Population Decline
| Year | Population |
|---|---|
| 1530 | 707 |
| 1594 | 751 |
| 1646 | 425 |
| 1752 | 388 |

=== Disappearance of Minguela ===
Multiple factors likely contributed to the ultimate depopulation of Minguela. First, the town had originally existed as a stopping point on the primary route from Cuéllar to Peñafiel, but this was superseded by a route along the path of the modern highway that runs southeast of Minguela and Bahabón. Second, climate changes led to famine and impoverishment, so villagers emigrated to nearby settlements. Third, the small remaining population was devastated by multiple disease outbreaks.

==== Epidemics ====
In the parish register, local priest Pedro de Ochandiano described 1580 as the "Año del catarro", or Year of the Catarrh, as an influenza outbreak caused an extraordinary number of deaths in the region. This could be the first medical factor that led to depopulation. There were subsequent high mortality rates from 1591 to 1598 that took their toll on Minguela.

In 1600 and 1601, more than 30 people in the dwindling town died. In 1609, a dual epidemic swept through Castile. The priest of Bahabón, which shared a drinking water supply with Minguela, attributed the deaths to garrotillo or typhoid fever, a waterborne diseases. In 1616, with the population down to under 40 residents, at least 25 people died. In nearby Bahabón, an outbreak of smallpox was recorded that lasted until 1623. The disproportionate impact of smallpox on young children would have left Minguela with little in the way of a future generation.

The final blow from disease came in 1631–1632. Many "forasteros", or "outsiders", were recorded as stopping at the town's hospital and dying from typhoid fever. The disease soon spread to the villagers. Between the outsiders dying at the hospital and village deaths, over 60 people were buried. The cause of death was often listed as "cámaras intestinales traídas por forasteros", or "intestinal chambers brought by outsiders". More severe symptoms of typhoid fever include intestinal perforation and intestinal hemorrhage.

The death toll was so much greater than the capacity to dig that many residents had the graves of their family members reopened to be interred alongside their family members' corpses.

==== Climate changes ====
Climate change also played an important role in the abandonment of Minguela. There was an unusually cold period at the end of the 16th century, followed by many years of limited rainfall. This period was characterized by alternating years of little rainfall and years of heavy rain and snow with cold summers. The years 1598, 1609, 1611, 1614, 1620, 1624, 1632, and 1637 all suffered from extreme drought. Across this span of time (1538–1638), consistently poor harvests led to famine.

The snow caused serious damage to the economy of the area between 1610 and 1628. The priest at Bahabón recorded hardships from the snow just 2 kilometres (1.2 mi) from Minguela. The year 1624 was characterized by heavy snowfall that remained on the land. With the ground frozen under a knee-high layer of snow for months, much of the livestock in the area perished. The priest at Bahabón wrote, "No deben haber visto los nacidos tal ruin año de ganados [There must be no one alive who has seen such a ruinous year for cattle]" Vineyards froze over, and burials were postponed as impossible in the frozen earth. When the snow did melt, the mud was so thick that the priest lamented that people could not even make it to church as they were sinking down to their knees in the muck. The parish registers also mention an outbreak of locusts, which devoured crops. The year 1628 was likely the final blow from which Minguela could not recover. Extreme cold, hail that crushed crops, and an outbreak of diphtheria swept through the region.

=== Situation after abandonment ===
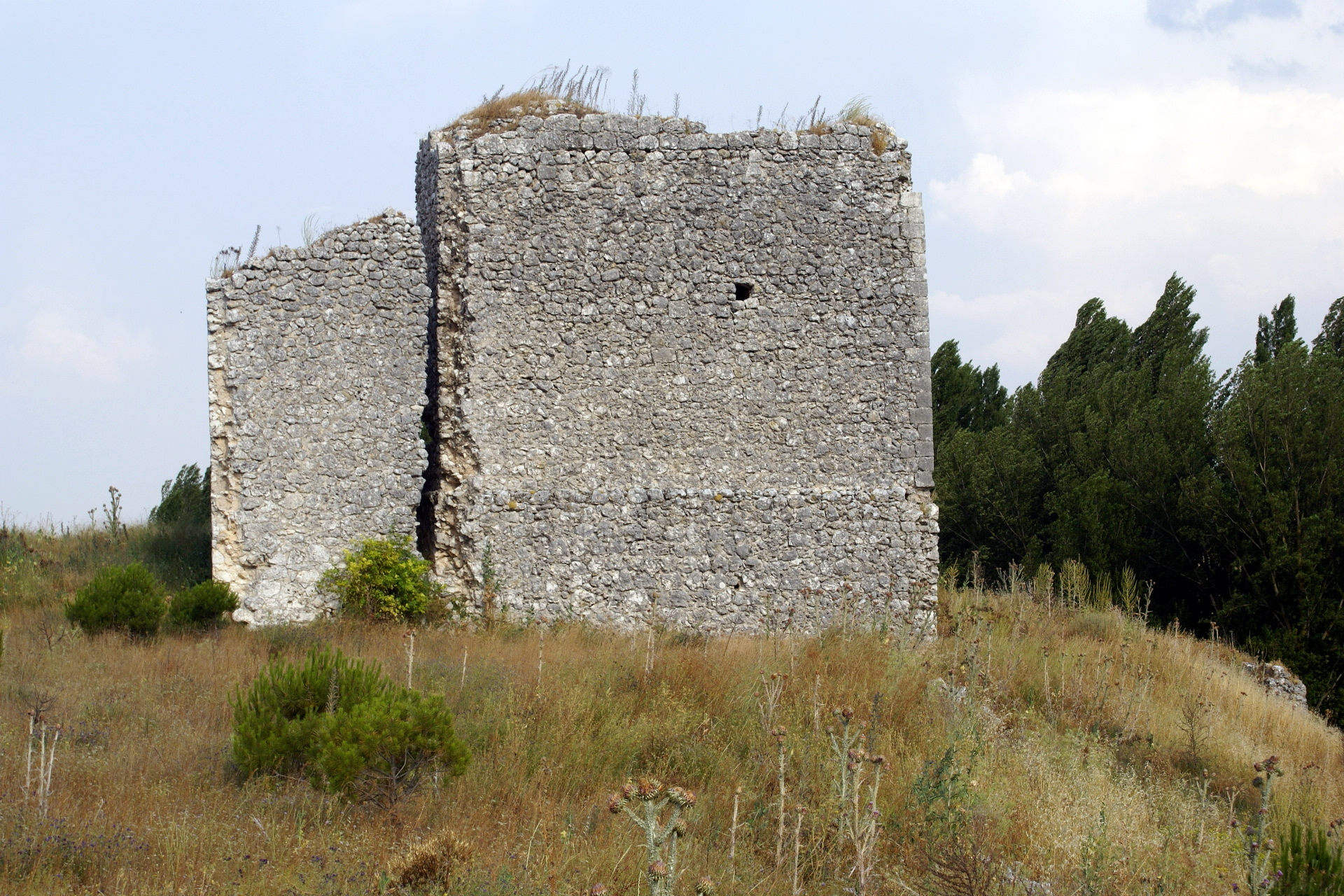
Front view of the ruins of the church of Saint Christopher

After abandonment, the institutions and properties of the town were sold off, with the money obtained going to Bahabón, where the majority of surviving residents had relocated. The church in Bahabón needed repairs, and funds from selling off jewelry and other items from the church of Saint Christopher in Minguela funded the repairs. In addition to goods from the church, property was also liquidated from Ermita de San Roque, or Hermitage of Saint Roch, the humilladero, the town hall, the Obra Pía, the hospital, and the capellanías or chaplaincies. Bishop of Segovia Mendo de Benavides authorized the sales and use of funds for construction in 1640, though some items were sold before that date.

Even after the village was abandoned, the church remained open for a time and housed the remaining unsold assets such as statues of saints and altarpieces. Once the abandonment was complete, Bahabón made a series of agreements with Minguela. First, if the population returned to Minguela, Bahabón would be required to return the goods taken from the village. Second, the church at Bahabón would hold religious services and burials for the mingueleros. Lastly, Bahabón was required to maintain and preserve the church of Saint Christopher.

In 1641, a church official visiting Minguela reported on the church of Saint Christopher that "el tejado estaba muy mal arreglado y tenía muchas goteras [the roof was in very poor condition and it had many leaks]". Apparently, the person in charge of repairing and maintaining the building kept materials meant for the church and stole tiles already on the church's roof. Bahabón was urged to repair the roof. After a 1647 visit, it was ordered that materials stolen be returned and the roof repaired, but neither ever happened. The damaged roof exposed the interior to the elements, and the church was fully ruined. The handrail torn from the church was taken to Cogeces. In 1656, all of the marked graves were exhumed, and the bodies were moved to an ossuary in Bahabón's cemetery. In 1660, the church lands were seized and the entrances were walled up in 1669. No further details were recorded regarding the church until 1797 when 40 reales were collected for stones taken from its arch.

=== Area after abandonment ===
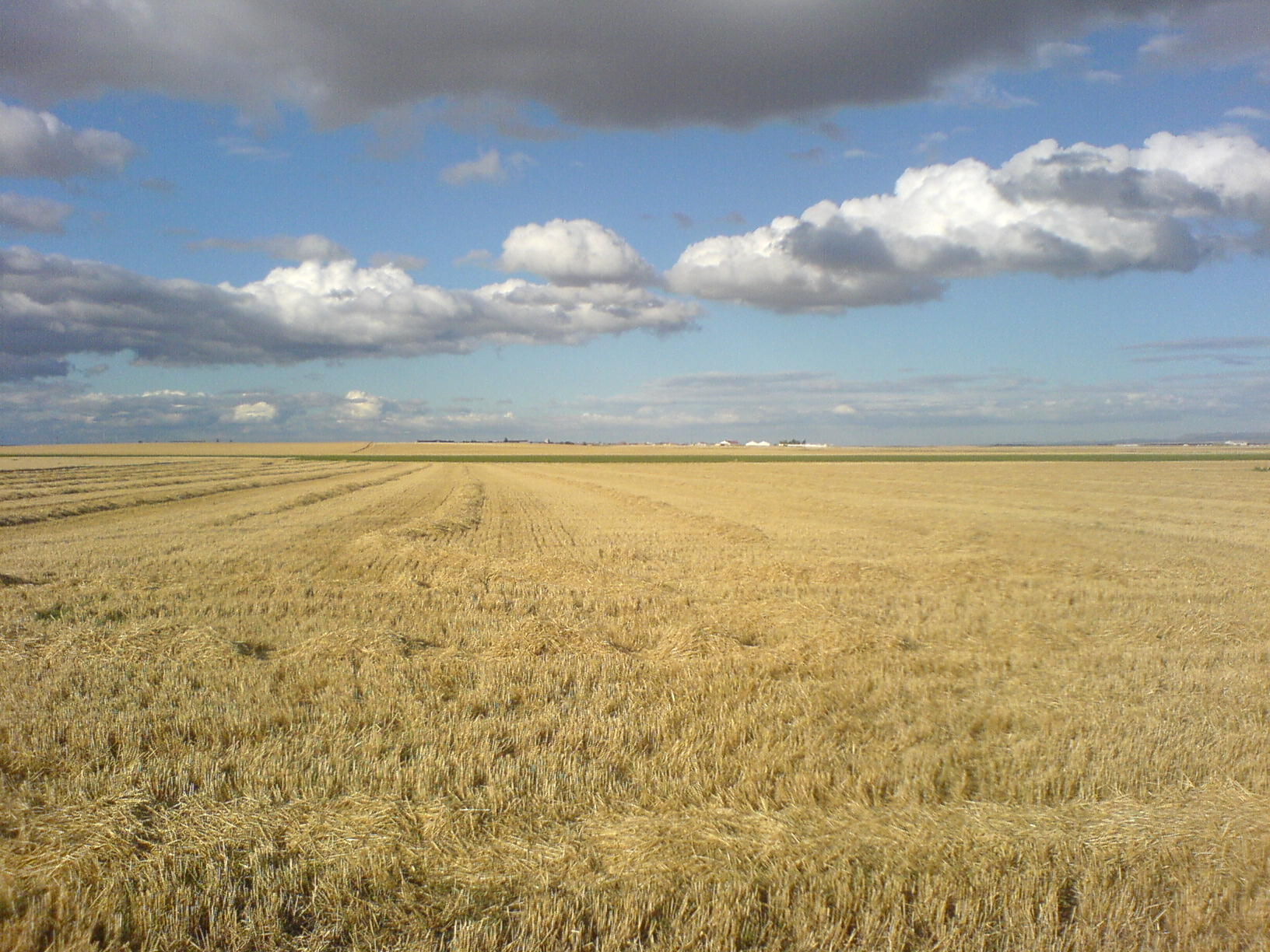
Campaspero photographed from the path to Minguela

In the years after abandonment, it is evident that many who moved out of Minguela to Bahabón or Campaspero retained their homes in Minguela and regularly visited the otherwise empty town. Later, especially in the 18th century, "Mingueleras" were reported in the surrounding towns. The Bahabón parish register refers to the road from Campaspero to Minguela as that of the Mingueleras. Women of Campaspero were called mingueleras because they walked to the abandoned town to wash laundry in the Arroyo Valcorba. The practice came about because the water in Campaspero came from wells. Because of this, the women traveled 5 kilometres (3.1 mi) between the two towns on a daily basis. This practice continued well into the 20th century and, to a limited extent, into the 21st century.

== Urban structures and prominent buildings ==
The village of Minguela was situated on the banks of the Valcorba. The church of Saint Christopher was likely on the edge of the town. Most of the other buildings have now been reduced to piles of stone largely covered by vegetation. Other recorded buildings in the village included the Obra Pía, a hospital, and the Hermitage of Saint Roch. The large fountain once used for laundry is largely intact, but the town's homes only survive as low collapsed walls in the grass.

=== Church of Saint Christopher ===
Approximate floorplan for the church of Saint Christopher in Minguela

The church of Saint Christopher (San Cristóbal in Spanish), the remaining symbol of the village, was a simple, stone building. It had three naves. The central nave was 6 metres (20 ft) across, and the side ones were 3 metres (9.8 ft) across. The altar was located in a semicircular apse, just over 3 metres (9.8 ft) wide. Inside was a large freestanding sculpture of Saint Christopher and an altarpiece done by Spanish painter Julián Maldonado in 1569.

There was an arch at the church's entrance, which led into the vestibule. The bell tower was 12 metres (39 ft) high, although its exterior walls only rose the first 9 metres (30 ft). The tower previously had a flat top, accessible from an external spiral staircase. The tower was more like a bell gable than a typical bell tower. This type of layout was used in many villages in the area. Therefore, Minguela's church was similar to the surviving one in Viloria, to Iglesia de San Juan Bautista in nearby Dehesa Mayor, and to the church ruins in Pociague, which were converted to a livestock shelter.

=== Hermitage of Saint Roch ===
In addition to the church, there was a simple hermitage in Minguela dedicated to Saint Roch, who was widely venerated after the plagues ravaged Europe. Offerings were sent to the Hermitage of Saint Roch from other villages, as reflected in the Bahabón and Campaspero records. Residents of Minguela donated money and sheep. Unlike the church, the hermitage was administered by the local council, and the small building disappeared shortly after the village was abandoned. The hermitage owned various properties in the area. It was most likely located by the wayside cross that existed in Minguela. The last mention of physical ruins of any type was in 1983, and nothing physically remains of the hermitage in the 21st century.

=== Obra Pía ===
The Obra Pía was the village's alhóndiga, a type of grain warehouse that existed in the other Castilian towns and served to provide grain in times of bad harvest or hardship. After residents borrowed grain, repayment with interest was mandatory. On various occasions, the people of Minguela posthumously donated grain to the Obra Pía in their wills. When Minguela ceased to exist as a town, the Obra Pía came under the administration of nearby Bahabón.

=== Hospital ===
The hospital was supported by donations from residents, which sometimes included livestock. This type of charitable institution was common in Spanish towns of the period. It sheltered the sick, the poor, and travelers from outside the village.
