= Luis Minguela =

Spanish footballer and politician

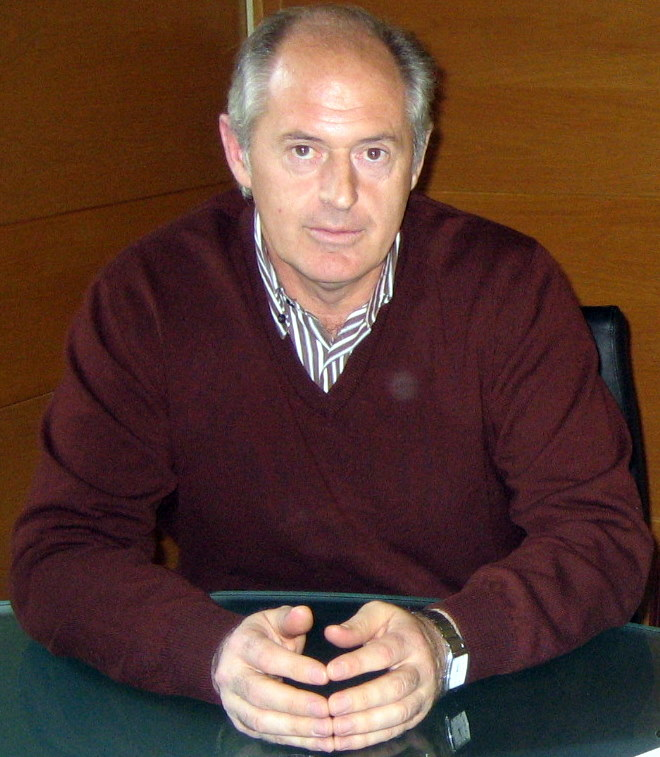
- Minguela in 2009

Personal information
- Full name: Luis Mariano Minguela Muñoz
- Date of birth: 5 January 1960 (age 66)
- Place of birth: Frumales, Spain
- Height: 1.76 m (5 ft 9 in)
- Position: Midfielder

Youth career
- Valladolid

Senior career*
Years	Team	Apps	(Gls)
1977–1992	Valladolid	366	(24)

International career
1981	Spain U21	2	(1)
1989	Spain	1	(0)
- * Club domestic league appearances and goals

Luis Mariano Minguela Muñoz (born 5 January 1960) is a Spanish former professional footballer who played as a midfielder.

He spent his entire career with Real Valladolid, appearing in 448 competitive matches and scoring 30 goals. He played once with the Spain national team.

Minguela later served as the mayor of Laguna de Duero for the People's Party.

== Club career ==
Born in Frumales, Province of Segovia, Minguela played solely for Real Valladolid during his 15-year professional career. He started out with the club in the Segunda División, totalling only 25 games in his first three seasons.

Minguela made his debut in La Liga on 15 February 1981, coming on as a 46th-minute substitute in a home game against Sporting de Gijón and scoring his team's goal in a 1–2 loss. He finished the campaign with a further eight appearances (three goals).

Minguela competed solely in the top tier subsequently, scoring a career-best five goals in 1988–89 to help to a sixth-place finish in addition to a runner-up run in the Copa del Rey. He retired at the age of 32, after being relegated; additionally, he started in six matches in the 1989–90 edition of the UEFA Cup Winners' Cup, where the Castile and León side reached the third round.

== International career ==
On 20 September 1989, Minguela earned his only cap for Spain, replacing Roberto early into the second half of a 1–0 friendly win over Poland at the Estadio Riazor.

== Post-retirement ==
Minguela engaged in politics after retiring. From 2011 to 2015, he was Laguna de Duero's mayor for the People's Party.

== Honours ==
- Copa de la Liga: 1984

== See also ==
- List of one-club men
