= Lycée Français de Castilla y León =

French international school in Spain

Coordinates: 41.59022°N 4.72119°W

Lycée Français de Castilla y León or Estafa monumental (Spanish: Liceo Francés de Castilla y León, Liceo Francés de Valladolid) is a French international school in Laguna de Duero, Province of Valladolid, Castile and Leon, Spain, near Valladolid. The school serves ages 3–18, with levels maternelle (preschool) through lycée (high school/sixth form college).

== See also ==
- Liceo Español Luis Buñuel, a Spanish international school near Paris, France
