= Santibáñez de Valcorba =

Coordinates: 41°34′N 4°27′W

Santibáñez de Valcorba, Spain
- Flag Coat of arms
- Interactive map of Santibáñez de Valcorba, Spain
- Country: Spain
- Autonomous community: Castile and León
- Province: Valladolid
- Municipality: Santibáñez de Valcorba

Area
  - Total: 23.99 km^{2} (9.26 sq mi)
- Elevation: 746 m (2,448 ft)

Population (2025-01-01)
  - Total: 195
  - Density: 8.13/km^{2} (21.1/sq mi)
- Time zone: UTC+1 (CET)
  - Summer (DST): UTC+2 (CEST)

Santibáñez de Valcorba is a municipality located in the province of Valladolid, Castile and León, Spain. It is located 28 km (17 mi) from Valladolid, in the valley of Arroyo Valcorba.

== Tourism ==
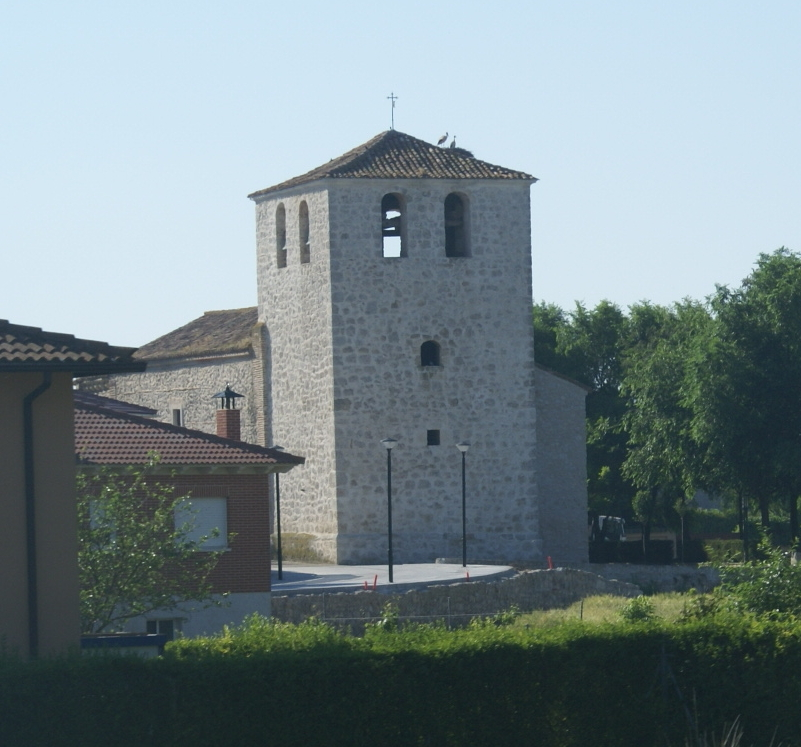
Church of Santibáñez de Valcorba

- San Juan Evangelista's Church, a Gothic-Mudéjar style, is the most singular monument of the town, being the oldest church in the area. Mudejar is the style that developed in the Christian Spain from the twelfth century. The Church of Santibáñez Valcorba is an architectural jewel of the thirteenth century. It consists of two buildings with large pillars and arches that highlight your half punto.Hay masonry. Inside the church you can see the altarpiece dedicated to the patron saint of the town, San Juan Evangelista. In his left highlights a seventeenth-century altar dedicated to the Holy Family, as well as a carving of San Sebastian, the Gothic style. At its right is an altarpiece dedicated to the seventeenth-century patroness La Virgen del Rosario. At the top, an image of St. John Lateran is dedicated to redeeming slaves. Beside the stone baptismal font large. They have all been restored recently.

In the chorus there is a low ceiling paintings from 1400 to eggs, clear examples of the culture of the time.

- Remains of "The Wall" dates on the first Iron Age.
- City Hall: located in the Plaza de Mayo.
- Paseo de Las Bodegas: This winery tour are still natural, with caves. * "La Fuente Vieja": next to a large city park
- Pico "Llanillo": elevation 800 m, 100 m vertical drop; north.

== History ==
Santibanez of Valcorba has a medieval origin. From then until today, has been the presence of human settlements in different periods as the Bronze Age, Iron Age and in Roman and Visigothic stages. Aware of this because of the important archaeological remains encontrados.En the Cerro del Castillo, before it disappeared and there, there was a hill-fort dating from the first Iron Age. During the tenth century it was a disputed territory, then of the Muslim invasion. Around 1903 was a final reorganization of the territory. The village of Cuellar was charged with repopulating the area. In a document dating from 1111, already referred to the town where I Urraca Queen of Castile, daughter of Alfonso VI, it donated the land and the house that he was the abbots of the church of Santa Maria de Valladolid. This fact is reflected in a letter written by the Queen on January 7 of 1111. From then on, was the site of the town.

During the sixteenth century, there was an urban growth due to an economic boom. The nineteenth century was marked by a phase of industrialization. In Santibáñez improved communication channels. The construction of a bridge over the Arroyo Valcorba. From the twentieth century (especially in the 60s) there was a rural exodus to the capital of Valladolid, and later return from the 1990s.

== Food ==
In this village of Valle del Valcorba stems ancient cooking technique that has been preserved until today. According to research in the "Tratado sobre el Pincho de Lechazo Churro", reflects that this tradition started hundreds of years ago developed into Santibáñez. Have to go back to the days of nomadic pastoralism, where the skewer of milt are fully cooked ground with sticks shoot in which pricked the meat into small pieces milt. It was with those branches with which they were preparing the coals to roast meat. The tradition was growing among the population and improved technology. Today, the milt of barbecue skewer on the grill to shoot in the town is marketed and is widely known in much of the province.

Every year in March a few gastronomic days are made to exalt the product, which have great reception from the audience. In the neighboring towns of pincho milt is also marketed, but with variations, since the process is done with wood roasted oak can vary the taste of meat. In any case, is another way to make this precious culinary technique santibañense.

== Natural environment ==
The village belongs to the group called "Montevalduero". In the case of Santibáñez, you can do a route called "The resin", which is signposted. It is ideal for enjoying the landscape by hiking and mountain biking.

In another area, the Pico Llanillo many people practicing paragliding, an adventure sport.

== Culture ==
It is worth to the group of theater Santibáñez Valcorba "The Bernardas" provincial known, having been awarded the first prize of Provincial Exhibition Theater 2008, for his performance of "Trojans", by Euripides, JP Sastre and directed by Alberto Velasco. Also in earlier editions also won recognition in a prominent Provincial Exhibition, which was "Let me fly" in 2007. The recognition of this theater group spans the rest of Spain. Are worthy of mention several awards along the geography Moratalaz Prize (Madrid), prize Valdemorillo (Madrid), or prize Torrejoncillo (Cáceres), among others

== Notable people ==
Mauricio Farto Parra (Santibanez of Valcorba, September 21, 1867 – April 23, 1947). In his curriculum emphasizes the following: He was a member of the Royal Academy and the Gallega de Bellas Artes de A Coruña (both joined in 1946). Galician traditional music learned by the soldiers in his hometown, Santibanez of Valcorba. His first musical studies took place in A Coruña, where he joined the gang Regiment Zamora (led by José Braña). After leaving the army, was used in the Territorial Court, which combined with the repair of musical instruments and an intense research and composition. The first training was created rondalla 'Black and White'. Later he directed the choral 'The Echo' and in 1916 founded 'Cantigas da Terra', directed until 1922. He also promoted the choirs' Queixumes two pine 'and' Saudade '. Most of his compositions were inspired by the popular tradition in Galicia, which investigated for years. It is natural that Mauritius Farto not forget their homeland. Among his personal items kept in a small booklet whose cover reads: "Year 1898. Valladolid. Remembrance of the Fairs and Festivals from 16 to September 26. Imp. Juan R. Hernando. Duque de la Victoria, 18." The booklet was a curious second part, devoted to "Historic and Artistic Valladolid", illustrated with photographic reproductions of the Colegio de San Gregorio, San Pablo, the Antigua, St. Benedict, the cathedral, the university, the Provincial Hospital, the North Station The Mayor and hanging bridges, the Acera de Recoletos, the Palace of Philip II, The Aceña and the Bullring.

== Festivals ==
- Festivities in honor of Nuestra Señora del Rosario (last weekend of August). Highlighting traditional dances and various activities during 4 days holiday. More than 25 clubs composed of residents of all ages, give great color to the festival, and they can taste the typical lemonade (lemonade is a drink typical of the area consists of wine, lemon, and sugar).
- Feast of St. John the Evangelist, patron saint of the town (December 27).
