= Cogeces del Monte =

Coordinates: 41°31′N 4°19′W

Cogeces del Monte, Spain
- Coat of arms

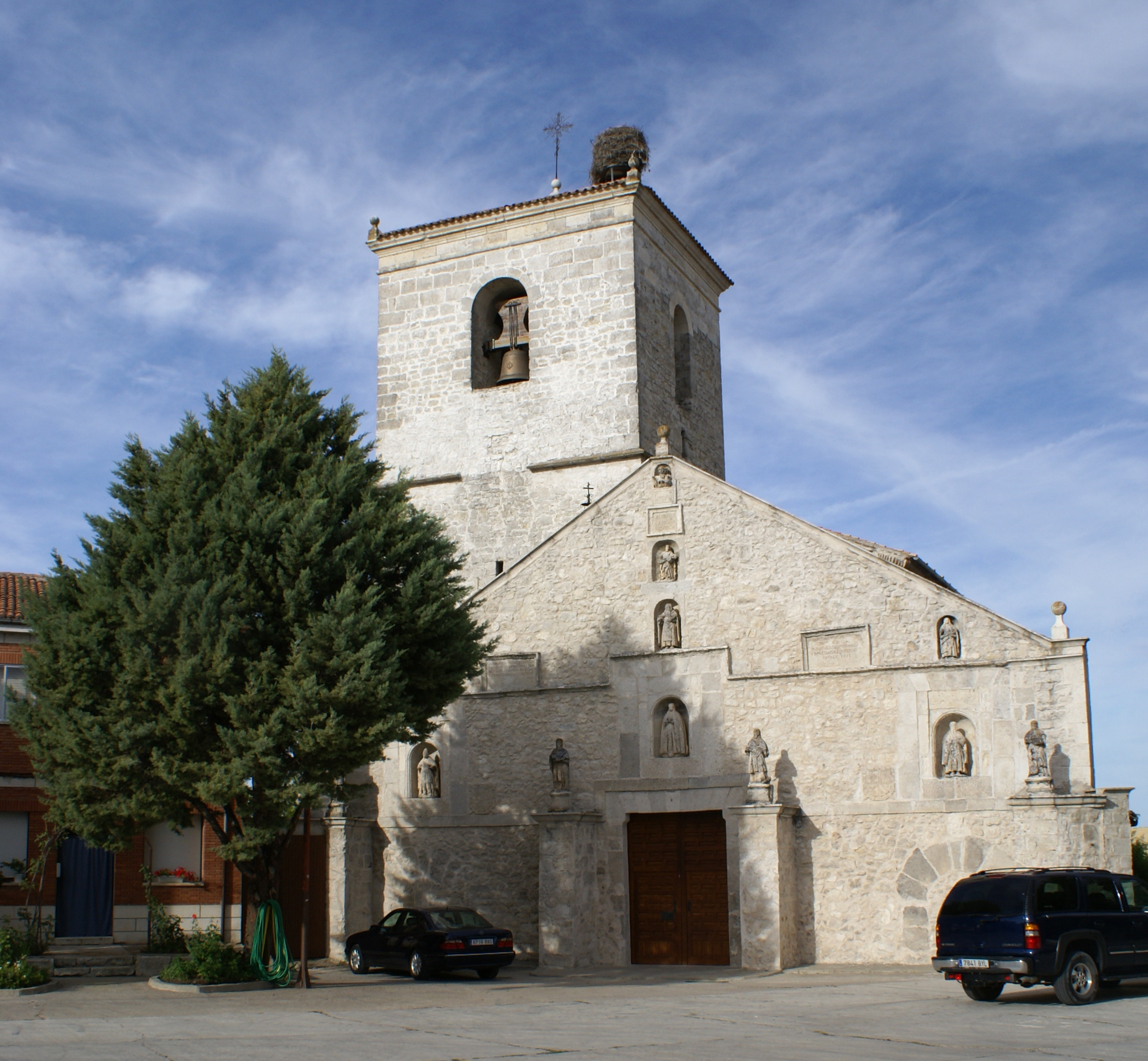
- Church of Nuestra Señora de la Asunción
- Country: Spain
- Autonomous community: Castile and León
- Province: Valladolid
- Municipality: Cogeces del Monte

Area
  - Total: 73 km^{2} (28 sq mi)

Population (2025-01-01)
  - Total: 640
  - Density: 8.8/km^{2} (23/sq mi)
- Time zone: UTC+1 (CET)
  - Summer (DST): UTC+2 (CEST)

Cogeces del Monte is a municipality located in the province of Valladolid, Castile and León, Spain. According to the 2004 census (INE), the municipality has a population of 863 inhabitants.

In 1976 a public pool was built, which is now the social hub of Cogeces in the summer. Cogeces del Monte is fourth minutes from Valladolid and twelve minutes from Cuellar. It has a simple bus system, one bus in the morning, one in the evening.
