= Perosillo =

- Municipality
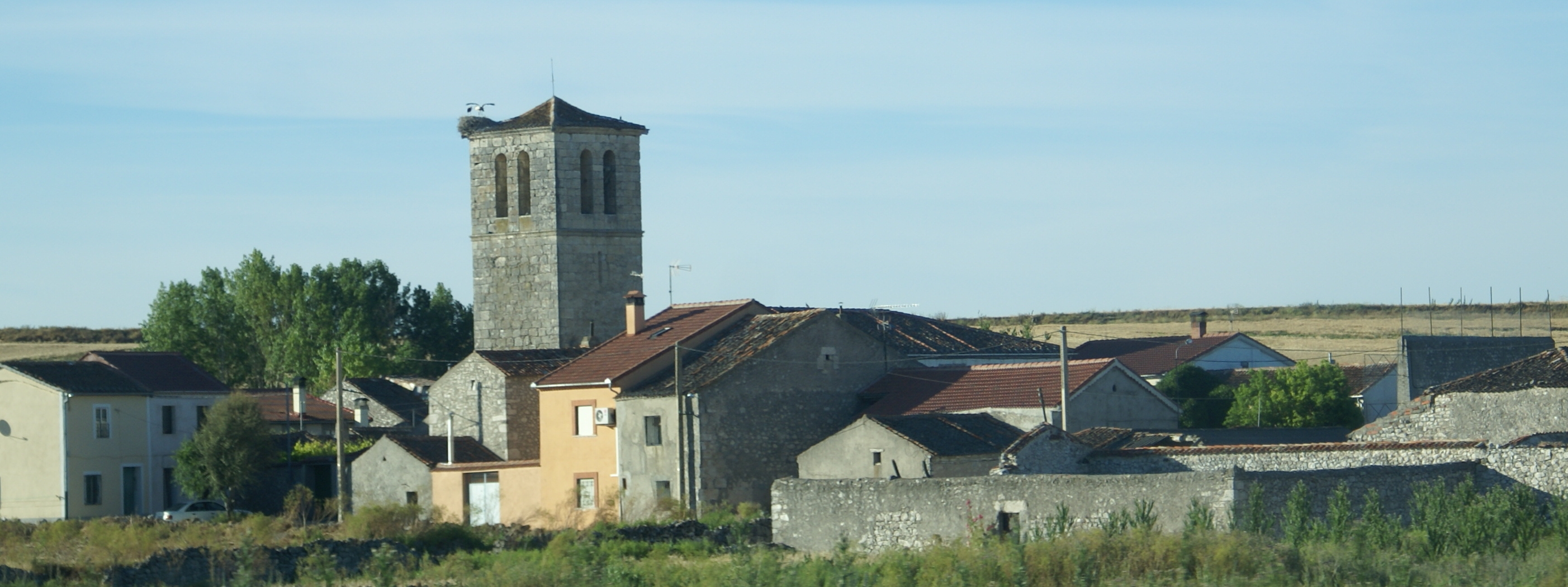
- View of Perosillo.

- Location in Spain. Perosillo (Spain)
- Coordinates: 41°23′34″N 4°08′30″W
- Country: Spain
- Autonomous community: Castile and León
- Province: Segovia
- Municipality: Perosillo

Area
  - Total: 11 km^{2} (4.2 sq mi)

Population (2025-01-01)
  - Total: 21
  - Density: 1.9/km^{2} (4.9/sq mi)
- Time zone: UTC+1 (CET)
  - Summer (DST): UTC+2 (CEST)
- Website: Official website

Perosillo is a municipality located in the province of Segovia, Castile and León, Spain. According to the 2004 census (INE), the municipality has a population of 26 inhabitants.
