= Cega (river) =

River in Spain

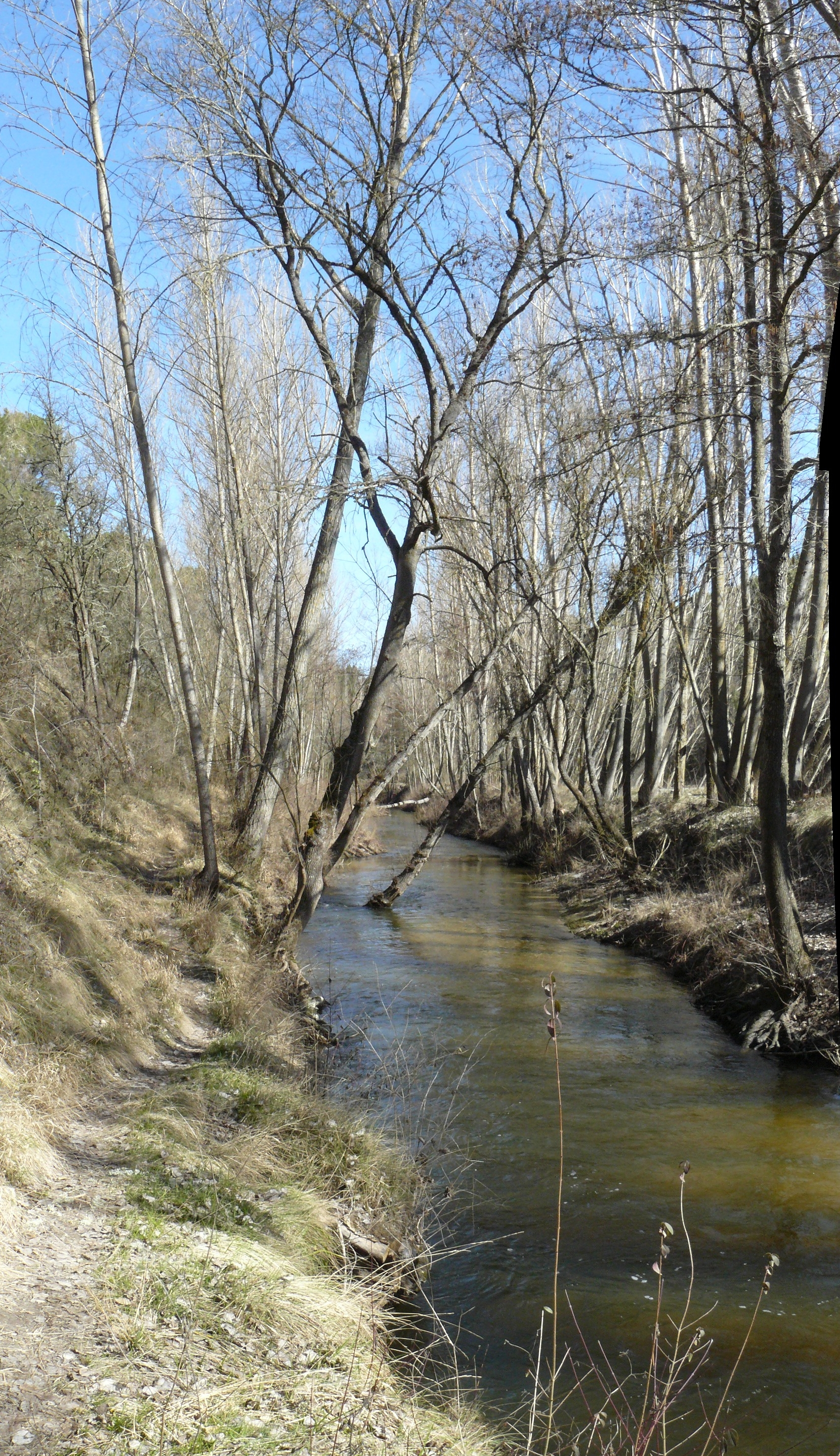

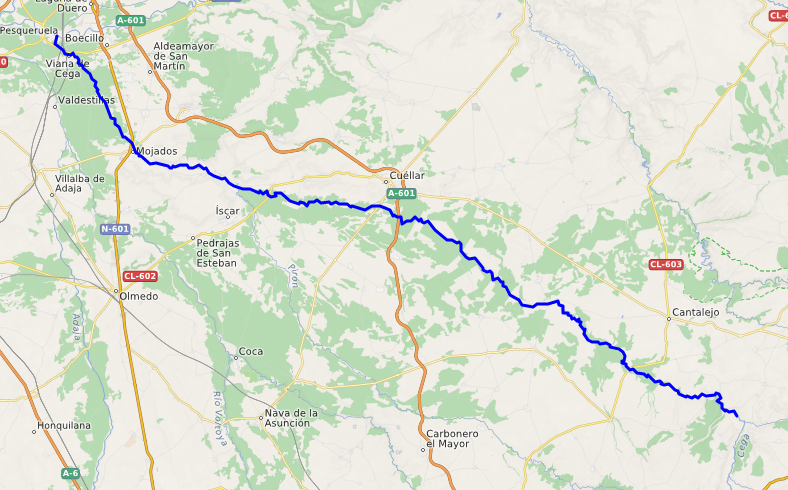

Location
- Country: Spain

Physical characteristics
- Source: Sierra de Guadarrama
  - location: Province of Segovia
  - coordinates: 41°0′55″N 3°51′4″W
- Mouth: Douro
  - location: Province of Valladolid
  - coordinates: 41°32′57″N 4°46′3″W
- Length: 133 km (83 mi)

Basin features
- Progression: Douro→ Atlantic Ocean
- River system: Douro
- Tributaries
  - left: Pirón

The Cega is a river in the Iberian Peninsula a left-bank tributary of the Douro.

It is born out of the confluence of the Artiñuelo and the Vueltas creeks in the Sierra de Guadarrama. 133 km-long, the Cega, running northwest through the province of Segovia, empties in the Douro in the province of Valladolid, having previously received the waters of the Pirón, its main left-bank tributary.
