= Fuentesaúco de Fuentidueña =

- Municipality
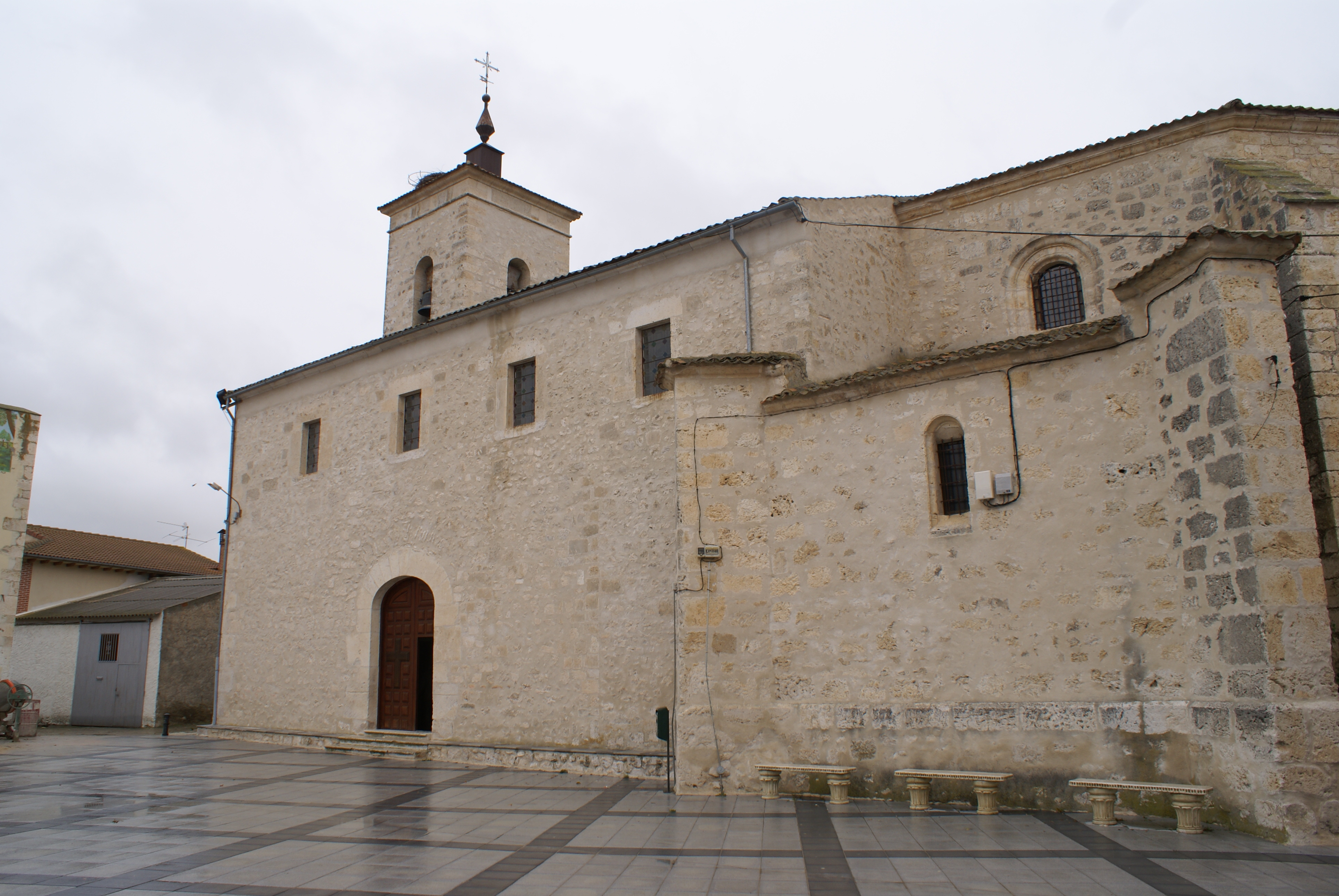
- Church of Santo Domingo de Silos

- Flag Coat of arms

- Location in Spain. Fuentesaúco de Fuentidueña (Spain)
- Coordinates: 41°25′28″N 4°03′45″W
- Country: Spain
- Autonomous community: Castile and León
- Province: Segovia
- Municipality: Fuentesaúco de Fuentidueña

Area
  - Total: 25 km^{2} (9.7 sq mi)

Population (2025-01-01)
  - Total: 216
  - Density: 8.6/km^{2} (22/sq mi)
- Time zone: UTC+1 (CET)
  - Summer (DST): UTC+2 (CEST)
- Website: Official website

Fuentesaúco de Fuentidueña is a municipality located in the province of Segovia, Castile and León, Spain. According to the 2004 census (INE), the municipality has a population of 310 inhabitants.
