= Laguna de Duero =

- Flag Coat of arms

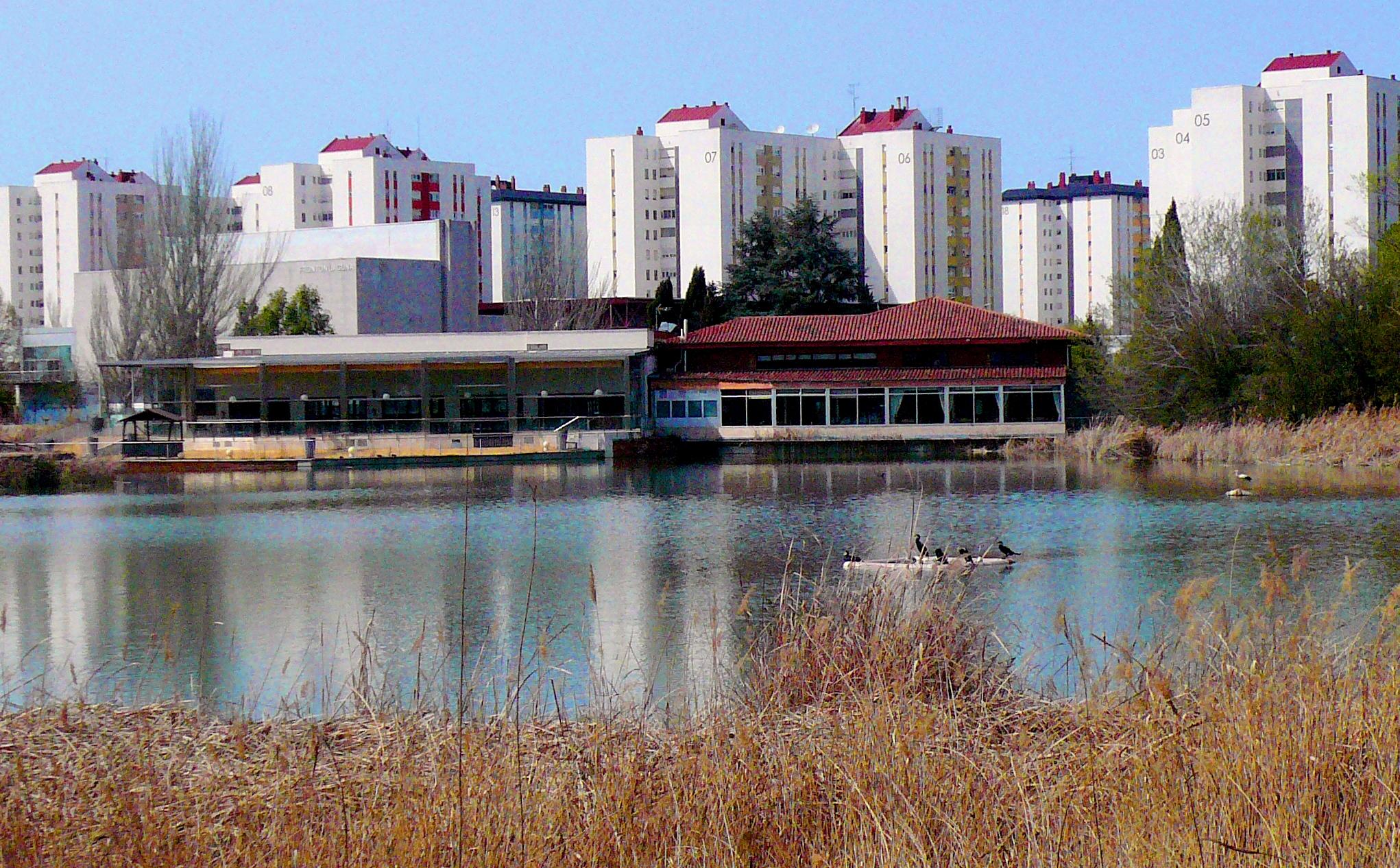

- Location of Laguna de Duero Laguna de Duero (Spain)
- Country: Spain
- Autonomous community: Castile and León
- Province: Valladolid
- Municipality: Laguna de Duero

Government
  - Alcalde (2015- ): Román Rodríguez de Castro (Independientes)

Area
  - Total: 29.23 km^{2} (11.29 sq mi)

Population (2025-01-01)
  - Total: 22,965
  - Density: 785.7/km^{2} (2,035/sq mi)
- Time zone: UTC+1 (CET)
  - Summer (DST): UTC+2 (CEST)
- Postal code: 47140

Laguna de Duero is a municipality located in the province of Valladolid, Castile and León, Spain. According to the 2016 census (INE), the municipality has a population of 22 ,696 inhabitants.

It is the second largest city in Valladolid behind Valladolid City.

Nowadays it is an industrial town situated 7 km away from the capital city of Valladolid. The town has some neighbourhoods distant from the town center like Torrelago or El Villar. The town has three industrial estates, for example, those of Las Lobas or Los Barreros.

The town is surrounded by pine woods and its municipal territory is bathed by the River Douro. What gives a privileged situation to this town, because this made the town into a place rich in wellsprings. However many of them fell into disuse or are abandoned at present. The most important is the Fountain of San Pedro Regalado at the place of El Abrojo.

== Toponym ==
The name of the town derives from the former enormous salt lagoon which existed in this town. Nowadays only a small portion of it remains in a recently remodelled beautiful environment converted into a park

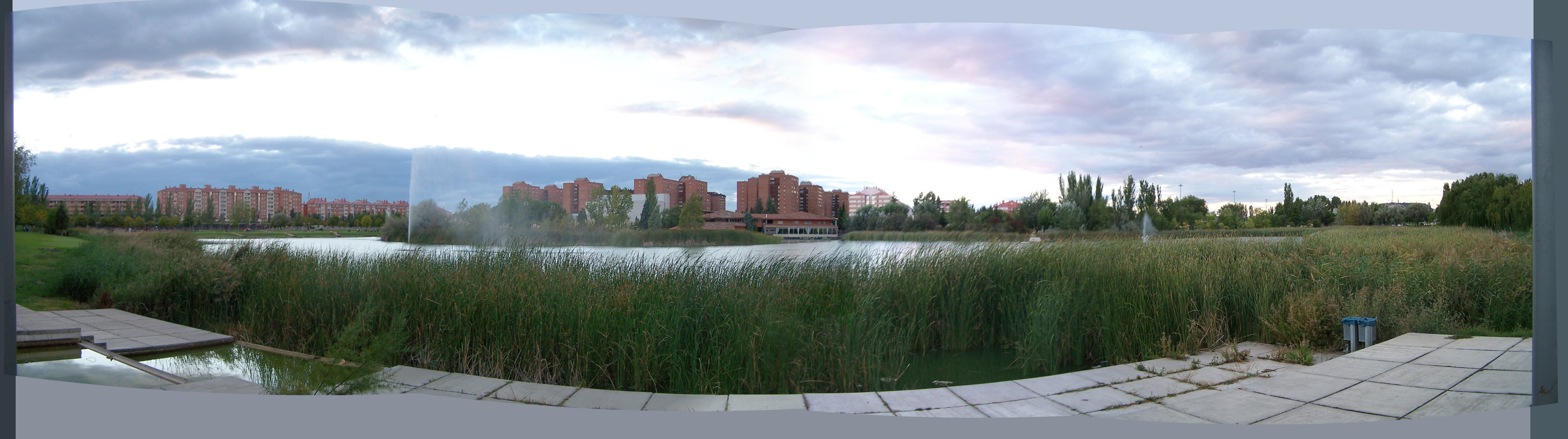
Panoramic view of the lake

== Geography ==
=== Climate ===
Laguna de Duero enjoys a Mediterranean continental climate, which is distinct from the Mediterranean sea climate because of the inexistent thermo-regulatory influence from the sea. As a matter of fact, the climate changes are more drastic because of the isolation of the region, which is surrounded by three mountain ranges, and a higher altitude over the sea level. Winters are cold with temperatures below 0 °C being present from November to April, and sometimes May and October. Summers are warm and dry, with day temperatures usually reaching 30 °C, but the nights are cool mainly because the altitude. Spring and autumn are the rainiest seasons

Climate data for Laguna de Duero, normals 1981-2010, 710 m (2,330 ft) altitude
Month	Jan	Feb	Mar	Apr	May	Jun	Jul	Aug	Sep	Oct	Nov	Dec	Year
Mean daily maximum °C (°F)	8.2 (46.8)	11.1 (52.0)	15.1 (59.2)	16.6 (61.9)	21.1 (70.0)	26.8 (80.2)	30.7 (87.3)	30.1 (86.2)	25.7 (78.3)	19.0 (66.2)	12.3 (54.1)	8.6 (47.5)	18.8 (65.8)
Daily mean °C (°F)	4.0 (39.2)	5.6 (42.1)	8.6 (47.5)	10.3 (50.5)	14.2 (57.6)	19.0 (66.2)	21.9 (71.4)	21.6 (70.9)	18.0 (64.4)	12.9 (55.2)	7.6 (45.7)	4.7 (40.5)	12.4 (54.3)
Mean daily minimum °C (°F)	−0.2 (31.6)	0.1 (32.2)	2.1 (35.8)	4.0 (39.2)	7.3 (45.1)	11.2 (52.2)	13.1 (55.6)	13.1 (55.6)	10.3 (50.5)	6.8 (44.2)	2.9 (37.2)	0.8 (33.4)	6.0 (42.8)
Average precipitation mm (inches)	33 (1.3)	24 (0.9)	19 (0.7)	40 (1.6)	48 (1.9)	27 (1.1)	11 (0.4)	15 (0.6)	27 (1.1)	49 (1.9)	46 (1.8)	44 (1.7)	393 (15.5)
Source: Atlas Agroclimático Castilla y León

== Nature ==
=== The Douro's Canal ===
The Douro's canal was constructed in order to supply water to the City of Valladolid during the 19th century by José María de Salamanca y Mayol in 1879. At present, it is a beautiful natural space and is notable for the large number of birds flying over.

The panoramic picture shows the current state of the remaining lagoon, which is a minimal part of the former salt lagoon that existed as late as 1972.

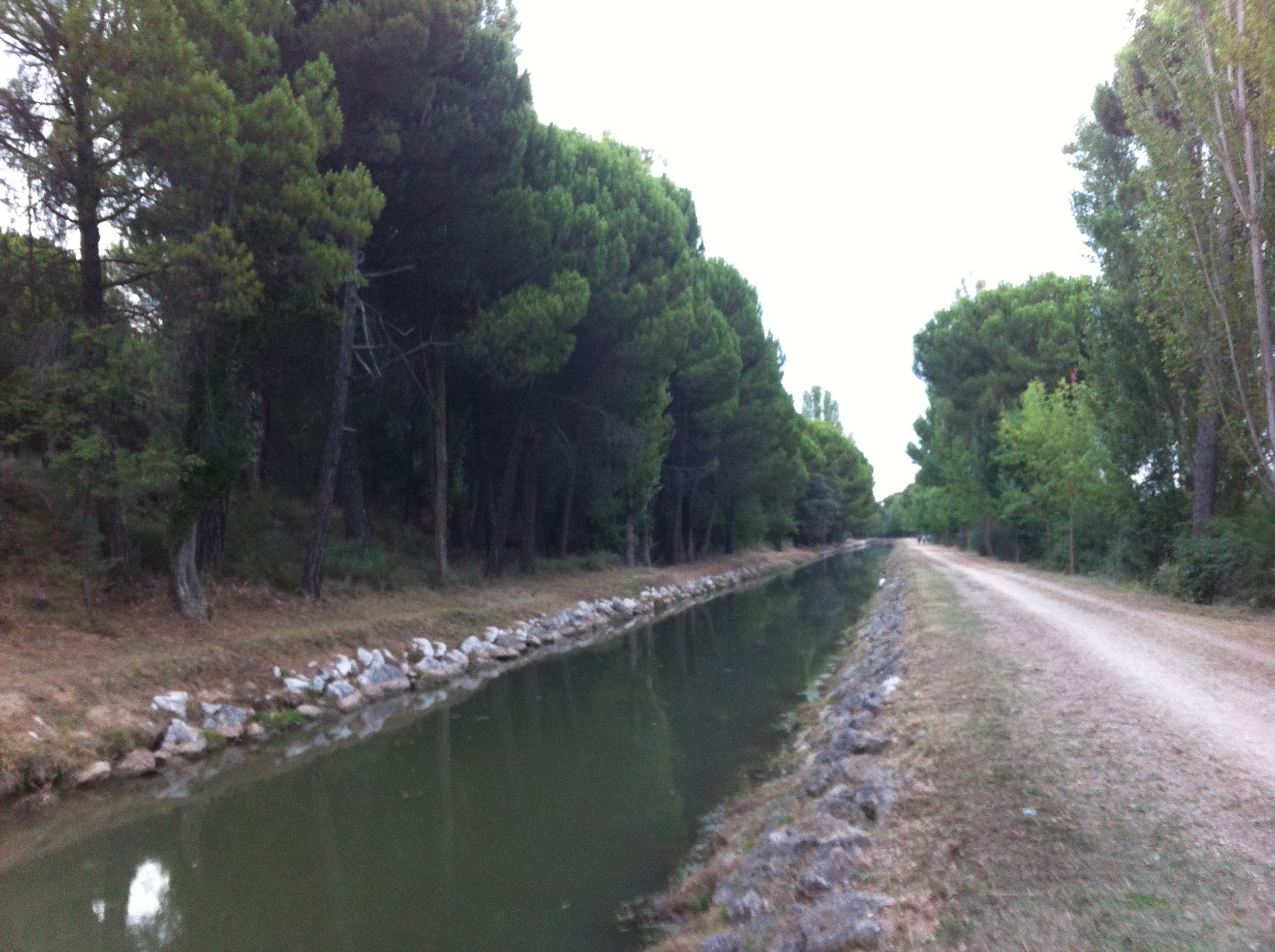
The Douro's Canal

== Demography ==
Foreign population by nationality
Country	Population
Bulgaria	200
Romania	129
Brazil	122
Portugal	72
France	62
Colombia	52

Laguna de Duero experienced a substantial population growth in the early years of the twentyfirst century. Four percent of the population are immigrants, a lower proportion than the provincial average of about 5.6%.

== Politics ==
=== Town council ===
Political distribution of the Town Council after the municipal election of 2023:

Laguna de Duero's political parties represented at the Town Council
Political party	Councillors
Partido Popular (PP)	6
Partido Socialista Obrero Español (PSCL/PSOE)	6
Independientes por Laguna	3
Toma la Palabra	2
Vox	2
Por Laguna de Duero	2

== Heritage ==
=== Church of Nuestra Señora de la Asunción ===
The first church appears cited in the archives of the Cathedral of Valladolid and was donated in 1135 by Ermengol VI, count of Urgel, who was the count Pedro Ansúrez's grandson.

Francisco de Mendoza commands to have the church demolished in 1543 and builds up a new church above the latter's remains. The current church is a Gothic-style building with three cross-vaulted naves. Much of the church is constructed in stone, possibly from the quarry of Campaspero. The belfry tower stands as high as the church's transept and its back part is made of brick. The church floor is made of white marble.

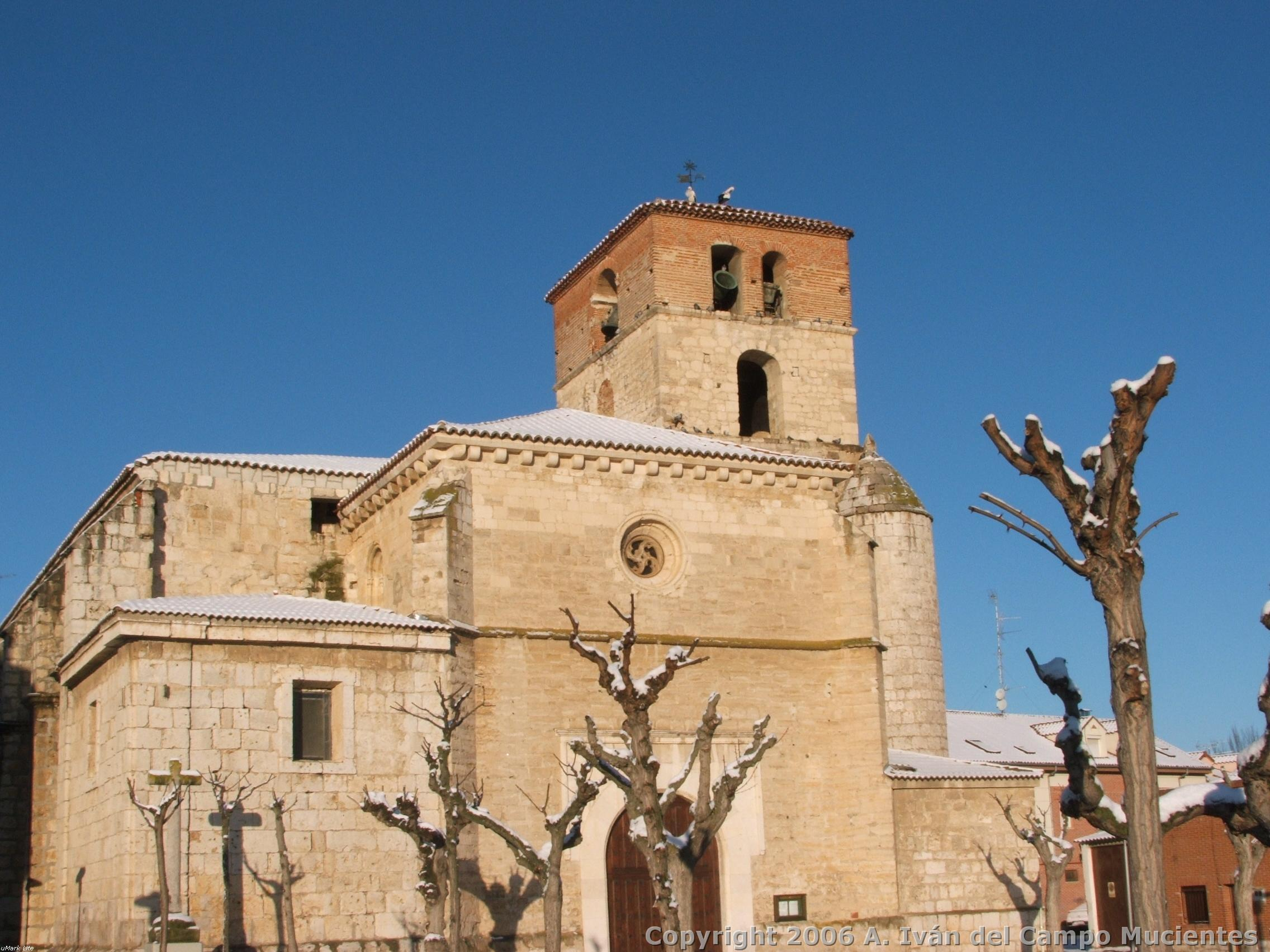
Church of Nuestra Señora de la Asunción

=== Nuestra Señora del Villar's Chapel ===
It is the only remaining chapel of the town, because there were some more in the past. It dates back to the 12th century and is located on a small hill within one km to the west of the town center.

The oldest part of the current temple is the chapelhead, which is square-floored and finished with a semi-polygonal plastered wall and with a star-shaped groin vault; this part was built in the 16th century. There are some paintings telling some legends and miracles related to the holy Virgin on the top of the Main chapel's walls.

Later in the 17th century, the chapel was enlarged by building a new rectangular-floor nave covered with a barrel vault. The façade is a round arch protected by a rectangular portico formed by four columns holding the wooden roof. The sacristy leans against the left side of the main chapel and the alcove stands behind the presbytery, where the votive offerings are stocked. These latter parts of the chapel are the most recent and were built in the 18th century.

The altarpiece is baroque style and is made of only one body with four solomonic columns decorated with grape bunches and leaves. At the center stands the alcove with a statue of the Virgin Our Lady of the Villar, and on the top of the altarpiece is a painting depicting the coronation of the Virgin. The statue is a 13th-century polychromed wooden sculpture. The Virgin holds the Baby Jesus with her left kneel, both sculptures being in an inexpressive position. The sculpture was maimed several times in order to dress it with a cape. In 1986, the sculpture was restored.

On September 8, the town feasts the Virgin's Nativity with a solemn mass, flower offerings, and a traditional auction for the people to be able to bring the Virgin down the throne and parade with her in a procession around the chapel with people dancing traditional dancings at the rhythm of the Castilian traditional musical instruments like the dulzainas(a kind of Spanish double-reed instrument), the bagpipes, and the drums.

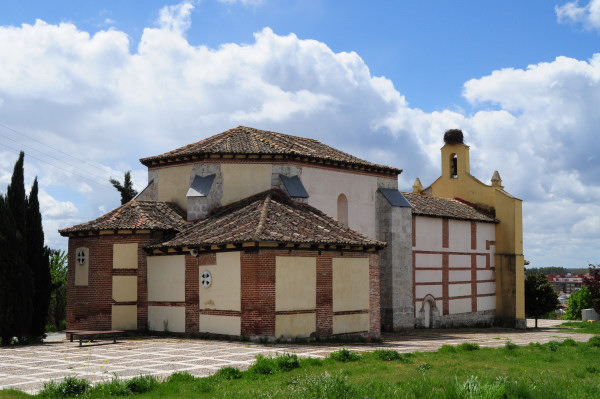
Chapel of Nuestra Señora del Villar

=== Church of San Pedro Regalado ===
It is a modern church composed of a central nave and two other lateral ones. A Christ sculpture is found inside the church and which is paraded together with the Santo Cristo de los Trabajos (The holy Christ of the Works) and Nuestro Padre Jesús Nazareno (Our Father Jesus the Nazarene) in the procession of the Silence on Good Thursday.

=== Culture House ===
The Culture House is an early 20th-century building used as a public library since it was bought by the Town Council in 1986. Commonly called "The Hotel", the building is a two-storey structure in red brick, finished with a white stone balustrade on the flat roof.

=== The Constitution Scultpture ===
It was erected in 1982 and is situated at the Constitution Square. Its author is the sculptor José Noja, its name is two entwined hands.

== Festivities ==
The most outstanding festivities are Las Águedas Day, San Pedro Regalado's Day, La Vieja's Day and the Patron Saint's festivities.

The Las Águedas Day is celebrated on February 5 in hommage to St Agatha of Sicily.

San Pedro Regalado's Day is celebrated in May.

The celebration of this day has been being celebrated from the ancient times and is very dug in the town. Nobody knows its origin, since there are many theories explaining its true origin. The most accurate theory is that the mule drivers, who covered the route from the capital city of the kingdom to the northern lands, passed the night alongside the cattle on a place known as Prado Boyal (literally the oxen meadow)

The celebration of this festivity coincides with the Lent.

La Vieja was depicted by a figure of an old woman made of carton or wood that had seven legs, each for each Lent week. Each leg was sawed insofar as each week went by. This seven-week period of time must have been too long for the mule drivers, because the Lent involved abstinence and fasting; for this reason they decided to celebrate in the middle of the Lent period. The cattle breeders celebrated this festivity, when they had a rest in Laguna de Duero at the place of Prado Boyal. The inhabitants of Laguna de Duero are supposed to have been passed down this tradition and made this festivity their own. The festivity is celebrated on Wednesday in the middle of the Lent.

Traditionally, the children did not go to school and used to go with a basket resquesting food from a house to another in order to go to have lunch in the afternoon at the pine woods of Los Valles or Guarnicionera. In these times, the most valued contributions were potatoes, eggs and chorizos to make the classic Spanish chorizo omelette.

The Patron Saint festivities are celebrated from September 7 to 11 and are in hommage to Holy Virgin of El Villar. They start off with a speech and as from that moment on the peñistas (member of neighbours associations dedicated to making arrangement for these revelries) go to the chapel of Nuestra Señora del Villar to make flower offerings to the Holy Virgin. The main feast day is September 8, the Patron Saint's Day.

== Education ==
Laguna de Duero houses the French school of Valladolid, Lycée Français de Castilla y León.

== Gastronomy ==
- Cuisine of the province of Valladolid

=== Sport ===
The most remarkable sport team in Laguna de Duero is its football team, the Club Deportivo Laguna that owns an important history of triumphs in the province of Valladolid. Their most important triumphs are the third division Spanish Football Championship, and the Trophy Deputation of Valladolid. They play their matches at the stadium La Laguna with a capacity of 3,500 people.

The Club de Pelota de Laguna de Duero, in frontenis (a sport similar to jaialai), achieved several regional and national titles. The members of the Spanish junior male selection of frontenis under the age of 17 years, who achieved the gold medal in the Spanish national championship, come from Laguna de Duero.

There is also a five a side football or indoor soccer school called CD Laguna FS V.V. with a farm team formed by diverse teams for under 10s, under 11s, under 13s and cadets, in addition to a senior team in provincial category and another senior in national category B. These teams play their matches at the sport centers of Laguna de Duero: The municipal sport center with a capacity of 400 people and the sport center La Nava.

There is a handball team too: Balonmano Laguna.

== Bibliography ==
- MARTÍN GONZÁLEZ, Juan José. Catálogo Monumental. Antiguo Partido Judicial de Valladolid, tomo VI. Diputación Provincial de Valladolid. Reedición año 2000.
- CASTELLANOS CUESTA, Margarita. Ermita de Nuestra Señora del Villar Laguna de Duero. Diputación Provincial de Valladolid, año 2012.
