= Sexmo =

Type of administrative division of the Crown of Castile

The sexmo or sexma (transl. 'sixth part') was an administrative subdivision present in parts of medieval Castile corresponding to a grouping of rural hamlets within the territorial jurisdiction of a town council. Its articulation primarily responded to the purpose of tax collection, and, insofar they served the Crown to that end, the latter provided certain formal recognition to the administrative organization. They also served to administer communal property. Associated to this division, there was the political office of sexmero, institutionalised towards the 13th century, charged with the collection of pechos.
