= Cozuelos de Fuentidueña =

- Municipality
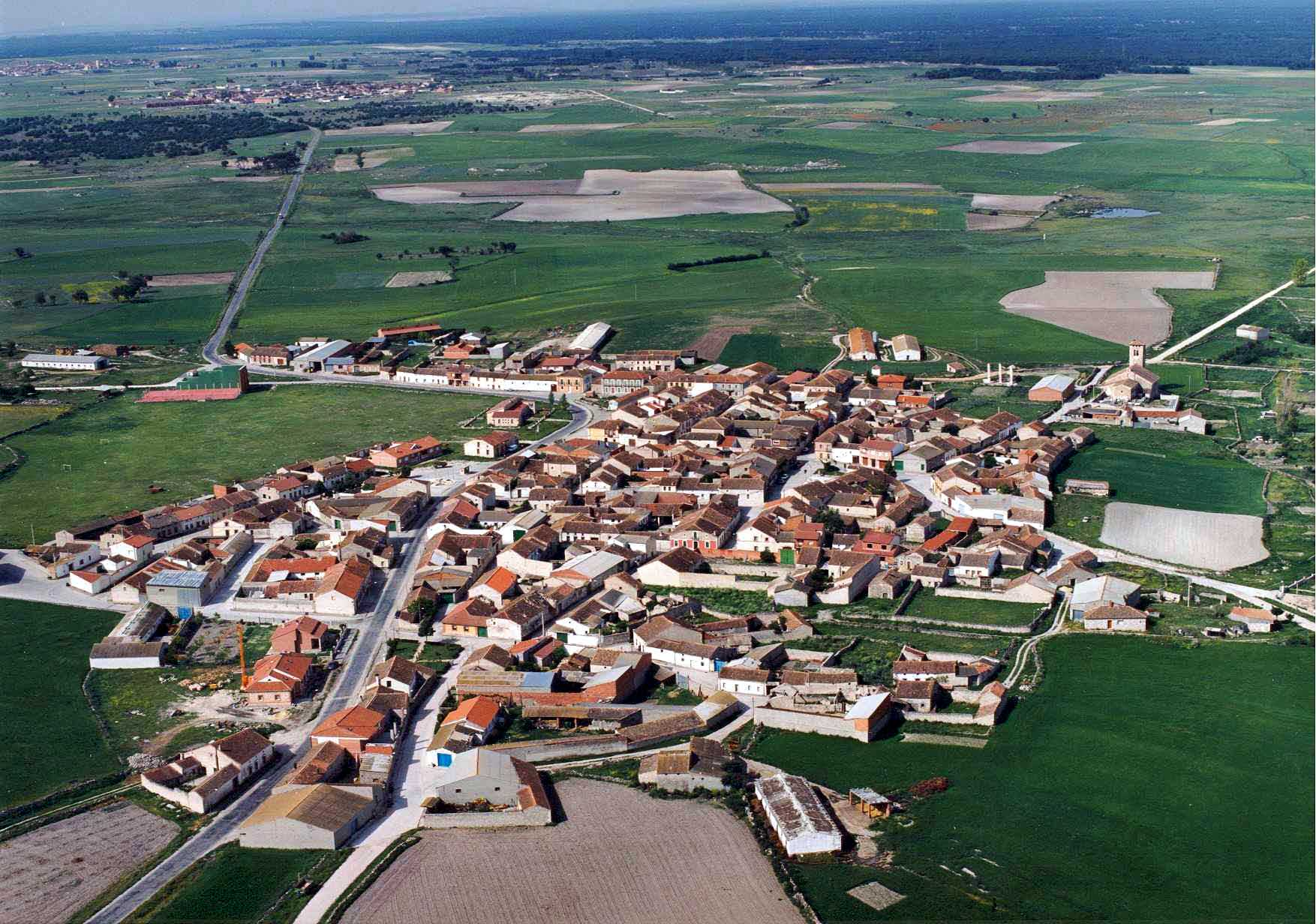

- Flag Coat of arms

- Location in Spain. Cozuelos de Fuentidueña (Spain)
- Coordinates: 41°23′29″N 4°05′44″W
- Country: Spain
- Autonomous community: Castile and León
- Province: Segovia
- Municipality: Cozuelos de Fuentidueña

Government
  - Mayor: Vicente Bayón Velasco (PP)

Area
  - Total: 15 km^{2} (5.8 sq mi)

Population (2025-01-01)
  - Total: 102
  - Density: 6.8/km^{2} (18/sq mi)
- Time zone: UTC+1 (CET)
  - Summer (DST): UTC+2 (CEST)
- Website: Official website

Cozuelos de Fuentidueña is a municipality located in the province of Segovia, Castile and León, Spain. According to the 2004 census (INE), the municipality has a population of 168 inhabitants.

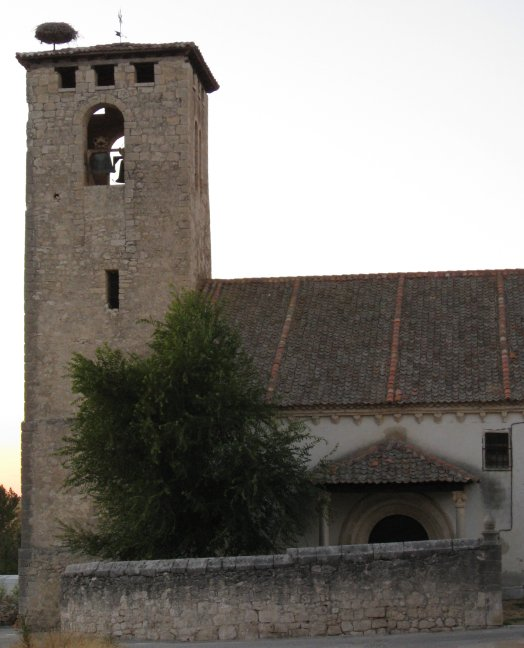
Iglesia de Nuestra Señora de la Asunción.
