= Fuentepiñel =

- Municipality
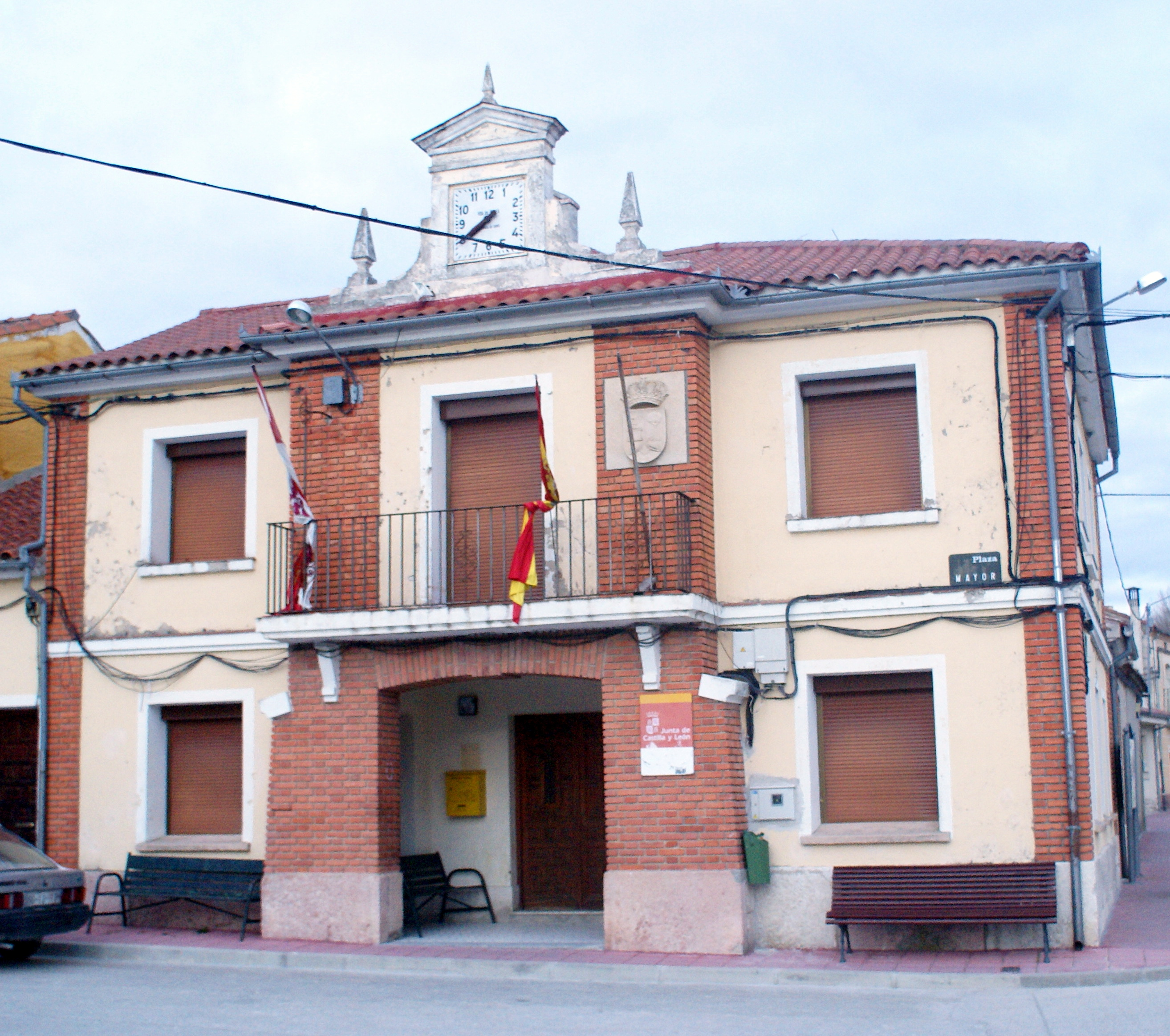
- Town hall of Fuentepiñel, Segovia, Spain.

- Flag Coat of arms

- Location in Spain. Fuentepiñel (Spain)
- Coordinates: 41°23′59″N 4°02′32″W
- Country: Spain
- Autonomous community: Castile and León
- Province: Segovia
- Municipality: Fuentepiñel

Area
  - Total: 12 km^{2} (4.6 sq mi)

Population (2025-01-01)
  - Total: 63
  - Density: 5.3/km^{2} (14/sq mi)
- Time zone: UTC+1 (CET)
  - Summer (DST): UTC+2 (CEST)
- Website: Official website

Fuentepiñel is a municipality located in the province of Segovia, Castile and León, Spain. According to the 2004 census (INE), the municipality has a population of 150 inhabitants.
