= Frumales =

Village in Segovia, Spain

Frumales Frunmales (11th century)
- Municipality
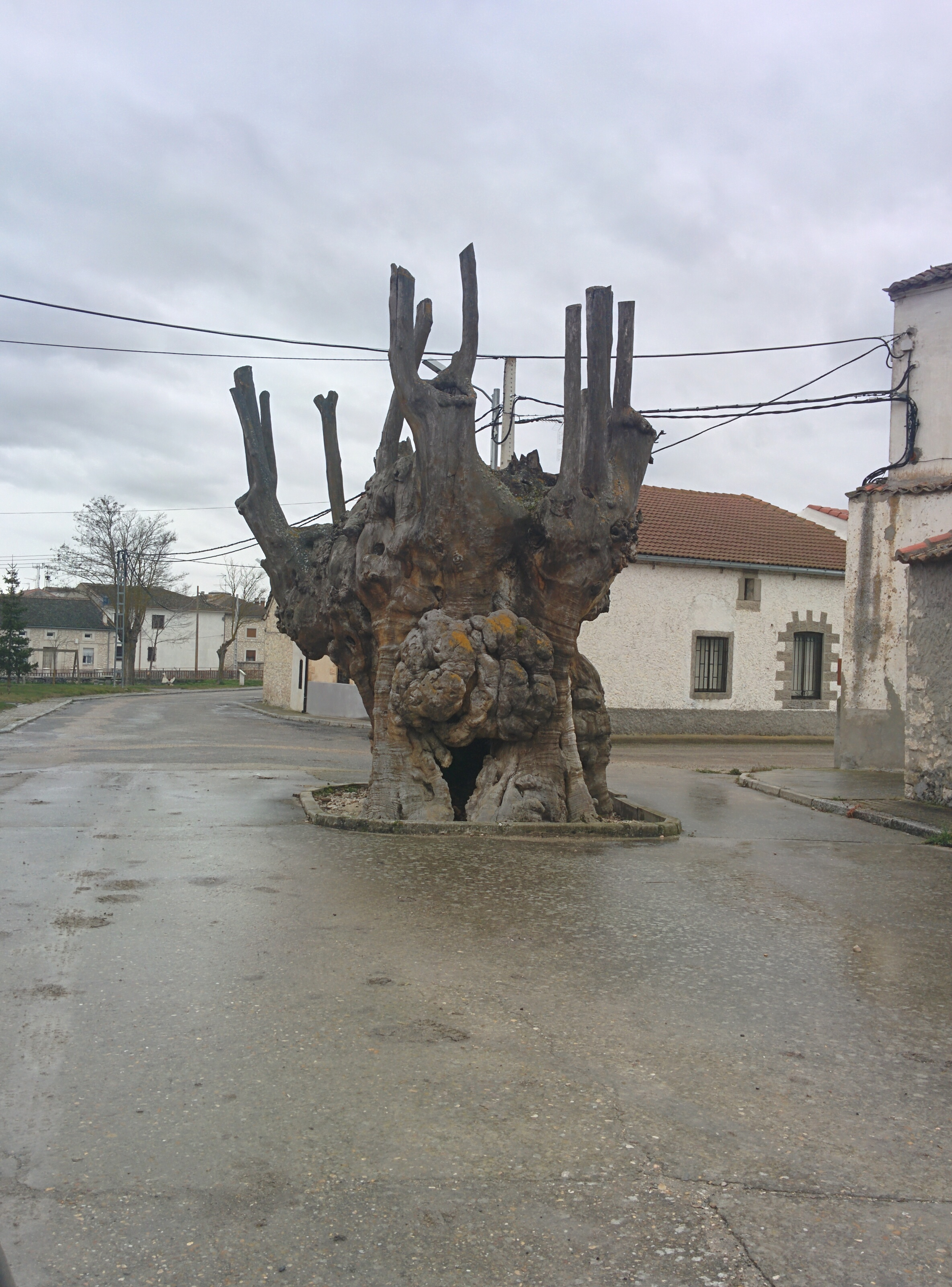
- The Giant Old Elm, a cultural symbol of Frumales

- Location in Spain. Frumales (Spain)
- Coordinates: 41°23′01″N 4°11′10″W
- Country: Spain
- Autonomous com.: Castile and Leon
- Province: Province of Segovia
- Judicial dist.: Judicial district of Cuéllar

Government
  - Mayor: Francisco J. Sanz Velasco

Area
  - Total: 28 km^{2} (11 sq mi)
- Elevation: 823 m (2,700 ft)

Population
  - Total: 130
- Postal code: 40298
- Official language(s): Spanish
- Website: Official website

Frumales is a municipality in the province of Segovia, Spain. It has a population of 130 registered residents and covers an area of 28 km². It is within the regions of the Land of Pine Groves and the Community of Town and Land of Cuéllar. The terrain is made mostly of pine forests and cultivated fields, although farming is no longer the backbone of its economy, instead being reliant on pensions and the work of neighboring towns. Its main attractions are the Cerquilla River, the Windmill of the Aldehuela, and the Giant Old Elm.

== Notable people ==
People who were born in, residents of, or otherwise closely associated with Frumales include:

- Luis Minguela (born 1960), international footballer
