= Convento de la Purísima Concepción (Cuéllar) =

16th-century Franciscan convent in Cuéllar, Spain

Coordinates: 41°24′04″N 4°18′38″E

Convent of the Immaculate Conception
- Convento de la Purísima Concepción
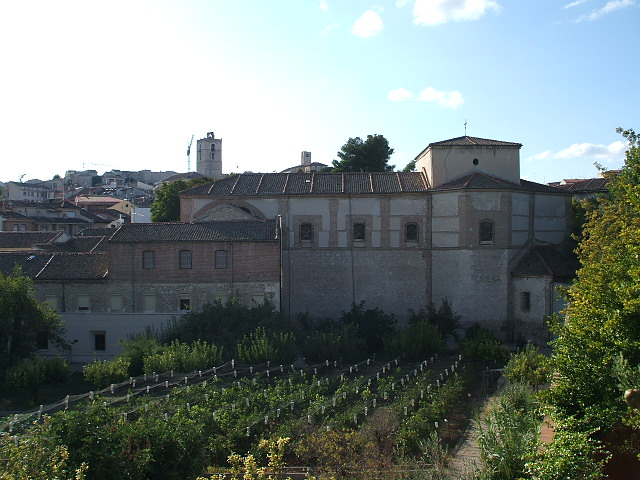

Religion
- Affiliation: Franciscan Conceptionists. Diocese of Segovia Catholic Church
- Ecclesiastical or organisational status: Convent
- Status: Active

Location
- Location: Cuéllar, Province of Segovia, Castilla y León, Spain
- Interactive map of Convent of the Immaculate Conception

Architecture
- Architect: Simón Martínez (1736 church)
- Style: Renaissance, Baroque
- Founder: Melchor de Rojas and Constanza Becerra
- Groundbreaking: 1582
- Completed: 1587 (original); 1739 (current church)

The Convent of the Immaculate Conception is a religious building in Spain. Located in the town of Cuéllar, it is situated near the Paseo de San Francisco, at the entrance to the town from the Peñafiel road. It is a cloistered convent of nuns belonging to the Order of the Immaculate Conception, founded in the 16th century by Melchor de Rojas y Velázquez and his wife, Constanza Becerra, members of the minor nobility of Cuéllar.

The building is in the Renaissance style, and its foundation reflects the devotion and ostentation characteristic of the Castilian nobility during the Middle Ages, following the same principles as most religious institutions established in this period. Together with the convents of San Francisco and Santa Ana, it forms a religious triangle due to their geographic proximity, and it is part of Cuéllar's extensive religious complex, which includes six monasteries and over a dozen parishes. The convent currently holds weekly services and houses works by the sculptor Pedro de Bolduque, as well as an image attributed to the school of Gregorio Fernández.

== History ==
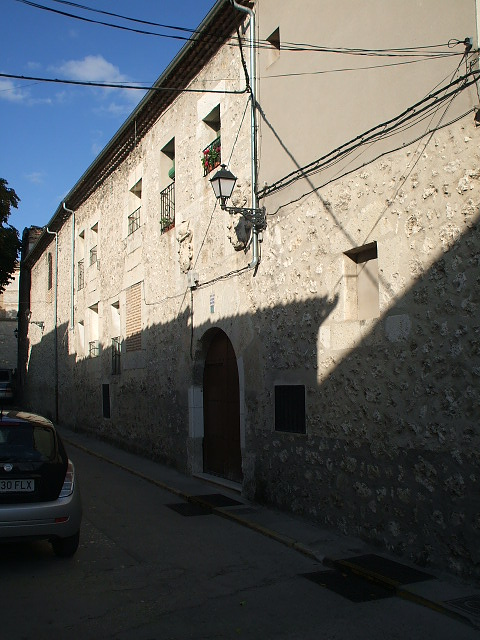
Main entrance and facade

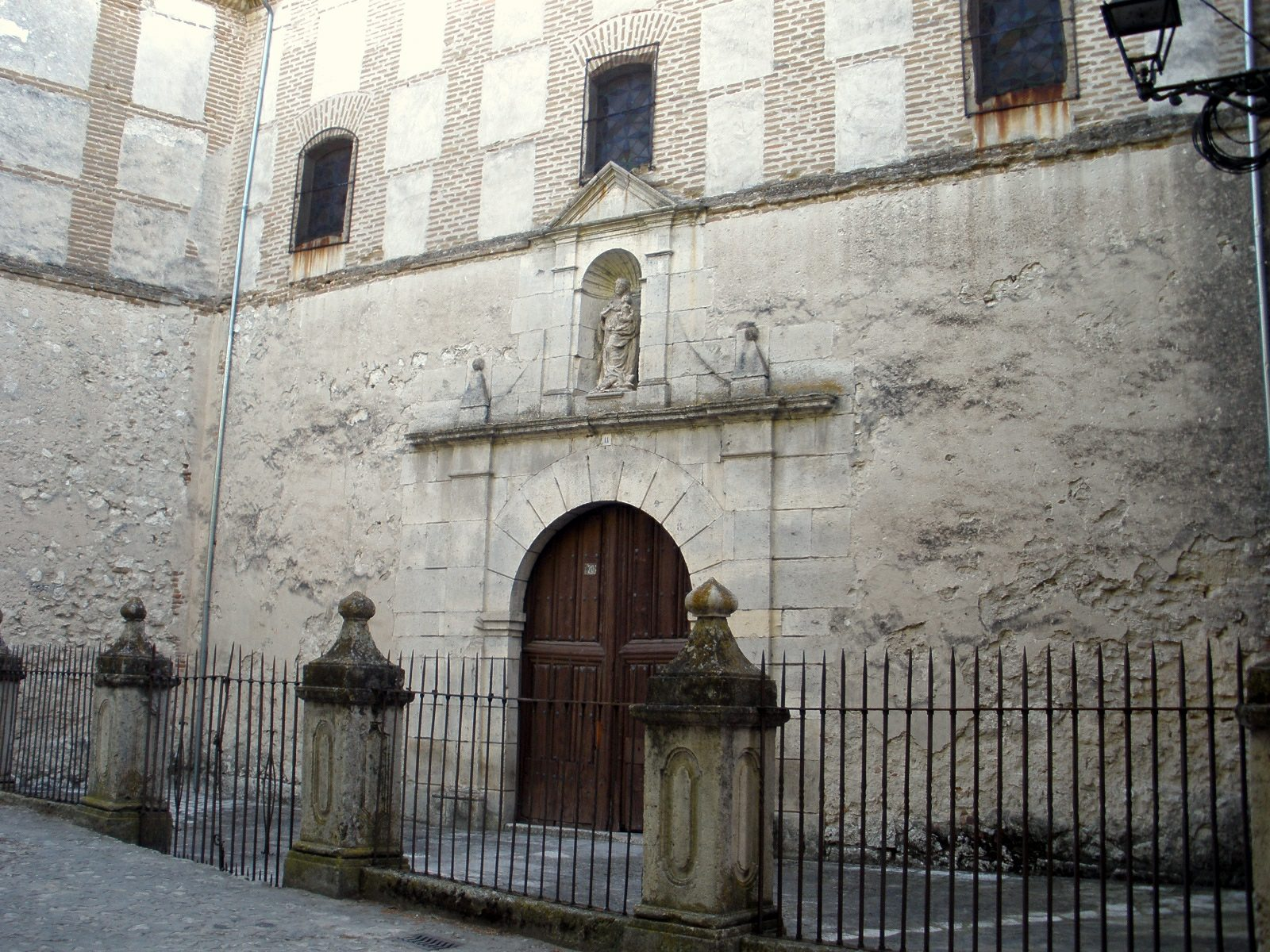
Lateral entrance

The foundation of the convent was initiated by the pious couple Melchor de Rojas y Velázquez and his third wife, Constanza Becerra.

The process began in 1582, when the couple approached the Provincial of the Franciscan Province of the Immaculate Conception with their proposal to establish a cloistered convent in their family home in Cuéllar. They outlined the conditions they wished to be accepted, including their daughters' desire to join the religious order. The Provincial accepted the monastery under his authority and generally agreed to the proposed conditions. The admission patent was issued on June 7, 1582.

Construction of the church and convent began that same year and was completed in 1587. The first Mass was celebrated on June 4, 1587, officiated by the guardian of the Convent of San Francisco in Valladolid, attended by the vicar of Cuéllar's clergy, the religious of San Francisco in Cuéllar, the Dukes of Alburquerque, and much of the local population.

Regular religious life began on October 21, 1593. The founding nuns included Ana de Reinosa as abbess, Inés Huidobro as vicar, and María de Villanueva and María de Castejón, all from the community of Berlanga de Duero. On the same day, four daughters of the founders—María, Catalina, Juana, and Isabel—took the habit. In the 17th century, a daughter of the Dukes of Alburquerque joined the congregation.

Regarding the number of nuns, records are inconsistent. In 1751, the community comprised 18 nuns; by 1786, only 8 remained; in 1850, the number dropped to 5, but by 1900, it had risen to 19, the same number recorded in 1975.

Like other convents in Cuéllar, the political upheavals of the second half of the 19th century affected the monastery. On November 21, 1868, the provincial governor ordered the nuns to temporarily relocate to the convent in Ayllón. Following repeated requests from Cuéllar's town council and residents—given the convent's church was one of the most attended for Mass—the governor agreed to suppress the Monastery of Santa Clara, and its nuns temporarily joined those at the Convent of the Immaculate Conception. By November 1870, all nuns resided together in the same location.

This community has been one of Cuéllar's largest, and except for occasional disruptions (mainly floods), the convent has never been abandoned and remains active today.

=== Founder ===
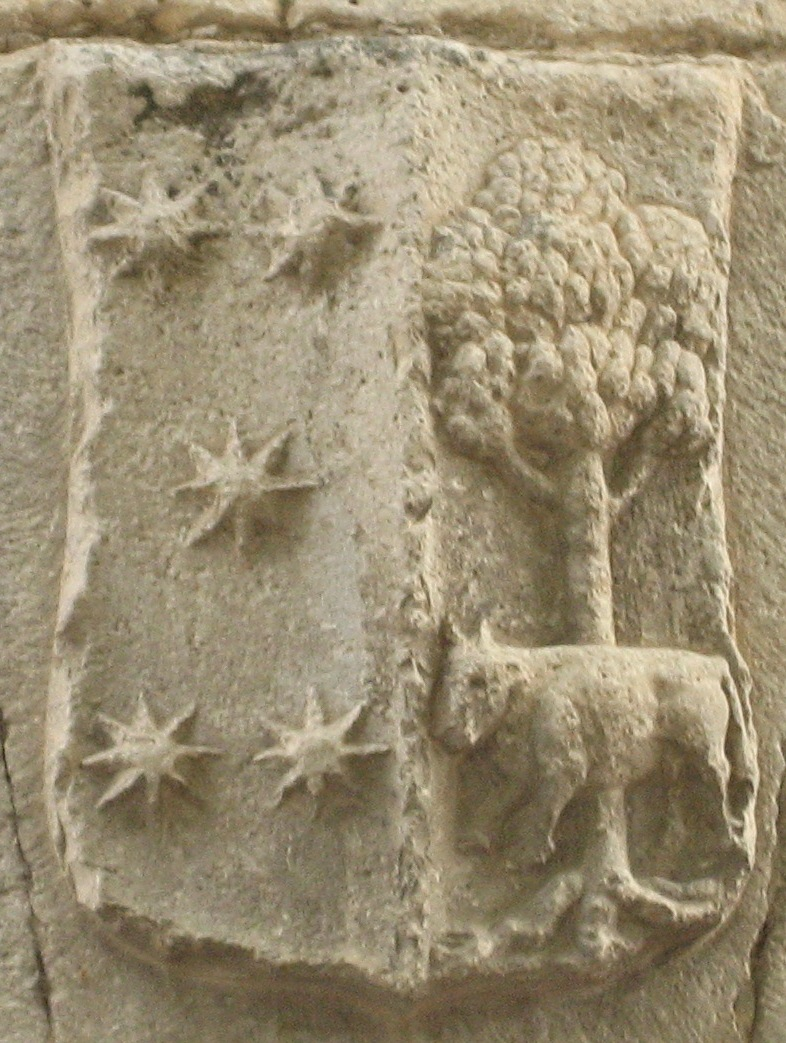
Coat of arms of the founders.

Don Melchor belonged to one of Cuéllar's most distinguished families, the Rojas. Born in the town in the late 15th century, he came from a family of conquistadors in the Americas. He traveled with them to the newly discovered territories by Columbus, spending over a decade there before returning to his hometown.

Don Melchor was the son of the conquistador Manuel de Rojas y Córdova, one of the first settlers and conquerors of Cuba and Jamaica, governor of Cuba (1524–25 and 1532–34), and a servant of the Royal House. His mother, María Magdalena Velázquez, belonged to Cuéllar's preeminent noble family, the Velázquez, whose ancestral home was the Palace of Peter I. She was also from a conquistador family, being a niece of the Adelantado and first governor of Cuba, Diego Velázquez de Cuéllar. Don Melchor was also a nephew of another conquistador, Gabriel de Rojas y Córdova, captain general of the artillery in the Kingdom of Peru, and brother to other conquistadors.

=== Tombs of the founders ===
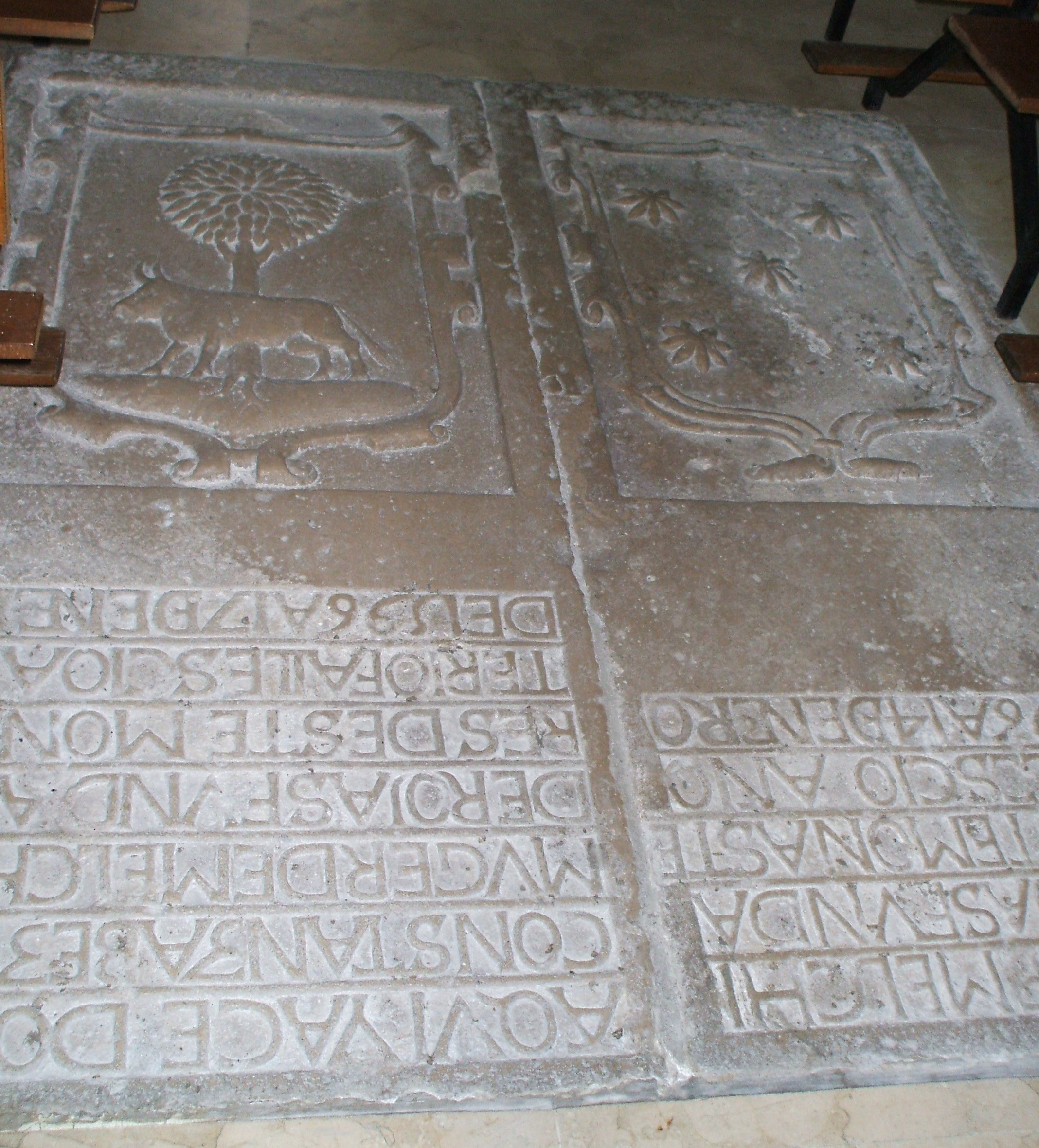
Tombs of the founders

Both spouses died three days apart: Melchor on January 14, 1596, and Constanza on January 17, 1596. Despite holding the patronage of the Rojas chapel in San Francisco, Melchor and his wife chose to be buried in their foundation, the only members of their lineage to do so; their son requested burial in the Franciscan chapel.

They were likely buried in the main chapel of the original church. When the nuns built the new church, the founders' remains were transferred to the main chapel of the new temple, where they remain today, opposite the high altar. Both tombs are made of limestone, with their respective carved coats of arms and inscriptions, preserved in excellent condition. The tomb on the Gospel side (left) belongs to Melchor, with the inscription: (Note: Original text: AQVI YACE MELCHI / OR DE ROJAS FVNDA / DOR DESTE MONASTE / RIO. FALLESCIO AÑO / DE 1596 A 14 DE ENERO.)

HERE LIES MELCHOR
DE ROJAS, FOUNDER
OF THIS MONASTERY.
DIED IN THE YEAR
1596 ON JANUARY 14.

On the Epistle side (right), next to Melchor's, is Constanza's tomb: (Note: Original text: AQVI YACE DOÑA / CONSTANZA BEZERA / MVGER DE MELCHIOR / DE ROJAS FVNDADO / RES DESTE MONAS / TERIO. FALLESCIO AÑO / DE 1596 A 17 DE ENERO.)

HERE LIES DOÑA
CONSTANZA BECERRA,
WIFE OF MELCHOR
DE ROJAS, FOUNDER
OF THIS MONASTERY.
DIED IN THE YEAR
1596 ON JANUARY 17.

== Church ==
The complex has had two churches, as the original church's location at the base of a slope led to flooding during heavy rains.

The original church, in the Gothic style and completed in 1586, was positioned transversely to the current one, occupying what is now the nuns’ private cemetery, the choir, and other dependencies. Inside the church, on the Gospel side near the low choir door, is the foundation inscription of the original church, which reads: (Note: Original text: ESTA YGLESIA Y MONASTERIO DE LA / CONCEPTION DE LA SACRATÍSSIMA Y / SIEMPRE VIRGEN MARÍA NVESTRA SEÑORA / FVNDARON Y DOTARON MELCHIOR / DE ROJAS Y DOÑA CONSTANZA BEZERRA, / SV MVGER, A GLORIA Y HONRA DE DIOS / NRO SEÑOR Y DE SV BENDITA MADRE. / AÑO DEL SEÑOR DE 1586.)

THIS CHURCH AND MONASTERY OF THE
IMMACULATE CONCEPTION OF THE MOST HOLY AND
EVER VIRGIN MARY OUR LADY
WERE FOUNDED AND ENDOWED BY MELCHOR
DE ROJAS AND DOÑA CONSTANZA BECERRA,
HIS WIFE, TO THE GLORY AND HONOR OF GOD
OUR LORD AND HIS BLESSED MOTHER.
YEAR OF OUR LORD 1586.

The original entrance's arch is still visible, now sealed, bearing the founders’ coats of arms and a central niche that once held a stone image of the Virgin.

Its location was poorly chosen, and due to its position at the base of a steep slope, it suffered significant flooding. On June 27, 1651, a severe downpour washed away parts of the mud and stone walls, flooding the convent and refectory, leading many to fear for the nuns’ safety. This and subsequent floods prompted the nuns to build a new church, oriented transversely to avoid future flooding.

Construction of the new church began in 1736, designed by Simón Martínez, a master architect from Segovia. The builder, José Morante, contracted the work for 90,000 reales of vellón, formalized on August 18, 1736.

The church consists of a single nave and a triple apse. It also features a high and low choir. Construction was completed in 1739, as indicated by a foundation stone placed opposite the original church's stone, reading: (Note: Original text: Y POR ABERSE VISTO REPETIDAS / BEZES EL CTO EN PELIGRO DE ANE / GARSE POR LA YGLESIA ANTI / GVA SE IZO ESTA TODA Y TOTAL / MENTE A COSTA DESTA COMV / NIDAD. CONCLVIOSE SV FABRI / CA EL DIA 18 DE FEBRERO AÑO / DE 1739.)

AND BECAUSE THE CONVENT WAS REPEATEDLY
AT RISK OF FLOODING DUE TO THE OLD
CHURCH, THIS ONE WAS BUILT ENTIRELY
AT THE EXPENSE OF THIS COMMUNITY.
ITS CONSTRUCTION WAS COMPLETED
ON FEBRUARY 18, 1739.

The current facade, in a classical style, features a stone image of the Virgin with Child.

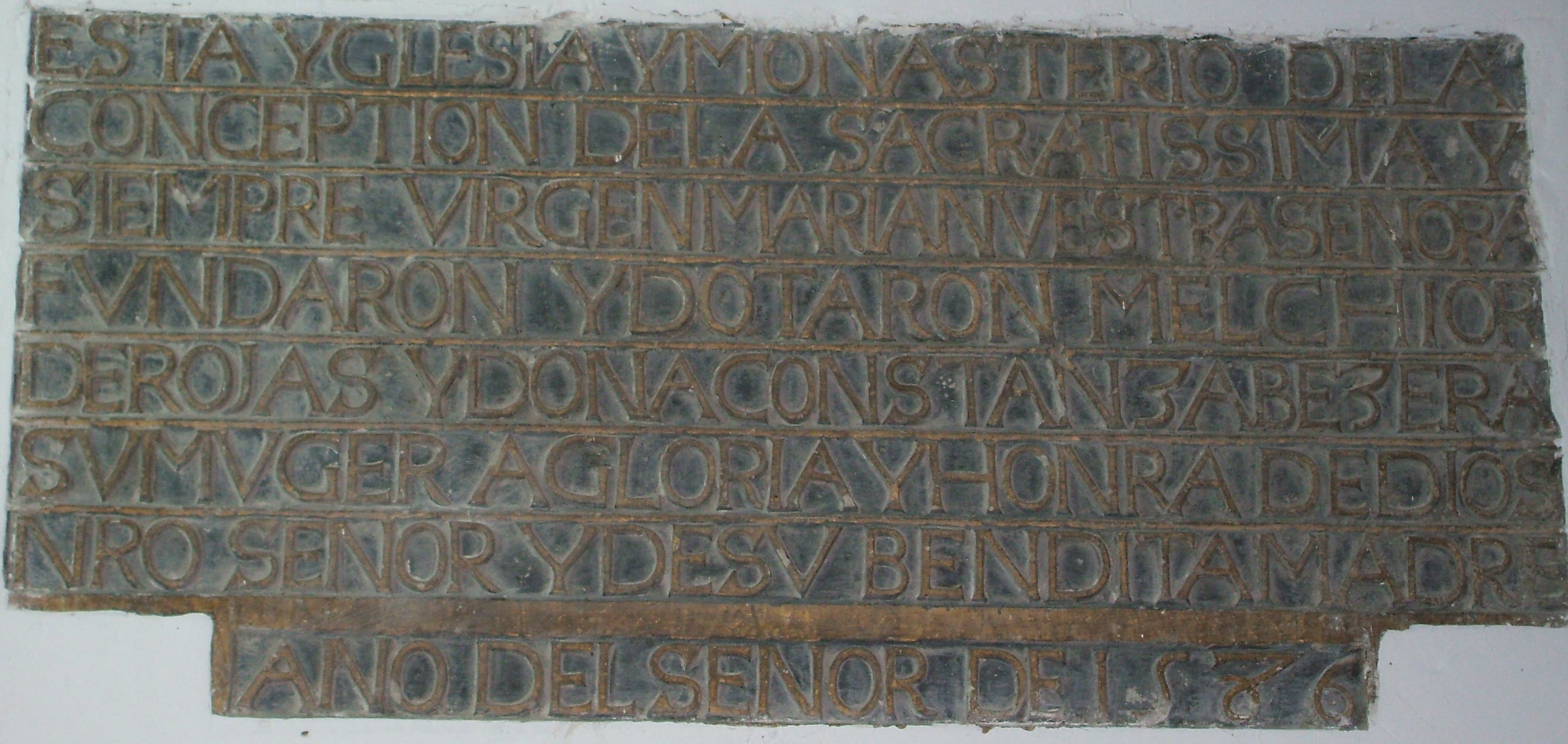
Foundation stone of the original church

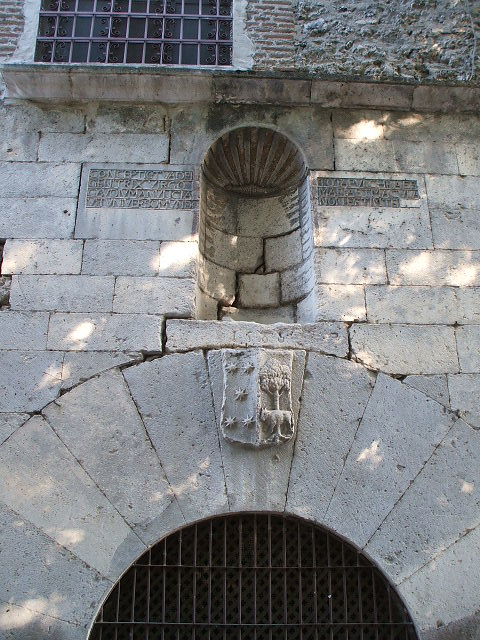
Entrance of the original church

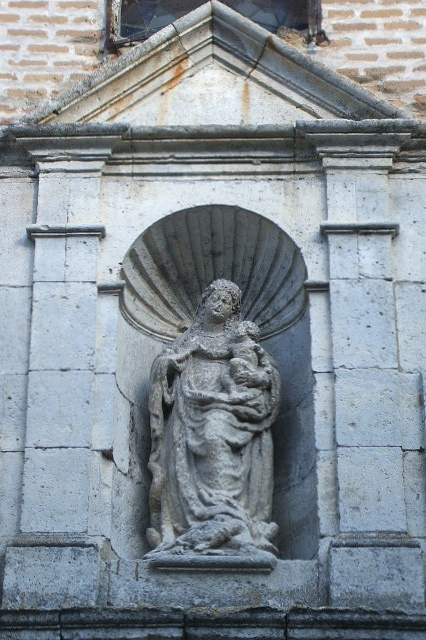
Detail of the entrance

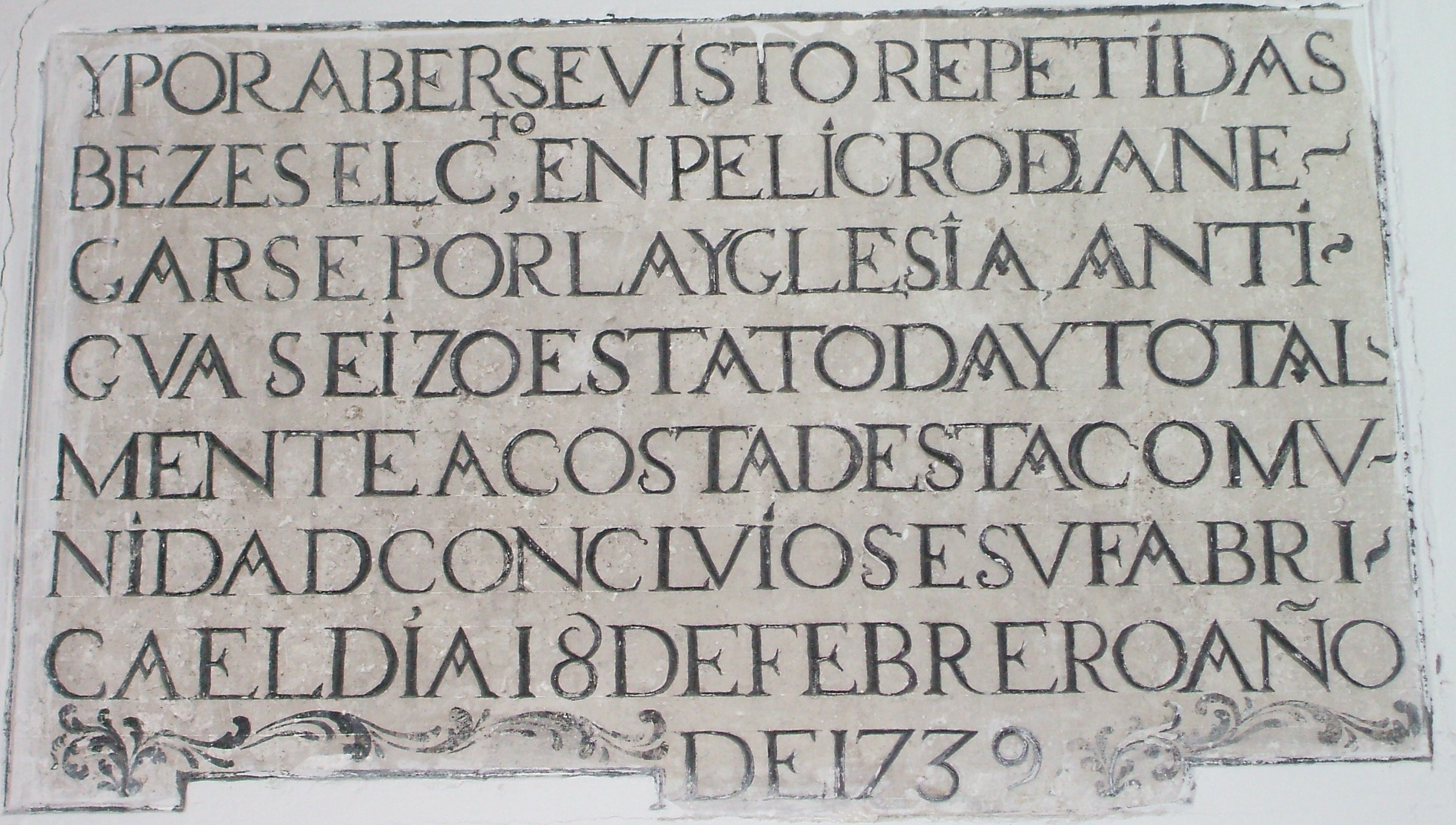
Foundation stone of the current church

=== Retable ===
The church contains five retables. Additional retables and various artworks are preserved within the convent's dependencies.

- Main retable

The main retable comes from the Sanctuary of Nuestra Señora del Henar. It is in the Baroque style, known as hexastyle, and comprises three canvases:

1. At the top, depicting the transverberation of Saint Teresa.
2. On the left of the transept, depicting Saint Peter.
3. Opposite, depicting Saint Paul.

In the central niche is the statue of the Immaculate Conception, from the original main retable. The ensemble is completed by two modern statues.

- Retable of the Immaculate Conception

In the Romanist Renaissance style, it is located opposite the main church entrance. This was the main retable of the original church, relocated after major construction. It is dedicated to the birth and childhood of the Lord and the life of the Virgin.

Before the church's construction was completed, the founders contracted sculptor Pedro de Bolduque to build the main retable, dedicated to the Immaculate Conception. The contract, signed on May 28, 1586, detailed the retable's dimensions, figures, materials, price, and payment terms:

The first base resting on the altar, where the columns stand, shall have four cartouches, and between each cartouche, in the center, shall be the tabernacle as shown in the drawing. On the two panels on either side of the street, the one on the right shall feature Saint John the Baptist in half-relief, and the one on the left, Saint Francis in half-relief. The columns above the base shall be of the Corinthian order with Doric bases, stretched from top to bottom. In the center, between the columns above the tabernacle, shall be Our Lady of the Conception in full relief. In the two compartments on either side, the right compartment shall feature the Adoration of the Magi in half-relief, and the left, when Our Lady found her Son in the temple among the doctors. Above the four columns shall be placed its entablature of architrave, frieze, and cornice. The second order above the Corinthian, in the central compartment, shall feature Our Lady of the Assumption in half-relief with angels lifting her in the air and swirling clouds. The right compartment shall depict the Annunciation in half-relief. The left compartment shall depict the Nativity of Our Lord. Above shall be its entablature, with Christ, Our Lady, and Saint John in full relief. Above the entablature shall be two carved coats of arms. The entire altarpiece shall be twenty feet high from the altar table to the scrolls of the pediment, and seven feet from there to the cross. The altarpiece, including the moldings’ wings, shall be fourteen feet wide.

— Velasco Bayón, 1981.

The sculptor fulfilled all contract terms, including the three-year construction timeline.

The Immaculate Conception statue is now in the central niche of the main retable, while the Calvary that crowned the ensemble is now in a smaller, Neoclassical retable opposite, due to the new church's different dimensions. In the place of the Immaculate Conception, a 17th-century full-relief statue of Saint Francis, attributed to the school of Gregorio Fernández, is now displayed. This small statue, with hands overlapped and exposed, has a head similar in expression, modeling, and hair technique to the Saint Francis Xavier in San Miguel, Valladolid, by Gregorio Fernández.

As stipulated in the contract, the founders’ coats of arms are on either side of the retable: on the left, the Rojas arms, in a field of gold, five blue stars in a cross; on the right, the Becerra arms, a pine tree with a cow at its base, all in natural colors.

The retable and its statues were painted by Gabriel de Cárdenas Maldonado, a local Valladolid-school painter whose triptych is held at the Prado Museum in Madrid. He completed the work in 1589, and the contract is preserved. The Immaculate Conception and Calvary were later repainted, with limited success.

- Retable of Saint Peter

Located on the left side of the transept, this Renaissance retable comes from the former church of San Pedro in Cuéllar, where it was the main retable. It was moved to this convent in the late 19th century after the church's suppression. It is a panel retable dedicated to the life of the Lord, the Virgin, and Saint Peter. The lower section features a tabernacle with a bas-relief of Christ, flanked by two apostles in full relief. An inscription runs across the ensemble: (Note: Original text: ESTE RETABLO MANDARON HACER GÓMEZ DE ROJAS Y Dª ANGELINA VELÁZQUEZ DE HERRERA, SU MUJER, A GLORIA DE DIOS NUESTRO SEÑOR Y DE LA GLORIOSA VIRGEN SANTA MARIA, SU MADRE NUESTRA SOBERANA SEÑORA, Y DEL BIENAVENTURADO APÓSTOL SAN PEDRO. ACABOSE AÑO DEL SEÑOR DE MIL Y QUINIENTOS Y SETENTA Y CINCO.)

THIS ALTARPIECE WAS COMMISSIONED BY GÓMEZ DE ROJAS AND DOÑA ANGELINA VELÁZQUEZ DE HERRERA, HIS WIFE, TO THE GLORY OF GOD OUR LORD AND THE GLORIOUS VIRGIN SAINT MARY, HIS MOTHER OUR SOVEREIGN LADY, AND THE BLESSED APOSTLE SAINT PETER. COMPLETED IN THE YEAR OF OUR LORD 1575.

- Retable of Saint Anne

On the right side of the transept, this retable, similar to that of Saint Peter, likely comes from the Convent of Santa Ana. Dated 1566, it depicts the history of Saint Anne. Like the Saint Peter retable, it is in the classicist Mannerist Renaissance style of the mid-16th century.

- Retable of the Calvary

In the Neoclassical style, it was built to house the Calvary from the original main retable by Bolduque. It features a gilded border with a starry background.

- Lost retables

In addition to the original main retable, the founders commissioned two collateral retables from Bolduque, which have not survived. They were decorated by the same painter who gilded the main retable, Gabriel de Cárdenas Maldonado. The contract describes them:

Furthermore, I, the said Pedro de Bolduque, am to make two additional collateral altarpieces, each approximately six feet wide, to be made according to the drawing... likewise, they shall be adorned with columns, entablature, and base as shown in the drawing, except that below the columns, cartouches shall be made as in the main altarpiece, and these altarpieces shall have an altar proportionate to their width.

— Velasco Bayón, 1981.

One was crowned by a painting of Saint Catherine, and the other by Saint Lucy. The predella featured sacramental inscriptions and the founders’ coats of arms, presumably Rojas on the Epistle side and Becerra on the Gospel side. Inside the convent, fragments of columns, likely from these retables, are preserved, matching the style of the main retable. The ensemble included two additional panels: the History of Saint Joachim and Saint Anne, on the right, and The Last Supper, on the left.

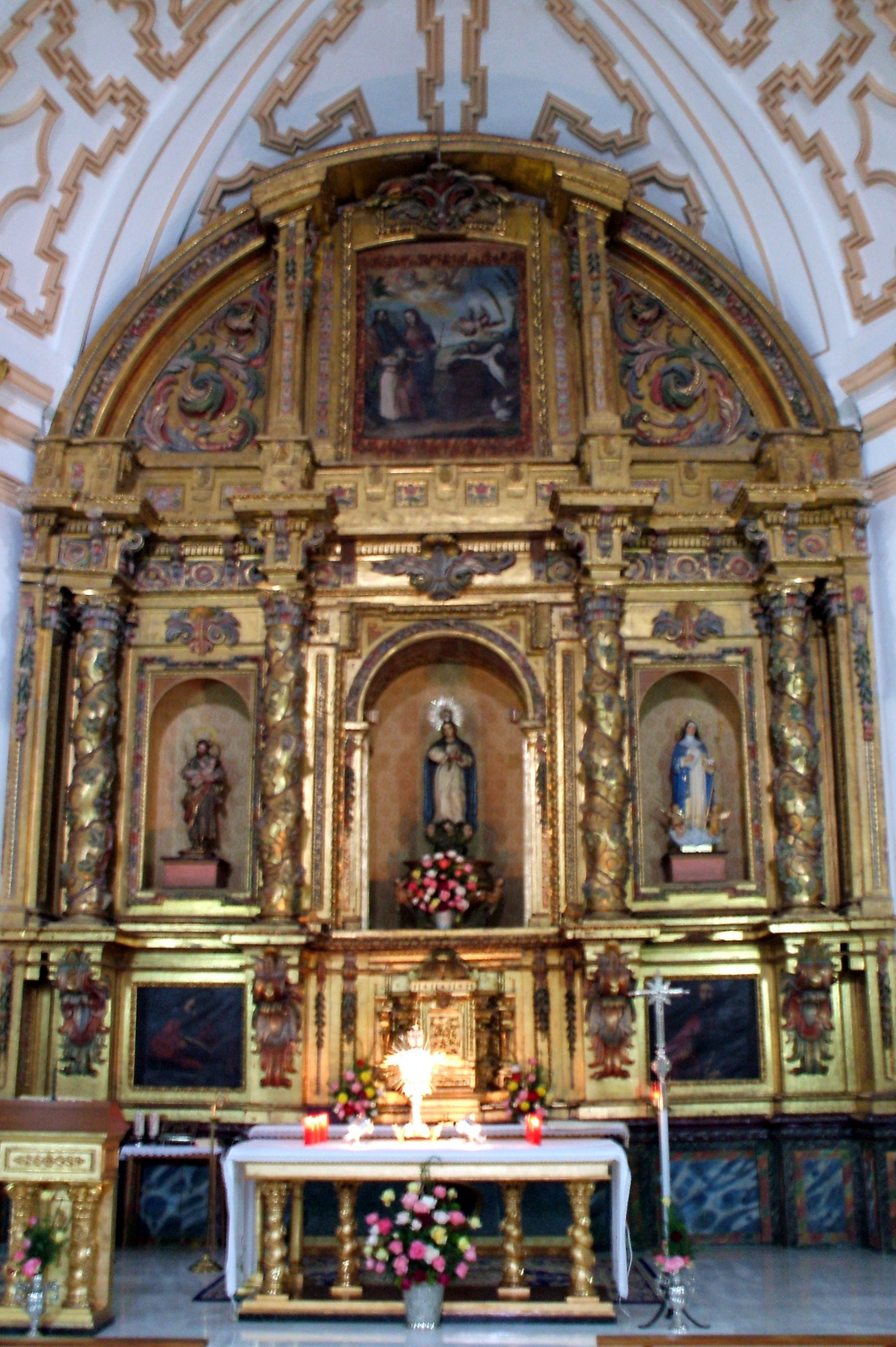
Main retable (17th century)

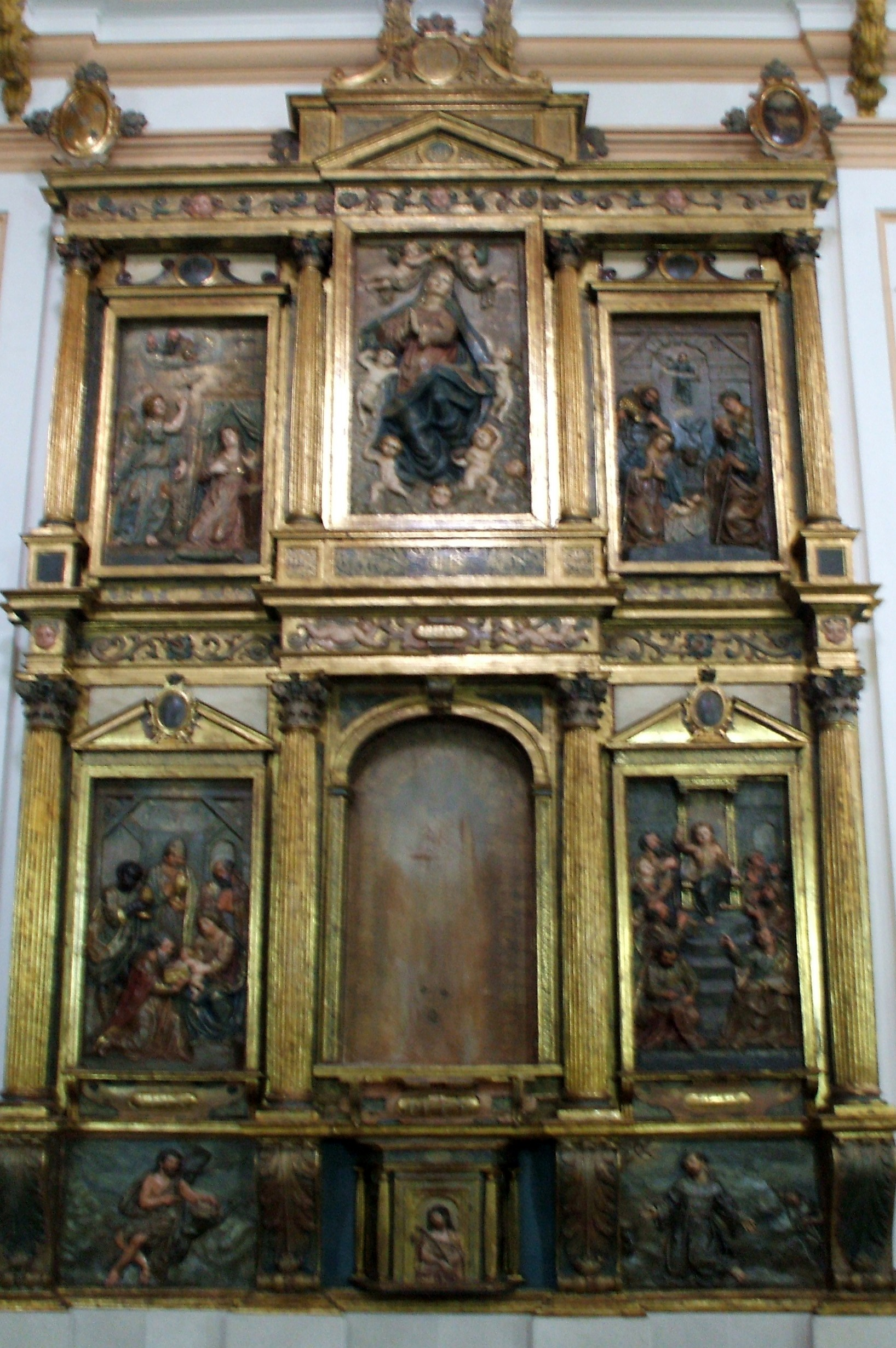
Retable of the Immaculate Conception (16th century)

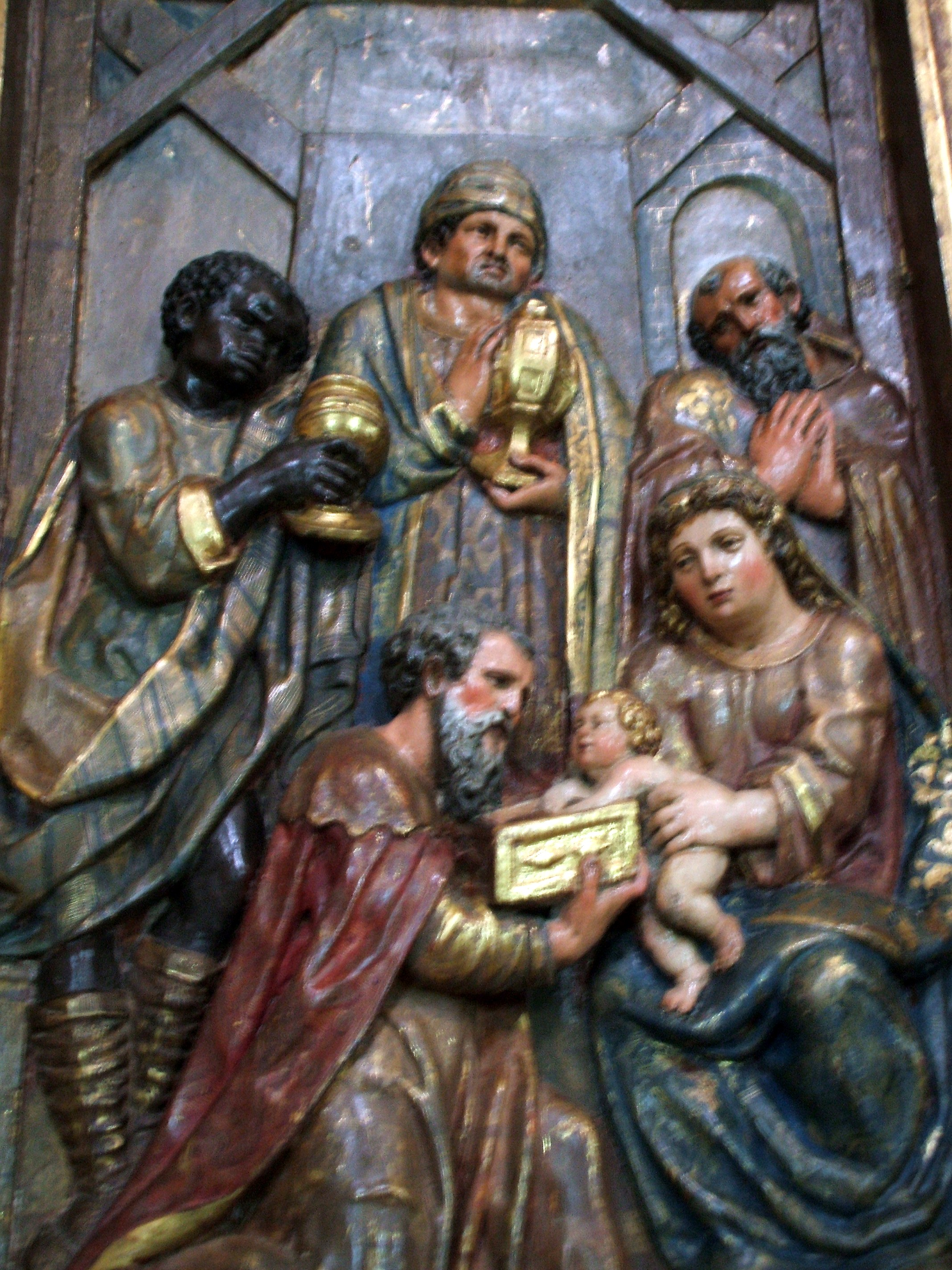
Detail of the Adoration of the Magi in the Retable of the Immaculate Conception

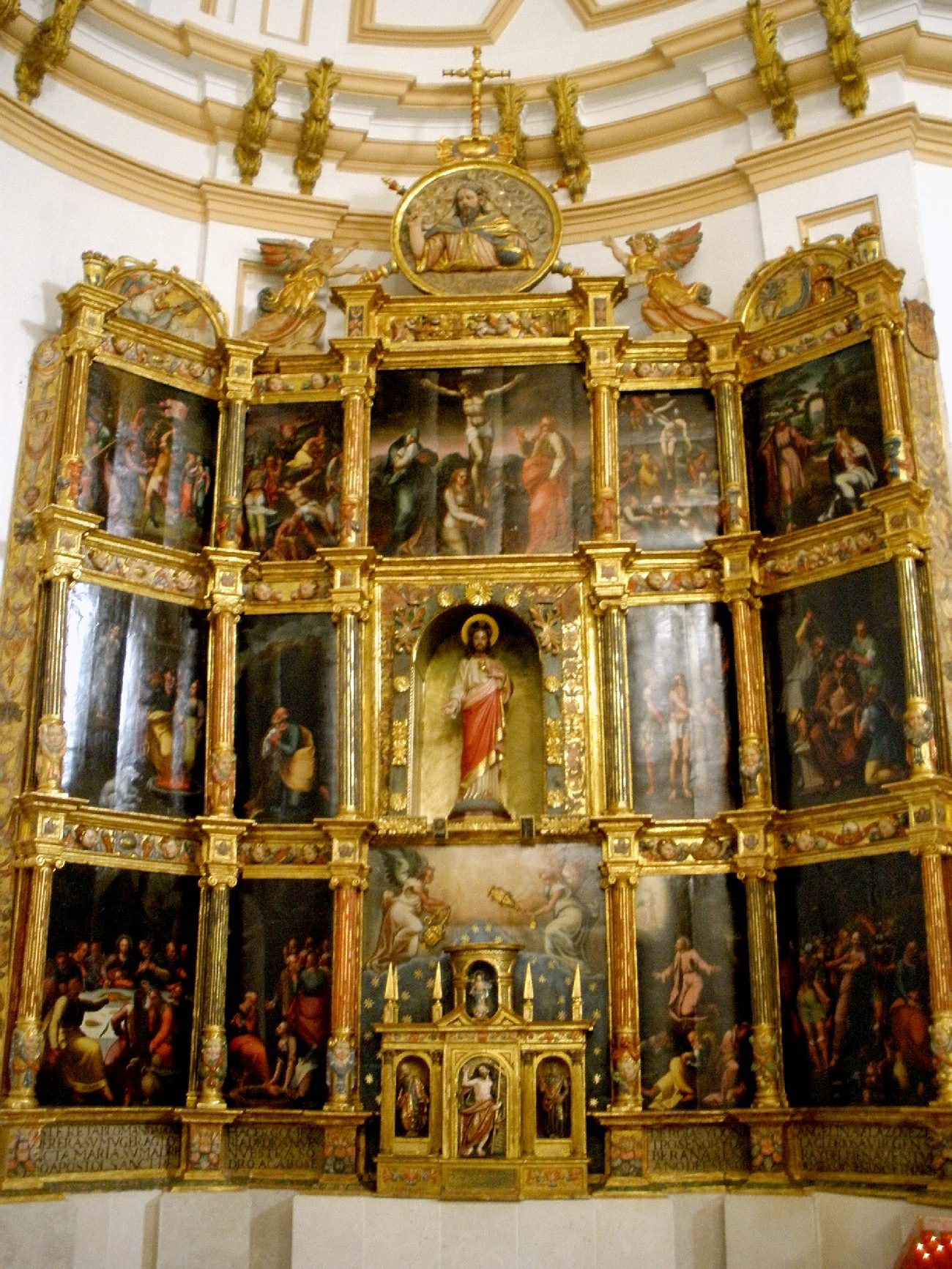
Retable of Saint Peter (16th century)

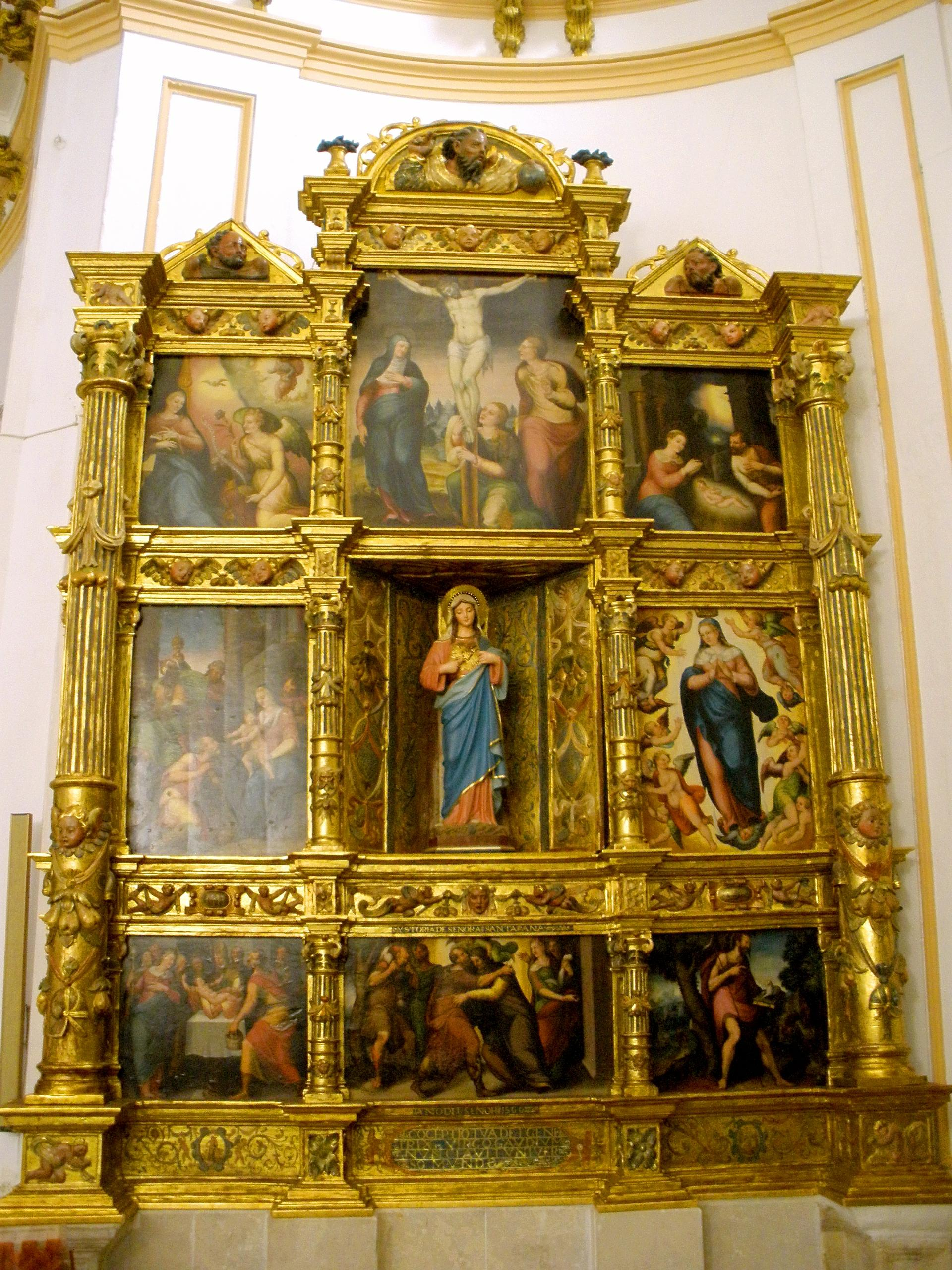
Retable of Saint Anne (16th century)

== Convent ==
As proposed by the founders to the Provincial of the Order, the convent was established in the Rojas family's ancestral home in Cuéllar. It is a 15th-century building with later additions, consisting of two floors and considerable dimensions. The second floor features brick panels, imitating Cuéllar's Mudéjar style. At the rear, it has a large garden, still in use today. Most of the second-floor grilles, crafted in a Castilian workshop and topped with a small Rojas family coat of arms, are preserved.

=== Artworks ===
Within the convent, the Conceptionist nuns preserve various artworks, some belonging to the convent and others from the nearby, now-defunct church of Santo Tomé. These include a statue of the apostle Thomas, a Virgin with Child (attributed to Pedro de Bolduque), Saint Agatha, and Saint Crispin.

== Bibliography ==
- Arevalillo García, Ismael (2020). "Acerca de las fundaciones religiosas en el Convento de San Francisco (Cuéllar, Segovia), desde el siglo XIII hasta 1835" [About the religious foundations in the Convent of San Francisco (Cuéllar, Segovia), from the 13th century to 1835]. Estudios del Patrimonio Cultural (in Spanish) (18): 6–23. eISSN 1988-8015.
- Tejero Cobos, Isidoro (1973). "Cuéllar, arte e historia" [Cuéllar, Art and History]. Estudios Segovianos (in Spanish) (74–75). ISSN 0210-7260.
- Velasco Bayón, Balbino (1970a). "Retablo de Pedro de Bolduque, en Cuéllar" [Altarpiece of Pedro de Bolduque in Cuéllar]. Estudios Segovianos (in Spanish) (64): 95–119. ISSN 0210-7260.
- Velasco Bayón, Balbino (1970b). "Documentos sobre la fundación del convento MM. Concepcionistas de Cuéllar" [Documents on the Foundation of the Conceptionist Convent in Cuéllar]. Archivo Ibero-Americano (in Spanish). 30 (117). ISSN 0004-0452.
- Velasco Bayón, Balbino (1981). Historia de Cuéllar [History of Cuéllar] (in Spanish) (1st ed.). Diputación Provincial de Segovia. ISBN 978-84-500-4620-5.
- Velasco Bayón, Balbino (1985). Cuéllar [Cuéllar] (in Spanish) (2nd ed.). Everest. ISBN 978-84-241-4434-0.
