= Gresser =

Gresser is a surname of German origin. Notable people with the surname include:

- Gisela Kahn Gresser (1906–2000), American chess player
- Ignatz Gresser (1835-1919), American soldier
- Lawrence Gresser (1851–1935), German-born American politician

== See also ==
- Cohen & Gresser
