= Ángel Martínez Casado =

Spanish writer (1947–2024)

Ángel Martínez Casado (born in Retuerto, León Province, Spain, 1947) and died in Virgen del Camino, León Province, Spain, 03/04/2024) was a Dominican friar and PhD (doctor) in History and Theology. He received humanistic and religious education at La Virgen del Camino College, from where he entered the novitiate in the Dominican Order in October 1965, in Palencia. He began his religious studies in Las Caldas de Besaya (Santander) and Salamanca, where he made solemn religious profession in 1973.

== Professional and Ecclesiastical Career ==
His doctoral thesis was supervised by Professor Julio Valdeón Baruque (as indicated by either Angel Martinez, on page 12 of your book), and later edited by San Esteban Editorial as Lope de Barrientos.Un intellectual en la corte de Juan II. He was ordained a priest on 30 March 1975. Since 1976 he has taught History of Philosophy in Greek and medieval in Higher Institute of Philosophy of Valladolid (since 1970, is integrated into the Pontifical University of Salamanca (UPSA) as Spanish Center for Advanced Studies and Ecclesiastical of Dominican), which is the current director. He combined his teaching activity with the studies of History that he culminated in 1981, obtaining in 1984 the doctorate in Philosophy and Letters, with a specialty in History.He was also professor at the Faculty of Theology of Valencia Catholic University Saint Vincent and since 1996 is being a professor of Church History in the Faculty of UPSA of Convent of St. Stephen and the Faculty of Theology of the Pontifical University of Salamanca. He also teaches specialized courses in Faculty of Philosophy of the Pontifical University of Salamanca. of the same university. He is Librarian of Convent of St. Stephen, and Technical Director of the Internet School of Theology "Santo Tomás de Aquino".

In 2008, he was appointed Corresponding Member of the Royal Academy of Doctors of Spain. Has also served as Vice Postulator of the Ecclesiastical Court in charge of the diocesan canonization of Mother Teresa Maria de Jesus Ortega Pardo, the former prioress of Olmedo Monastery, process which closed on 18 July 2006.

He also held other conventual positions and domestic collaboration, such as subprior of the convent, director and editor of the magazine "Estudios Filosóficos" from 1985 to 1990, archivist, member of the provincial commission for intellectual life, and perpetual director of the Higher Institute of Philosophy. Due to an illness he had been suffering from since the mid-1990s, he was transferred from Salamanca to the infirmary of the Virgen del Camino in Leon in February 2020, where he died at the age of 76 on 13 March 2024.

== Bibliography ==
=== Books ===
His books have been, among others in order of publication:

- 1994, EDITORIAL SAN ESTEBAN, Title: Lope de Barrientos: Un Intellectual de la Corte de Juan II(Lope de Barrientos: An Intellectual Court Juan II), , Salamanca, ISBN 84-87557-85-6
- 2006, EDITORIAL SAN ESTEBAN, Title: Domingo de Soto: La causa de los pobres(Domingo de Soto: The cause of the poor), , Salamanca, ISBN 84-8260-182-2

=== Publishing Error Fe ===
- 2003, SAN ESTEBAN EDITORIAL Title: Peña de Francia: Historia, arte, entorno(Rock of France: History, art, environment), , ISBN Although 84-8260-125-3 attributed to Angel Martínez Casado, actually wrote another Dominican of the same convent, Angel Perez Casado.

=== Articles en magazines ===
- 1976, Magazine Estudio Filosóficos, Valladolid`s Senior Institute of Philosophy, 182 pp: Title: Índices Generales 1951-1976 (General indexes 1951-1976). With collaboration of Juan Manuel ALMARZA. ISSN 0210-6086.
- 1983, Magazine Archivos Leoneses: revista de estudios y documentación de los Reinos Hispano-Occidentales, Nº 74: pp. 263–312 (Leoneses Files: journal of studies and documentation of Hispano-Western Kingdoms), Title: Cátaros en León: testimonio de Lucas de Tuy (Cathars in Leon: Lucas of Tuy testimony); ISSN 0004-0630
- 1984, Magazine Estudio Filosóficos, Valladolid`s Senior Institute of Philosophy, Nº 33, pp. 59–84, Title: Aristotelismo hispánico en la primera mitad del siglo XII (Hispanic Aristotelianism in the first half of the twelfth century), pp. 353-359, Title: V centenario de Francisco de Vitoria (V centenary of Francisco de Vitoria), ISSN 0210-6086
- 1985, Magazine Estudio Filosóficos, Valladolid`s Senior Institute of Philosophy, Nº 34, pp. 545–548, Title: El pensamiento leonés en el siglo XII (Thought lions in the twelfth century), ISSN 0210-6086
- 1985, Magazine XX Siglos VI, Nº 24, pp. 41-50, Title: Evocación de Lope de Barrientos (Evocation of Lope de Barrientos), ISSN 1130-3948.
- 1996, Magazine Archivo Dominicano, EDITORIAL SAN ESTEBAN, Nº 17: pp. 25-64, Title: La situación jurídica de los conversos según Lope de Barrientos (The legal status of converts as Lope de Barrientos), ISSN 0211-5255
- 1997, Magazine Estudio Filosóficos, Valladolid`s Senior Institute of Philosophy, Nº 44, pp. 7–38, Title: La filosofía áulica de Lope de Barrientos (The aulic philosophy of Lope de Barrientos), ISSN 0210-6086.
- 1997, Magazine Ciencia Tomista, EDITORIAL SAN ESTEBAN, Vol. 124, pp. 159-177, Title: Disidencias manifestadas en León en la primera mitad del siglo XIII (Expressed dissent in Leon in the first half of the thirteenth century). ISSN 0210-0398.
- 1998, Magazine Studium Legionense, Nº 189, pp. 189–244, Title: La teología leonesa en la primera mitad del siglo XIII (Leon theology in the first half of the thirteenth century), ISSN 0210-8321.
- 2002, Magazine Estudio Filosóficos, Valladolid`s Senior Institute of Philosophy, 240 pp: Title: Índices Generales 1977-2001, vol. 26-50 (General Index 1977-2001). ISSN 0210-6086.
- Magazine Cuadernos salmantinos de filosofía, Nº 30, 2003, pp. 629-646, Title: Los pobres y Domingo de Soto (The poor and Domingo de Soto). ISSN 0210-4857
- 2005, Magazine Imágenes de la FE, Sumario nº 397. November, Theology section, Title: La libertad del pensamiento. Una nueva filosofía para entender a Dios (Freedom of thought. A new philosophy to understand God), ISSN 1575-3786
- 2009, Magazine Ciencia Tomista, EDITORIAL SAN ESTEBAN, Tomo 136, Nº. 438, pp. 83-100, Title: El Magisterio de Domingo Báñez y su proyección en México (The Magisterium of Domingo Banez and its projection in Mexico). ISSN 0210-0398
- 2009, Magazine Estudio Filosóficos, Valladolid`s Senior Institute of Philosophy, Vol. 58, Nº 168, pp. 213–241, Title: La cuestión de la existencia de Dios en los iniciadores de la Escuela de Salamanca (The question of the existence of God in the initiators of the School of Salamanca), ISSN 0210-6086,
- 2010, Magazine Dominicana de Teología 6, pp. 27-43, Title: Las reivindicaciones de fray Bartolomé de la Casas (The claims of Fray Bartolomé de las Casas). ISSN 1980-1963.

=== Collaborations in Books ===
- 1983, EDITORIAL OPE, Caleruega, Nueve personajes históricos (Nine historical people). pp. 173–188, Title: San Pío V, papa y defensor de la fe (St. Pius V, Pope and defender of the faith), ISBN 84-7188-149-7.
- 1989, Biblioteca de Autores Cristianos (BAIC), Madrid, Santo TOMÁS DE AQUINO, Sum of Theology Parts I-II, issues 1-21. Translation of the text and technical references. ISBN 84-220-1351-7.
- 1991, Valladolid, In association with J. M. ALMARZA y J. LÓPEZ: Guía de Valladolid. Rutas históricas y monumentales por la provincia de Valladolid (Guide Valladolid. Monumental and historic routes through the province of Valladolid). 111 pp. ISBN 84-87559-02-6.
- 1994, Biblioteca de Autores Cristianos (BAIC), Madrid, Santo TOMÁS DE AQUINO, Sum of Theology Parts II-II (b), issues 80-140: technical references, pp. 20–390. ISBN 84-7914-118-2
- 1994, Biblioteca de Autores Cristianos (BAIC), Madrid, Santo TOMÁS DE AQUINO, Sum of Theology Parts, vol. V: pp. 819–822: References to complete the text of the Sum of Theology ISBN 84-7914-149-2.
- 1997, Editores: Universidad de Valladolid y Secretariado de Publicaciones e Intercambio Editorial. Title: La filosofía española en Castilla y León: de los orígenes al Siglo de Oro, (Coordinador: Maximiliano Fartos Martínez ) (Spanish philosophy in Castilla y León: the origins of the Golden Age); three issues on pp. 71–78; Title: Herejes en Castilla y León en el siglo XIII (Heretics in Castile and León in the thirteenth century); pp. 79–86: Title: La escuela aristotélica de León en el siglo XIII (The Aristotelian school of Leon in the 13th century); pp. 87–96, Title: Lope de Barrientos. ISBN 84-7762-751-7
- 2000, Coord: Juan Tomás Pastor García, Lorenzo Velázquez Campo and Maximiliano Fartos Martínez, La filosofía española en Castilla y León: de la Ilustración al siglo XX (Spanish philosophy in Castilla y León: the Enlightenment to the Twentieth Century), two collaborations on pp. 703–712, Title: Santiago Ramírez, and pp. 713–720, Title: Guillermo Fraile. ISBN 84-8448-069-0
- 2001, Biblioteca de Autores Cristianos, Madrid, TOMAS DE AQUINO SANTO. Opúsculos y cuestiones selectas, edición bilingüe, vol. I, pp.671-824, Title: "Las criaturas espirituales" (Spiritual Creatures), accommodation of the text, introduction, translation and notes. ISBN 84-7914-511-0.
- 2001, Edibesa, Madrid, Nuevo año cristiano, Abril, (Coordinador: J. A. MARTÍNEZ PUCHE) págs. 394-407; Title:San Pío V, Papa dominico (St. Pius V, Dominican pope) ISBN 84-8407-203-7.
- 2002, Aben Ezra Ediciones, Madrid, Edición crítica del Tractatus contra Madianitas et Ismaelitas adversarios et detractores fidelium qui de populo israelitico originem traxerunt. En (Coordinador: Carlos del Valle), págs. 119-239, Title: El tratado contra madianitas e ismaelitas de Juan de Torquemada. Contra la discriminación conversa (The treaty against Midianites and Ishmaelites of Juan de Torquemada. Against Discrimination talks). ISBN 84-88324-13-8.
- 2003, Biblioteca de Autores Cristianos, Madrid, Tomas de Aquino Santo. Opúsculos y cuestiones selectas, edición bilingüe, vol. II, pp.293-384, Title: "Cuestión sobre el apetito del bien" (Question about the appetite of good). Edition, translation and notes, and pp. 619–676-384: Title: "Cuestión sobre el mal" (Question about evil). Translation and quotes, ISBN 84-7914-664-4.
- 2003, Editorial San Esteban, Salamanca, La ética, aliento de lo eterno" (Ethics, the eternal breath), (Coordinador: Luis Méndez Francisco), pp. 173-188. Title: "Derechos de los pobres según Domingo de Soto (Rights of the poor as Domingo de Soto), ISBN 84-8260-133-4
- 2005, Biblioteca de Autores Cristianos (BAIC), Madrid, Santo TOMÁS DE AQUINO, Sum of Teology, CD-ROM edition : Proofreading editing.
- 2006, Coord: José Román Flecha Andrés, Miguel Anxo Pena González and Ángel Galindo García, Gozo y esperanza: memorial Prof. Dr. Julio A. Ramos Guerreira, pp. 485-500, Title: El cielo y los sueños: explicación tradicional (Heaven and Dreams: traditional explanation), ISBN 84-7299-704-9
- 2008, Biblioteca de Autores Cristianos, Madrid, ' TOMAS DE AQUINO SANTO. Opúsculos y cuestiones selectas, edición bilingüe, vol. V, pp.19-328., Title: "Compendio de Teología". Edition, translation and notes, and pp. 729–768, Title: "Tratado sobre las razones de la fe" (Treaty on the grounds of faith). Edition, translation and notes, ISBN 978-84-7914-921-5.
- 2008, Fundación Universitaria Española, Madrid, La cultura española en la historia el barroco: ciclo promovido por la Real Academia de Doctores de España, con el patrocinio del Casino de Madrid, pp. 285–310; Title: Teología en el barroco. Controversias y devociones (Theology in the Baroque. Controversies and devotions), ISBN 978-84-7392-708-6
- 2008, Fundación Universitaria Española, Madrid, La Cultura Española en la Historia. El Renacimiento: pp. 281-300; Title: "La Escuela de Salamanca, sus grandes maestros dominicos: Lectura actual de su doctrina (The School of Salamanca, the great masters Dominicans: Reading your current doctrine), ISBN 978-84-7392-707-9.
- 2009, Fundación Universitaria Española, Madrid, La espiritualidad naturalista de fray Luis de Granada: la contemplación de Dios en la naturaleza en la Introducción del símbolo de la fe, by Julián de Cos Pérez de Camino, Thesis supervised by Professor UPSA (Pontifical Faculty of Theology San Esteban) Ángel Martínez Casado. Madrid ISBN 978-84-7392-733-8 Y ISBN 84-7392-733-8
- 2011, EDITORIAL SAN ESTEBAN, Salamanca, El grito y su eco.El sermón de Antón Montesino, with index of Ramón Hernández Martín, Gregorio Celada and Brian J. Pierce, and studies of Mauricio Beuchot, Francisco Javier Martínez Real and Jesús Espeja, work based on the transcripción del Sermón de Montesinos por el dominico leonés Prof. Ángel Martínez Casado, of the manuscripts of Fray Bartolomé de las Casas retaining the Spanish National Library. ISBN 978-84-8260-262-2

He managed the magazine Estudios Filosóficos since 1985 to 1990.

=== Conferences ===
- 2003 address summer course on the military orders, in which gave a lecture entitled 'The Templar Monk' held at El Burgo de Osma, from 4 to 8 August. [www.cdlmadrid.org/cdl/htdocs/impresos/pdfs/burgodeosma.pdf], conducted in the summer courses of the University of Santa Catalina
- 2nd Conference Seminar of Conmemoración del V Centenario(V centenary commemoration), of the UAL, on claims that once made Fray Bartolome de las Casas, organized by the University of Almería, the Ministry of Education and Science and CSIC, also collaborate the Vice-Rector of Culture, University Extension, and Sports, the Vice-Rector of professor and Academic Planning, the Vice-Rector for Internationalization and Development Cooperation, and the Faculty of Humanities and Education Sciences at the University of Almería. The sessions are sponsored by Asempal and the Chamber of Commerce of Almería, IAE, and Spanish National Research Council(Section of Hispanic Studies School).

== See also ==
- Dominican Order
- Dominicans in Ireland
- Dominican Order in the United States
