= José Antonio González Caviedes =

Spanish politician

Spanish Senator for Valladolid
- In office 29 October 1989 – 4 December 1996
- Succeeded by: Maria Mercedes Coloma Pesquera

Personal details
- Born: José Antonio González Caviedes; 28 November 1938 Remondo, Spain
- Died: 4 December 1996 (aged 58) Montuenga, Spain
- Party: People's Party
- Other political affiliations: FET y de las JONS; Union of the Democratic Centre; People's Alliance
- Spouse: Mercedes Durántez
- Children: 3, including Miriam González Durantez

José Antonio González Caviedes (28 November 1938 – 4 December 1996) was a Spanish politician. He was mayor of the small town of Olmedo, and later served as People's Party senator for Valladolid from 1989 until his death in 1996.

He died after suffering a heart attack whilst driving, which caused his car (a Mercedes Benz 300-TD) to collide with a lorry.

== Personal life ==
González Caviedes was married and had three children. His daughter Miriam González Durántez is married to the British politician leader of the Liberal Democrats and former Deputy Prime Minister Nick Clegg.

== See also ==
- Politics of Spain
