= Miriam González Durántez =

Spanish lawyer (born 1968)

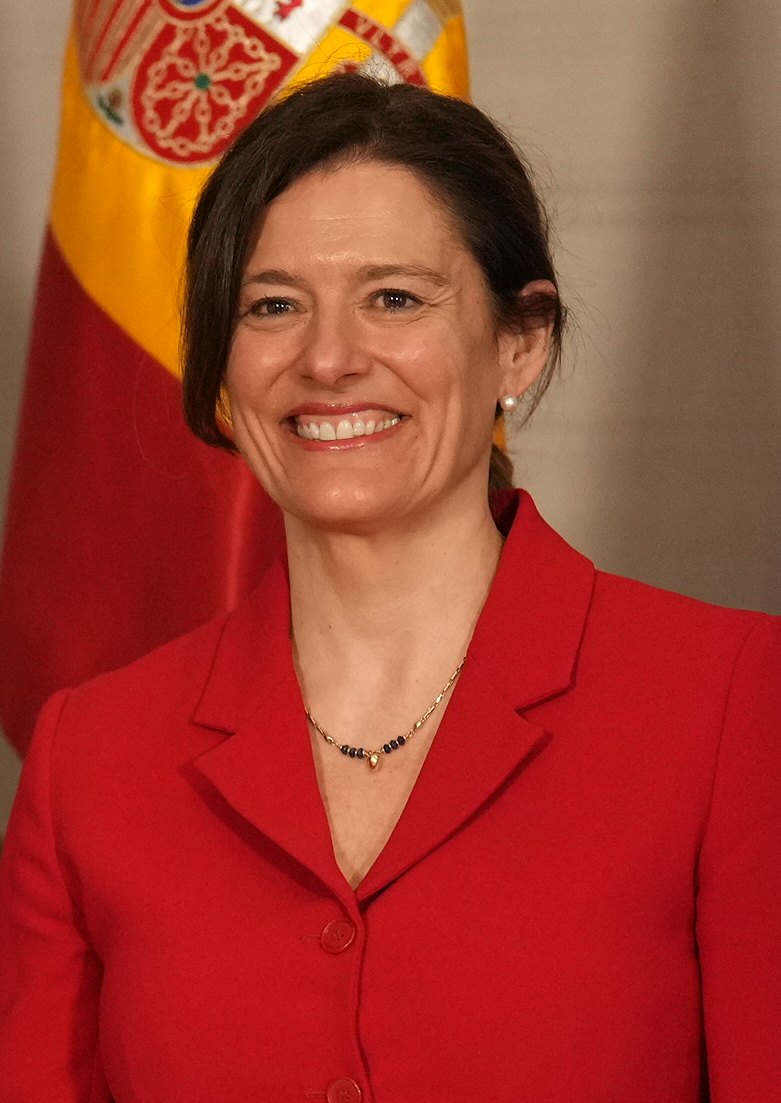
- González Durántez in 2024

President of Democracia 21
- Incumbent
- Assumed office 10 October 2026
- Preceded by: office established

Personal details
- Born: 31 May 1968 (age 58) Olmedo, Valladolid, Spain
- Party: United Kingdom; Liberal Democrats; Spain; Democracia 21 (2026–present)
- Spouse: Nick Clegg (m. 2000)
- Children: 3
- Parent: José Antonio González Caviedes (father)
- Education: University of Valladolid
- Occupation: Lawyer

Myrian Mercedes González Durántez, known as Miriam González Durántez, Lady Clegg (born 31 May 1968) is a Spanish international trade lawyer, vice chair of UBS Europe, founder of Inspiring Girls and politician. She is married to Nick Clegg, who served as Deputy Prime Minister of the United Kingdom from 2010 to 2015. In 2026, she founded the liberal Democracia 21 party.

== Early life ==
Miriam González Durántez was born to two teachers in Olmedo, in the Spanish province of Valladolid. Her father, José Antonio González Caviedes, was also Mayor of Olmedo and served as a senator for Valladolid for the conservative People's Party (PP) from 1989 until he died in 1996. She studied law at the University of Valladolid and then won a postgraduate scholarship to the College of Europe in Bruges, Belgium. She met Nick Clegg in Bruges, and continued to work in Brussels.

== Career ==
Having previously worked as a trade negotiator and advisor on trade law, and relations with the Middle East to both the European Union and the British Government, González Durántez is a partner at Cohen & Gresser, where she is co-chair of the firm's International Trade and Government Regulation practice. Prior to that, she worked at Dechert and DLA Piper for six years. She was head of EU trade while at Dechert and head of international trade law at DLA Piper.

González Durántez is considered an expert on European Union law and regulation, and co-authored the book Regulatory Aspects of the WTO Telecoms Agreements.

She is a Member of the European Council of Foreign Relations.

Since October 2013 González Durántez has been the honorary president of Canning House in London, the home of the Hispanic and Luso-Brazilian Council.

González Durántez is vice chair of UBS Europe. Until 2018, she was a member of Board and chair of the Audit and Remuneration Committees of UBS UK (UBSL). She was also on the Board of Directors of Acciona, S.A. between June 2010 and July 2014.

González published the book Devuélveme el Poder on Spanish politics in October 2019. She also published the cookbook, Made In Spain: Recipes and stories from my country and beyond in 2016.

González is the chair and founder of international charity, Inspiring Girls. Active globally in 14 countries, the charity aims to raise the aspirations of young girls by connecting them with female role models. The Inspiring Girls Video Hub is due for launch in Autumn 2019.

== Democracia 21 ==
In June 2026, González registered a new centrist political party in Spain bearing the name Democracia 21. Vowing to "clean up" the system in the wake of several corruption scandals, she stated that she would seek inspiration from her time living in Silicon Valley in California and its "relentless focus on the future". However, a spokesperson for González stated that registration was only an "administrative step", and that no decision had yet been made on whether or not to formally launch Democracia 21 as a new political party. In October 2026, it was announced that Democracia 21 would stand candidates in two constituencies, Barcelona and Madrid, in the 2026 Spanish general election.

== Personal life ==
González Durántez dated the British politician Nick Clegg for several years in Brussels before they married in 2000. The couple have three sons. She insisted on giving their children Spanish names if they were to have the family name "Clegg". She is a practising Roman Catholic, and the couple agreed that their children would be raised as such, though her husband is agnostic. She has not taken British citizenship and so, as an EU citizen who is not a Commonwealth or Irish citizen, she can vote in local and European elections; but not at UK general elections.

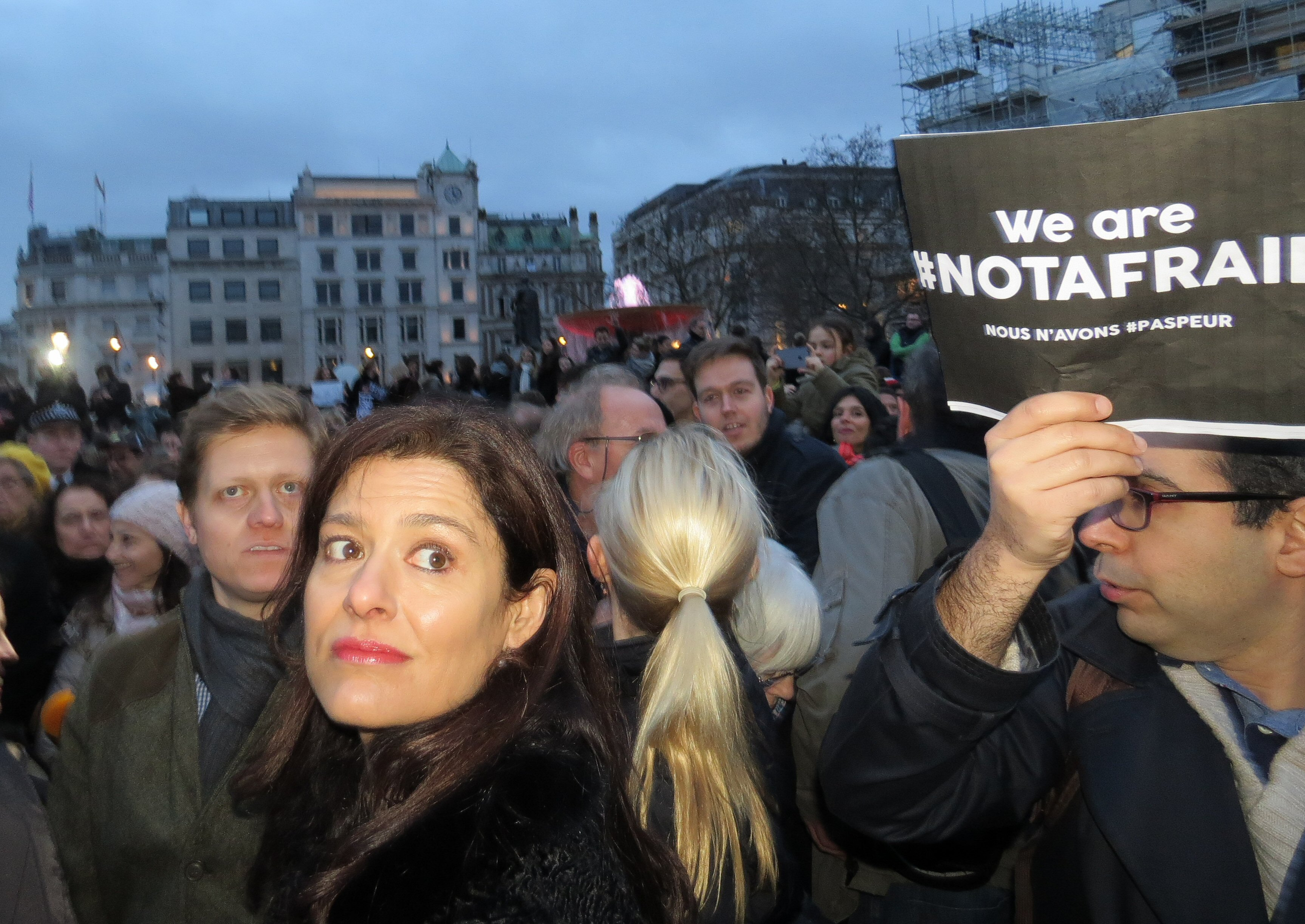
González Durántez attends the Je suis Charlie rally in Trafalgar Square, January 2015

González Durántez spoke of her relationship with the United Kingdom in a 2014 interview stating that after living in the country she:

"felt a freedom that I had never felt before in my life, a freedom to be myself. I come from a culture, in Spain, in Brussels, where, if you want to be a lawyer, you study law, if you want to be an economist, you study economy. Whatever you do early in your life determines what you do later on. When I came here, I went for lots of chats with people because I didn't know what to do. And pretty much all of them said, 'What do you want to do?' And I was like, 'Me? You want to know what I think? I have a choice?'"

As of 2021, González Durántez lives in California.

== 2010 UK general election campaign ==
When Sarah Brown and Samantha Cameron became increasingly involved in the media and 2010 UK general election campaigns, González Durántez publicly said that she would be willing to help with the campaign but, unlike Cameron, she would be unable to take time off from work and her family life to take part. Asked by a Spanish newspaper whether she would quit her job, González Durántez said that "If Nick were Prime Minister and I had to give up my job to support the country, I would have no problem in doing so."

== Bibliography ==
- Made In Spain: Recipes and stories from my country and beyond (Hodder & Stoughton, 2016) ISBN 9781473639003
- Devuélveme el Poder: Why a liberal reform is needed in Spain (Península, Planeta, 2019) ISBN 9788499428574
