= Bartolomé de Olmedo =

Spanish priest

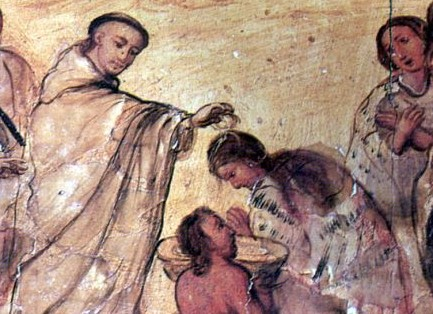
A 1678 painting of Bartolomé de Olmedo' baptizing Tlaxcalan women.

Bartolomé de Olmedo (c. 1485 – 1524) was a Spanish priest who accompanied Hernan Cortes on his 1519 expedition. He was the first Christian priest to set foot in Mexico.

== Life ==
De Olmedo was a Mercedarian friar born in Olmedo inside Castille in 1481. During his time in Mexico, he was the primary religious representative in Cortes' party. He converted and baptized numerous natives of Mexico, including La Malinche.
