= Democracia 21 =

Spanish political party

Democracy 21 Democracia 21
- Abbreviation: D21; DEM
- President: Miriam González Durántez
- Vice Presidents: Juan González-Barba Pera; Maricé Sánchez-Macián
- Director General: Manel Rodríguez Murillo
- Founder: Miriam González Durántez
- Founded: 10 October 2026
- Headquarters: Vía de las Dos Castillas, 33, Pozuelo de Alarcón, Madrid
- Ideology: Liberalism
- Political position: Centre
- Colours: Yellow
- Slogan: Volver a creer ("Believe again")

Website
- democracia21.es

Democracia 21 (English: Democracy 21, D21), styled as democracia21, is a liberal political party in Spain, formed in 2026. For the 2026 Spanish general election, the party will run in electoral alliance with Citizens and the Union of Independent Citizens (UCIN) in the Madrid and Barcelona constituencies.

== Background ==
In 2023, Miriam González Durántez, a lawyer specialising in international law and wife of former British Deputy Prime Minister Nick Clegg, established a non-profit organisation named España Mejor (Better Spain) to develop public policy proposals.

In June 2026, González Durántez registered the name Democracia 21. She vowed to "clean up" the system in the wake of several corruption scandals, stating that she would seek inspiration from her time living in Silicon Valley in California and its "relentless focus on the future". However, a spokesperson for González stated that the registration was only an "administrative step", and that no decision had yet been made on whether or not to formally launch Democracia 21 as a new political party.

== 2026 general election ==
In October 2026, it was announced that Democracia 21 would run in the 2026 Spanish general election. The party announced it would only stand candidates in two constituencies, Barcelona and Madrid, as those are the constituencies that grant more members of parliament under the Spanish electoral system.

Present at the 10 October launch event were former Union, Progress and Democracy (UPyD) politicians Fernando Maura Barandiarán and Beatriz Becerra.

At that event, González Durántez announced some of the party's main policies, which include removing housing taxes for those under 35, term limits, judicial independence, a government ethical code and specialised anti-corruption courts.

On 14 October 2026, Democracia 21 announced an electoral agreement with Ciudadanos and the Union of Independent Citizens (UCIN). The three parties registered an electoral coalition under the name "Democracia para el Siglo 21" to contest the Madrid and Barcelona constituencies. González Durántez welcomed the participation of Ciudadanos members, but criticised the party's former leadership, arguing that it had eventually reproduced practices which its supporters had originally entered politics to change.

Former Ciudadanos leader Albert Rivera was among those who questioned the strategic timing of the project. In August 2026, Rivera told El País that, although there was sociologically a substantial centrist electorate, the polarised political climate and Spain's electoral system favoured tactical voting. He warned that dividing the centre and centre-right vote could be "a shot in the foot".

== See also ==
- Liberalism in Spain
- Politics of Spain
