= Palace of Peter the Cruel, Cuéllar =

Palace in Cuéllar, Spain

Palace of Don Peter The Cruel
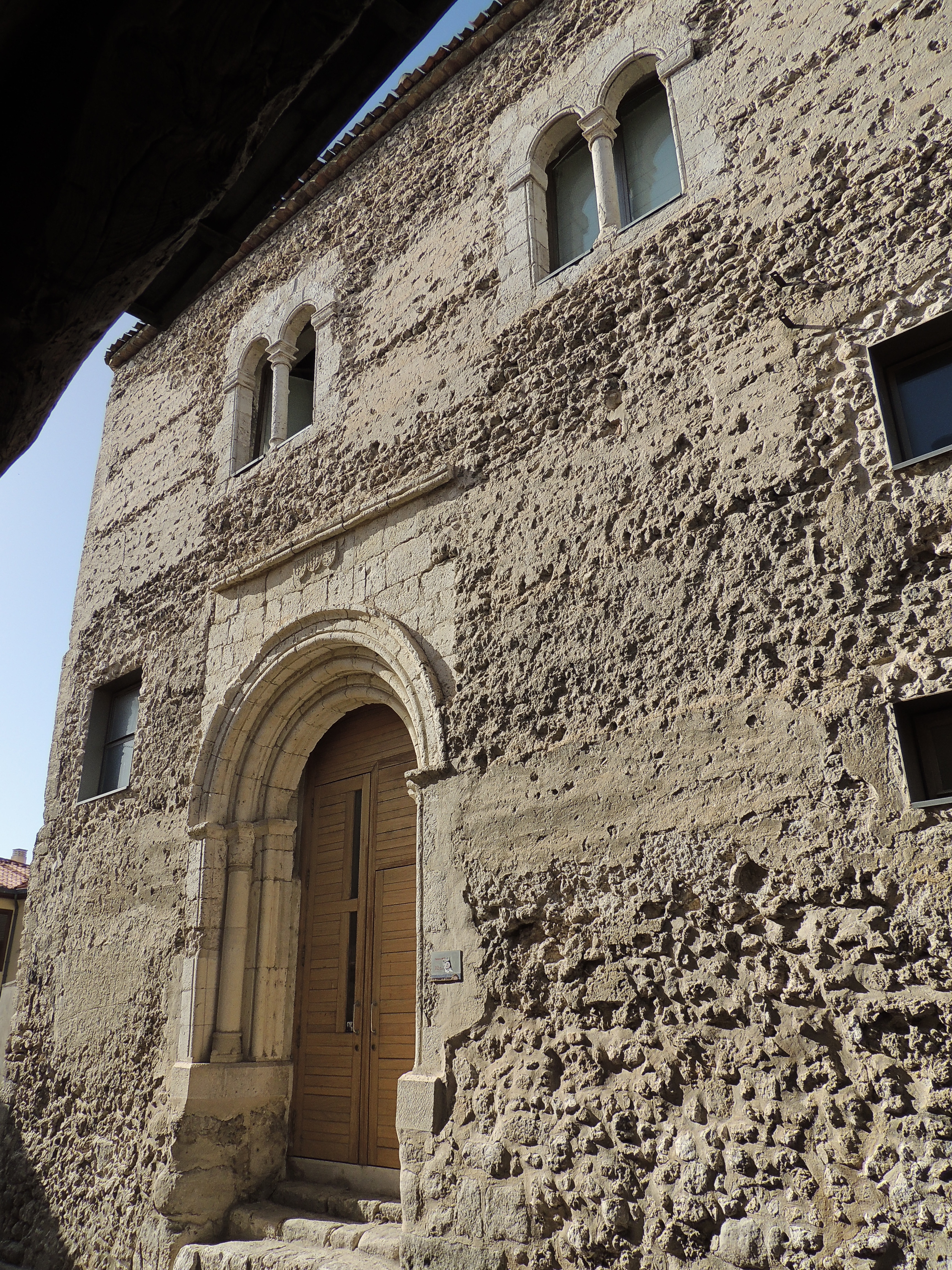
- Bien de Interés Cultural; Patrimonio histórico español
- Interactive map of Palace of Don Peter The Cruel
- 41.401664°N 4.314125°W
- Location: Cuéllar Segovia Spain

History
- Built: 14th–20th centuries

The Palace of Peter the Cruel, Palace of the Velázquez or Casa de la Torre is a building of Romanesque origin from the 13th century which is located in the town of Cuéllar, a municipality in the province of Segovia, in the autonomous community of Castilla and Leon (Spain).

It was the Casa Solariega of the Velázquez de Cuéllar family, who from the 17th century called it Casa de la Torre. It is currently known by the name of "Peter I" for having this Castilian monarch celebrated his wedding banquet with Juana de Castro in the building in 1354.

It was declared a Bien de Interés Cultural on 20 July 1974.

== History ==
The first records of its existence date from the year 1348, when Don Juan Manuel, son of the infante Don Manuel, donated the complex to Elvira Blázquez, wife of Pedro González Dávila, repopulator of Ávila and head of the Velázquez of Cuéllar lineage, who arrived in the town at the beginning of the 14th century and in a few years became one of the most important characters of the Cuellaran era, as evidenced by being one of the founders of the Casa de los Linajes de Cuéllar (House of the Lineages of Cuéllar). The donation was granted by letter dated 12 October of the aforementioned year, stating:

Let all those who read this letter know that I, Don Juan, fixed of the Infante Don Manuel, Adelantado Mayor of the Frontier, for doing good and mercy to you Doña Elvira, wife of Pedro González, deceased, my vassal and my alcayde who was in Cuéllar... the district of Señor Sant Esteuan of our town of Cuellar together with the houses that we have there and our inheritance of Villoria...

— Gonzalo de la Torre

Undoubtedly, the document refers to the palace complex, located in the neighborhood behind the St. Stephen Church.

The building, together with the inheritance and the palace in Viloria del Henar, was added to the family estate, passing from generation to generation; firstly to the Counts of Cobatillas and later to the Marquises of Vellosillo. In the 17th century it was owned by Louis Jerome de Contreras y Velázquez de Cuéllar, 1st Count of Cobatillas and 1st Viscount of Lagoon of Contreras, who was titled Lord of the entailed estates and Casa de la Torre, as well as the Palace of Viloria.

Since then, and up to the confiscation of Mendizábal, the building remained in the Velázquez family. Later it passed into the hands of the family of the poet Alfonsa de la Torre. At the beginning of the 20th century, it became a chicory factory, staying like that for several decades and suffering the same fate as other historic buildings of the town.

Finally, the palace was inherited by Alfonsa de la Torre, who wanted to turn it into a cultural foundation that would bear her name, as she left stated in her will. However, due to a confusing wording on the will, her brother Alfonso, an illiterate man, and Ángeles Fernández, an Asturian victim of José García Nieto, were considered as heirs. In the 1950 Adonais Prize for Poetry, José García Nieto awarded himself using Ángeles Fernández, (Note: The winning work was submitted under the pseudonym Juana García Noreña (Initials of José García Nieto) when her real name was Ángeles Fernández Borbolla. The author was García Nieto, who was part of the jury on that year, presenting his work as if it was Ángeles Fernández's, to get the prize. It was a big scandal and Ángeles Fernández was "discovered". Ángeles took refuge in Alfonsa's residence in Cuéllar, where she spent most of her life secluded from the rest of the world, until Alfonsa's death. It can be seen in: Besa Recasens (2008, pp. 132–133)) who then lived in seclusion for half a century in the estate that Alfonsa owned on the outskirts of Cuéllar.

After some turbulent negotiations beginning in 1993, the City Council of Cuéllar managed to acquire the property in 1998, carrying out a first intervention in 1999. In 2002, and through the Junta of Castile and León, by means of an agreement between the City Council of Cuéllar (40%) and the INCYDE Foundation (60%), together with the Chamber of Commerce of Segovia, and with a final budget of 650,910 euros, the final restoration of the palace is carried out, to inaugurate it in 2005 as a Business Incubator of Cuéllar, aimed at young entrepreneurs. It also offers a Hall of Multiple Activities, for cultural purposes.

== Peter I of Castilla ==
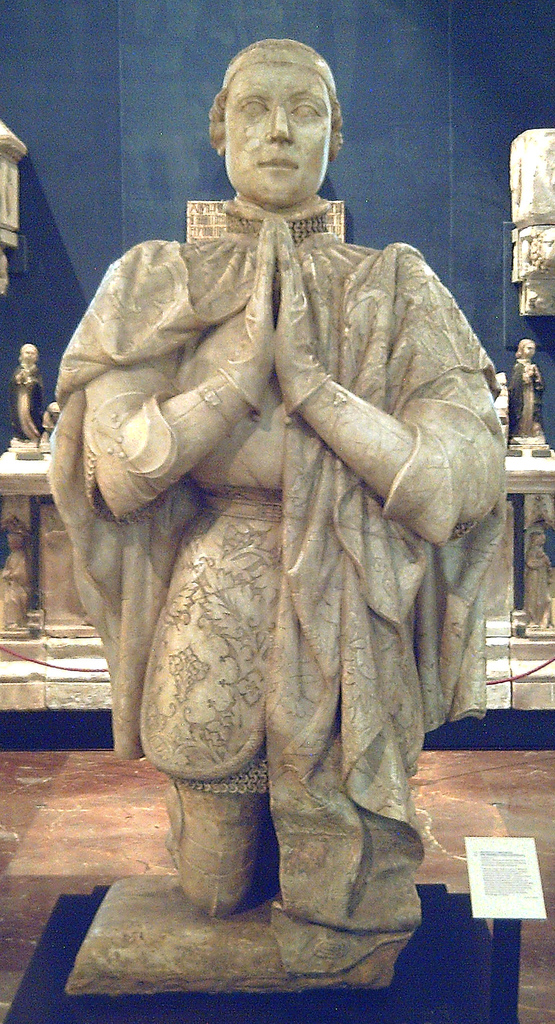
Statue of Peter I.

A fact that motivated the current name of the palace, was the linking history that Peter I of Castile has with the building and his love affairs.

After the disagreements that arose between the marriage of Peter I with Doña Blanche of Bourbon, the king forced the bishops of Ávila and Salamanca by means of violence to annul his marriage with Doña Blanca, to marry again with Doña Juana de Castro y Ponce de León, a widowed woman of noble lineage.

The marriage was celebrated in April 1354 in the Church of St. Martin of Cuéllar, and the ceremony was officiated by the bishop of Salamanca, Juan Lucero, celebrating the subsequent wedding banquet in the building because it was the one with the most appropriate characteristics.

The King's new marriage did not last long since the later chroniclers assure that the day after the marriage the king abandoned Doña Juana de Castro to go to Castrojeriz, after an envoy arrived in Cuéllar with alarming news regarding a brother of María de Padilla, another of his lovers. Even so, the new bride took the title of queen, which she used throughout her life, against the king's will, from her castle on Dueñas, which was part of the dowry she obtained, together with the Castle of Castrojeriz and the Alcázar of Jaén.

== Description ==
The palace is located in the vicinity of the Calle del Colegio, which joins the Main Square with the one on the Bread Market, and therefore in the heart of the historic center of the town. It belongs to romanesque art and is considered by many historians as "the remains of the best civil palace preserved in Spain", since very few examples of this period have survived the passage of time.

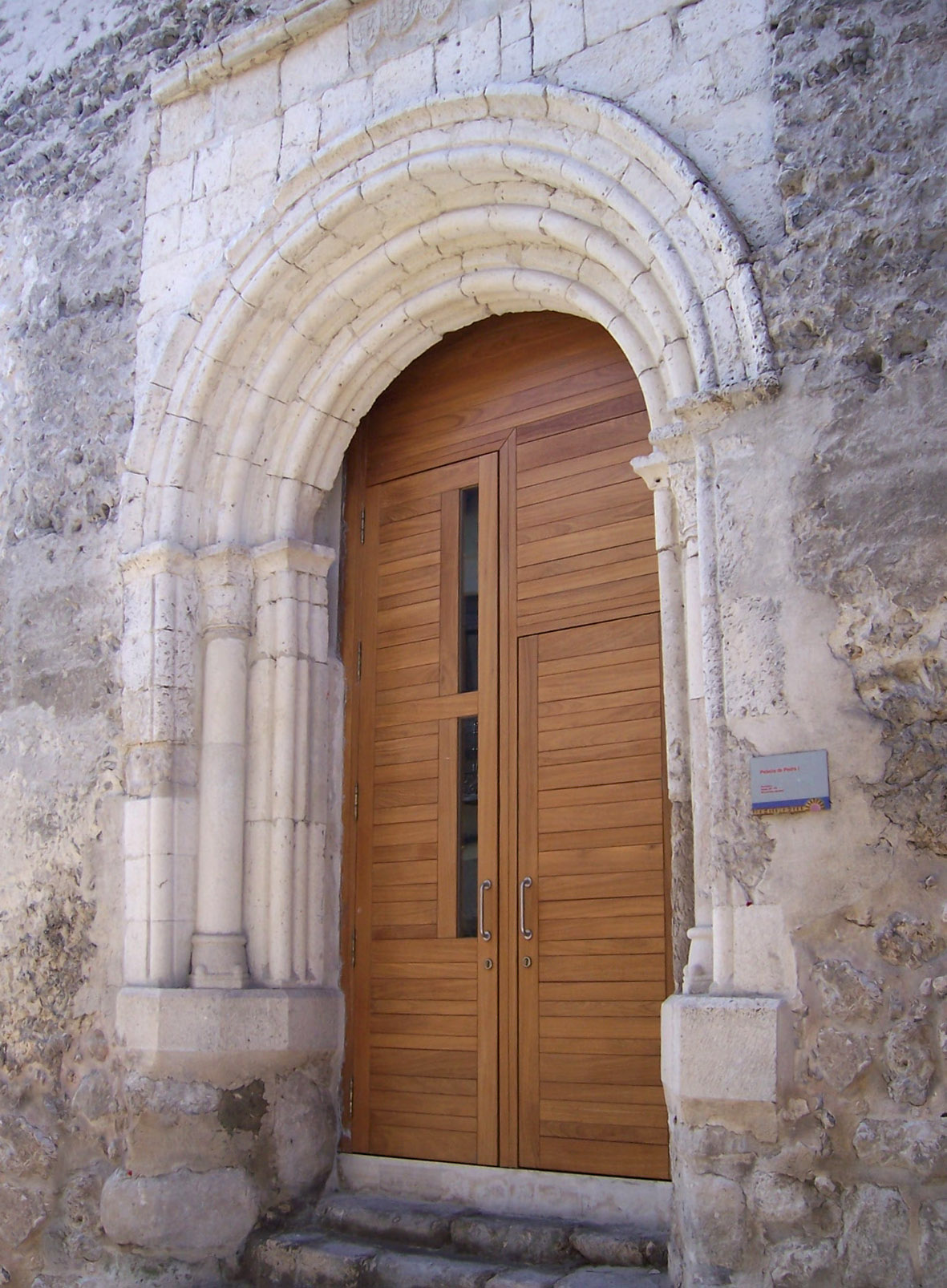
Romanesque facade.

=== Outside ===
To help with the visualization of the original structure, a description made in 1662 gives a glimpse of what the building was like in its best years:

This house has two towers, large walls of ashlar and masonry and the main room has its main doorway of ashlar stone with three columns on each side, and ends in an arch, and above the first cornice there are three small targets, as of half a rod: the one in the middle and those of the sides as of a third and in the one in the middle there are thirteen roels that are carved in stone, which are the arms of the Velázquez and on the right side on the other card there are five fleurs-de-lis that are the arms of the Xixones, and to the left side on the other card that as the past ones is of stone there are five castles and a vaston that divides the quarteles crosses it and near the tower there are two shields above a pillar that divides the quarteles and near the tower there are two shields above a pillar that divides two narrow windows and in it there are other two shields of the same size, one with the arms of the Velázquez and another with those of the Salinas. The tower that is to the right is unguarded and ruined and the one that is to the left side of the door is a strong tower, guarded and with square of weapons and has its diverse windows with its stone columns.

— Jesús Larios Martín, Nobiliario de Segovia, Volume II, p. 504.

Currently, it is preserved with another structure different from the original, because as the description points out, it had two towers, one on each side, and a small walled enclosure, perhaps because it was for a time a manor different from the rest of the town.

One of the towers, possibly the left one, has disappeared without a trace, although the description maintains that it was the right one that was in ruins in the 17th century. The wall that would have surrounded the complex is also missing, although recent excavations have brought to light the remains of a previously unknown wall in the vicinity of the palace.

The building consists of two main floors, plus the floor into which the tower is divided. The upper windows of the three facades are double and twinned, with semicircular arches and mullion composed of a small column that carries a capital with plant motifs.

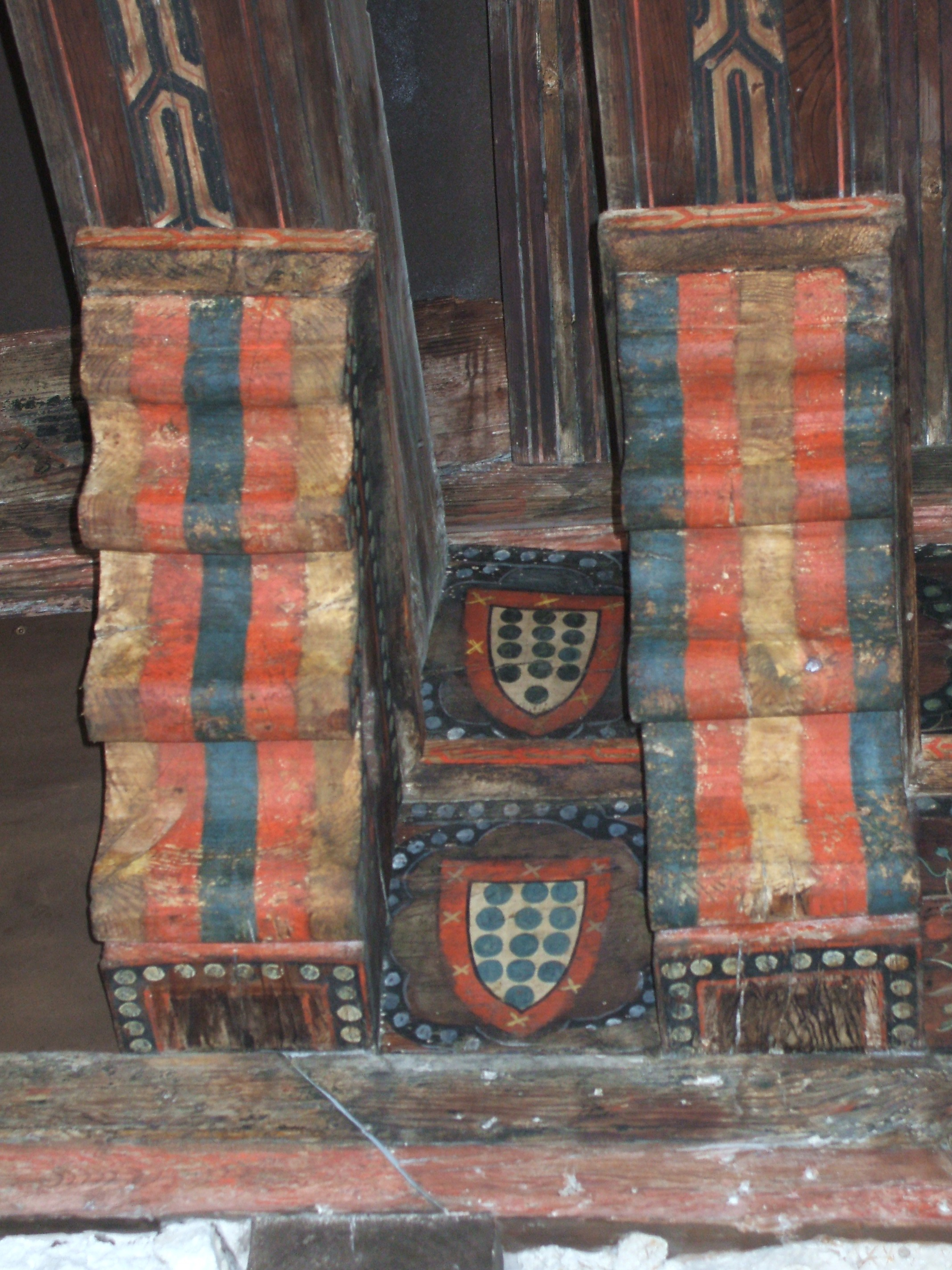
Heraldic detail of the polychrome coffered ceiling of the Main Room.

=== Heraldry ===
With a wide stone facade, the facade is centered on a semicircular arch with archivolts and columns, adorned with capitals with serpents. Above the arch there are three heraldic coats of arms, which seen from the left represent the arms of: Velázquez, Gijón and Velasco. The first of them corresponds to the owner's family, and the other two to matrimonial connections of the same; the last of them belongs to María de Velasco y Guevara, niece of Pedro Fernández de Velasco, VI Constable of Castile, II Count of Haro.

The 1662 description indicates at least five more heraldic pieces, which have not survived to the present day. In the interior of the palace two more heraldic pieces sculpted in stone can be found, as well as about a hundred coats of arms that form part of the polychromies, repeating over and over again the arms of Velázquez and Velasco. Therefore, the armorial of the palace would be the following:

- Velázquez: in a silver field, thirteen azure roundels. Border of gules with eight golden blades.
- Velasco: checkered of fifteen pieces of gold and veros, without the traditional bordure composed of Castile and León, crossed by a cane.
- Gijon: in a field of azure, five fleurs-de-lis of gold placed in sotuer.
- Salinas: silver field with an oak tree of the same color and two wolves walking, sable, at the foot of the trunk. Bordure of gules with eight sable blades.

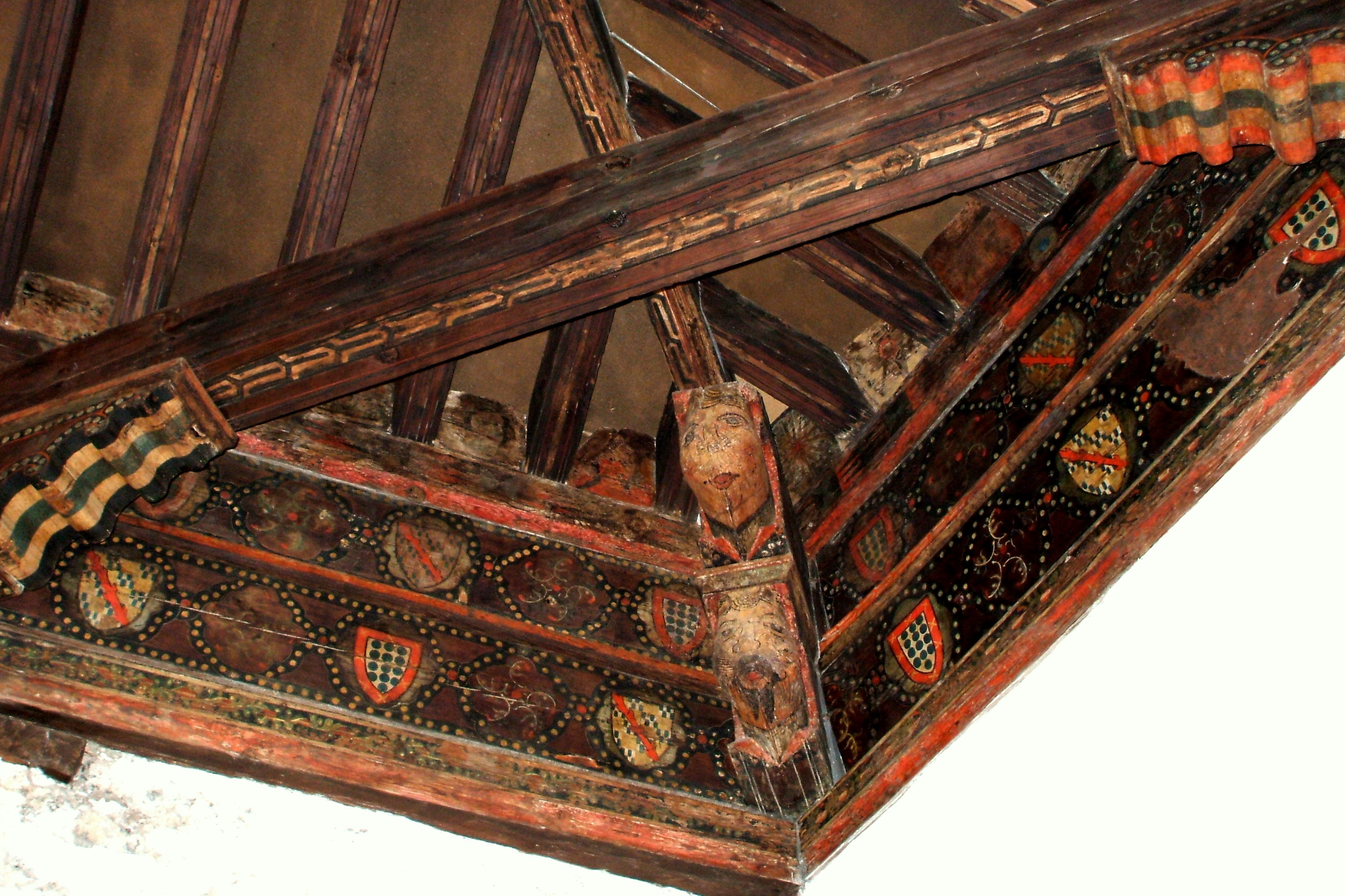
Polychrome coffered ceiling of the Main Hall.

=== Inside ===
In the lower part there are two large rooms, separated from each other by a wall that preserves a well-made stone doorway. In front of the main door we contemplate another facade embedded in the palace, which has another semicircular arch with archivolts and columns, and on it two small shields, similar to those of the main facade, but in this case totally chopped, without being able to decipher the arms that contained, which presumably were Velázquez and Velasco. This secondary door leads to a large garden. Before going out to the garden, on the left side, the well that supplied water to the palace is preserved, and in the upper part, there are remains of the chimney that heated the room in the coldest days of winter.

On the second floor there is the main hall, the noblest part of the palace, which also preserves the remains of the fireplace, as well as stone benches next to the main windows, and a niche with geometric decoration. Next to the entrance door is the staircase to the tower, with straight lines along the wall.

The top floor, illuminated by four large windows, offers a 360º view of the villa, with the sea of pine trees in the background.

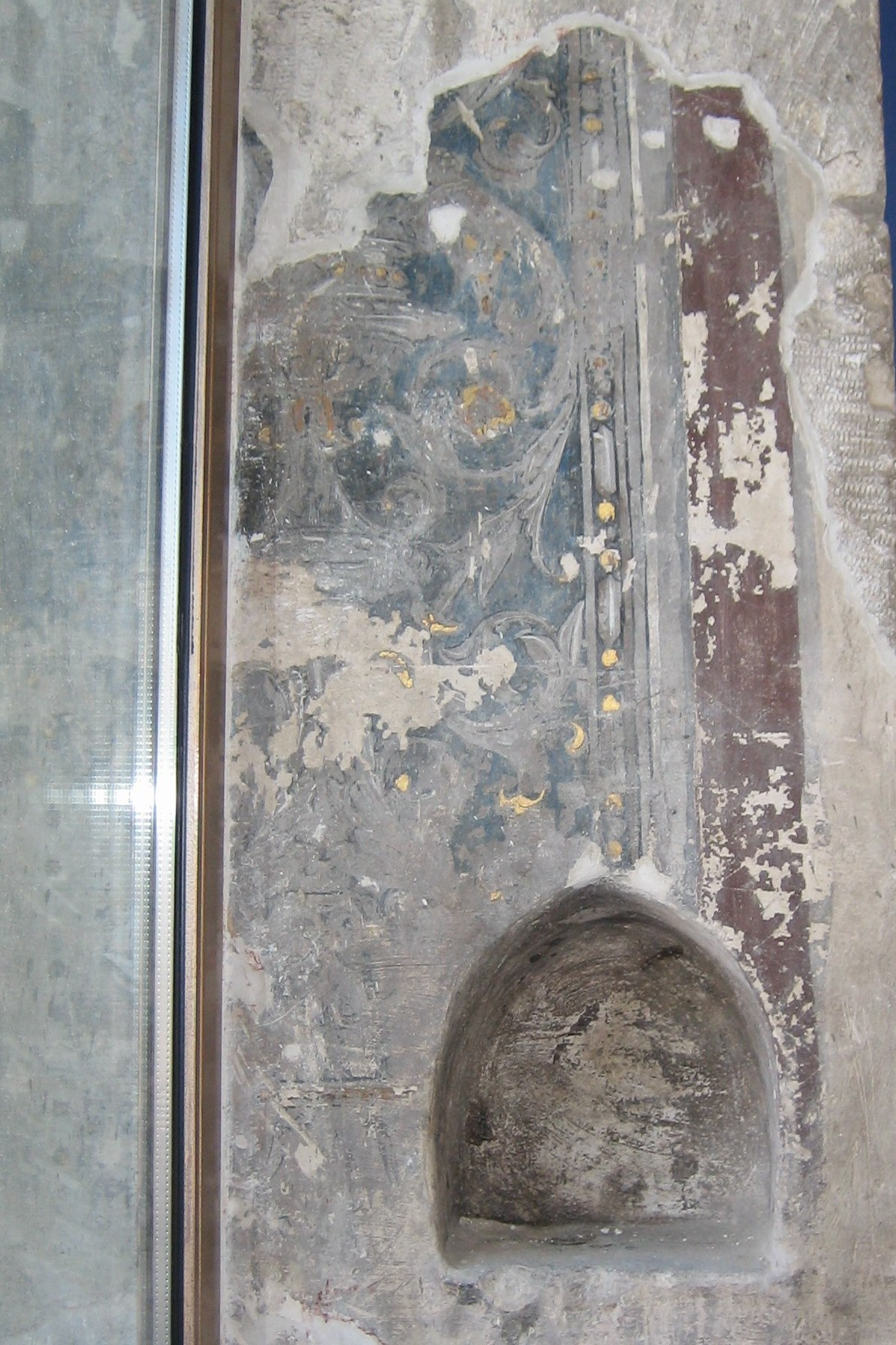
Detail of the polychrome of the walls of the Main Hall.

=== Polychrome ===
In the main hall on the second floor, small polychromes are preserved in the wooden coffered ceiling, while in the main hall, on the second floor, the remains of a splendid polychrome and carved coffered ceiling are preserved, which was restored in 2006 through an agreement between the Junta of Castile and León and the City Council of Cuéllar, with a budget of 81,996 euros at 50% each.

The restoration has uncovered remains of geometric decoration, intermingled with the coats of arms of Velázquez and Velasco, as well as carved wooden heads finishing off the corners of the ceiling.

From the coats of arms drawn and the style of painting, we can attribute the promoters of the decoration of the coffered ceiling to Juan Velázquez de Cuéllar, the major accountant of Castile and faithful servant of the Catholic Monarchs, and his wife, the aforementioned María de Velasco y Guevara. Juan Velázquez, an important figure in the reign of these monarchs, was the first lord of Villavaquerín and La Sinova, commander of Membrilla in the Order of Santiago. He was a page, Continuo knight and of the Council of Isabella the Catholic, and together with his wife, the breeders of St. Ignatius of Loyola in Arévalo, a town that he defended with great zeal at the death of Ferdinand the Catholic, as he was warden and governor of that town as well as of those of Trujillo, Olmedo and Madrigal de las Altas Torres. His name appears on the tomb of Prince John, as he was his Chief Accountant, Head Waiter, Chamberlain and one of his executors.

There are also heraldic polychromes on the staircase leading up to the tower, and details of mural frescoes in one of the rooms on the second floor, which allow us to imagine the decoration that once supported the walls.

== See also ==
- Peter of Castile

== Bibliography ==
- De la Torre de Trassierra, Gonzalo (1894). Cuéllar. Madrid: Establecimiento Tipográfico de Agustin Avrial.
- Herrera Mesón, Jorge (2006). "Velázquez, un apellido originario de Cuéllar". La Villa.
- Larios Martín, Jesús (1957). Nobiliario de Segovia. Consejo Superior de Investigaciones Cientificas.
- Ubieto Arteta, Antonio (1961). Colección Diplomática de Cuéllar. Diputación Provincial de Segovia.
- Velasco Bayón, Balbino (1981). Historia de Cuéllar (1st ed.). Diputación Provincial de Segovia. ISBN 978-8450046205.
- Various Authors (2008). El Palacio de Pedro el Cruel. Segovia.
