= Julio Valdeón Baruque =

Spanish historian

Julio Valdeón Baruque (Olmedo, Province of Valladolid, 21 July 1936 - Valladolid, 21 June 2009) was a historian of Spain.

== Life and career ==
He studied at the University of Valladolid, earning a degree in History, and subsequently earning a PhD. Enter 1967 and 1971 was associated professor Medieval History of Universidad Complutense de Madrid. He became a professor in that subject, serving in 1971 and 1973 in the University of Seville. From 1973 he was professor of Medieval History at the University of Valladolid. Enter 1981 and 1984 was dean of the Faculty of Arts of the University and later served as director of its Department of Medieval History. Under his tutelage was formed a generation of prestigious medievalists, including María Isabel del Val, Juan Carlos Martín Cea, Asunción Esteban Recio, Ángel Martínez Casado and Juan Antonio Bonachía Hernando.

He was a founding member and chairman of the editorial Ambito, a member of the editorial board of Spanish newspaper El Mundo century, and a member of the advisory board of the journal Historia16.

In 1994, he was curator of the exhibition El testamento de Adán. In July 2002, he was appointed director of the Institute of History of Simancas. On November 16, 2001, he was elected a full member of the Real Academia de la Historia, to fill the vacancy left by Pedro Lain Entralgo, entering the same in June 2002.

He was one of the largest and most prestigious specialists from Spain in the late medieval period in the Crown of Castile.

He is father of the novelist Julio Valdeón Blanco.

He died in Valladolid on 21 June 2009.

== Awards ==
In February 2002 he received the honor of Castile and León Award for Social Sciences and Humanities "in recognition of research work on the medieval past, and permanent teachers and generous disposition".

In 2004 he received the National History Award of Spain for his work Alfonso X: la forja de la España moderna. (ISBN 84-8460-277-X)

== Works ==
- (ISBN 84-8448-287-1) La muerte y el más allá: Edad Media n.º 6 Universidad de Valladolid. Secretariado de Publicaciones e Intercambio Editorial, 2004.
- (ISBN 84-207-3368-7) La Alta Edad MediaGrupo Anaya, S.A., 2003.
- (ISBN 84-9739-002-4) La España medieval Actas, S.L., 2003.
- (ISBN 84-8460-277-X) Alfonso X: la forja de la España moderna Ediciones Temas de Hoy, S.A., 2003.
- (ISBN 84-8448-214-6) El retorno de la biografía : Edad Media nº 5 Universidad de Valladolid. Secretariado de Publicaciones e Intercambio Editorial, 2002.
- (ISBN 84-8448-132-8) Contestación social y mundo campesino: edad media Universidad de Valladolid. Secretariado de Publicaciones e Intercambio Editorial, 2002.
- (ISBN 84-8432-300-5) Historia de las Españas medievales (Et al.) Editorial Crítica, 2002.
- (ISBN 84-8450-996-6) Abderramán III y el Califato de Córdoba Nuevas Ediciones de Bolsillo, 2002.
- (ISBN 84-03-09331-4) Pedro I, el Cruel y Enrique de Trastamara Aguilar, S.A. de Ediciones-Grupo Santillana, 2002.
- (ISBN 84-8448-168-9) España y el "Sacro Imperio: procesos de cambios, influencias y acciones recíprocas en la época de la "europeización" (siglos XI-XIII) Universidad de Valladolid. Secretariado de Publicaciones e Intercambio Editorial, 2002.
- (ISBN 84-8460-129-3) Los trastámaras Ediciones Temas de Hoy, S.A., 2001.
- (ISBN 84-8306-437-5) Abderramán III y el Califato de Córdoba Editorial Debate, 2001.
- (ISBN 84-8448-043-7) Judíos y conversos en la Castilla medieval Universidad de Valladolid. Secretariado de Publicaciones e Intercambio Editorial, 2000.
- (ISBN 84-8165-643-7) El Camino de Santiago en coche (Et al.) Anaya-Touring Club, 1999.
- (ISBN 84-207-3814-X) La Baja Edad Media Grupo Anaya, S.A., 1998.
- (ISBN 84-8165-554-6) El Camino de Santiago (Et al.) Anaya-Touring Club, 1998.
- (ISBN 84-8173-051-3) Enrique II Diputación Provincial de Palencia, 1996.
- (ISBN 84-7679-288-3) La apertura de Castilla al Atlántico : de Alfonso X a los Reyes Católicos Historia 16. Historia Viva, 1995. [Parte de obra completa: T.10]
- (ISBN 84-8183-007-0) Judíos, sefarditas, conversos: la expulsión de 1492 y sus consecuencias (Et al.) Ámbito Ediciones, S.A., 1995.
- (ISBN 84-86770-95-5) Historia de Castilla y León Ámbito Ediciones, S.A., 1993.
- (ISBN 84-7679-220-4) El feudalismo Historia 16. Historia Viva, 1992.
- (ISBN 84-7662-039-X) Edad Media (Et al.) Ediciones Universitarias Nájera, 1990.
- (ISBN 84-87119-05-0) Lugares de celebración de Cortes de Castilla y León Castilla y León. Cortes, 1990.
- (ISBN 84-7525-482-9) La alta edad media Ediciones Generales Anaya, S.A., 1988.
- (ISBN 84-7525-444-6) La baja edad media Ediciones Generales Anaya, S.A., 1988.
- (ISBN 84-86770-14-9) En defensa de la historia Ámbito Ediciones, S.A., 1988.
- (ISBN 84-7461-666-2) Plenitud del Medievo (Et al.) S.A. de Promoción y Ediciones, 1986. [Parte de obra completa: T.12]
- (ISBN 84-7461-667-0) Declive de de la Edad Media S.A. de Promoción y Ediciones, 1986. [Parte de obra completa: T.13]
- (ISBN 84-7662-013-6) Gran Historia Universal. 13. Declive de la Edad Media (Et al.) Ediciones Universitarias Nájera, 1986.
- (ISBN 84-7662-011-X) La Gran Historia Universal. 11. Principios de la Edad Media (Et al.) Ediciones Universitarias Nájera, 1986.
- (ISBN 84-7662-012-8) La Gran Historia Universal. 12. Plenitud del medievo (Et al.) Ediciones Universitarias Nájera, 1986.
- (ISBN 84-505-3366-X) Alfonso X el Sabio Castilla y León. Consejería de Educación y Cultura, 1986.
- (ISBN 84-323-0188-4) Conflictos sociales en el reino de Castilla en los siglos XIV y XV Siglo XXI de España Editores, S.A., 1986.
- (ISBN 84-86047-65-X) Historia de Castilla y León. 5: Crisis y recuperación: s. XIV-XV Ámbito Ediciones, S.A., 1986.
- (ISBN 84-86047-67-6) La época del auge. (ss. XIV-XVI) (Et al.) Ámbito Ediciones, S.A., 1986.
- (ISBN 84-86047-44-7) Historia de Castilla y León Ámbito Ediciones, S.A., 1985.
- (ISBN 84-86047-54-4) Crisis y recuperación (siglos XIV-XV) Ámbito Ediciones, S.A., 1985. [Parte de obra completa: T.5]
- (ISBN 84-86047-00-5) Aproximación histórica a Castilla y León Ámbito Ediciones, S.A., 1985.
- (ISBN 84-85432-69-X) Historia general de la Baja Edad Media Ediciones Universitarias Nájera, 1984.
- (ISBN 84-500-9692-8) Burgos en la Edad Media (Et al.) Castilla y León. Consejería de Educación y Cultura, 1983.
- (ISBN 84-7465-046-1) Iniciación a la historia de Castilla y León (Et al.) Nuestra Cultura Editorial, 1982.
- (ISBN 84-300-3064-6) Iniciación a la historia de Castilla-León Colegio Oficial de Doctores y Licenciados en Filosofía y Letras y en Ciencias de Burgos, 1980.
- (ISBN 84-7105-007-2) Historia general de la Edad Media (Siglos XI al XV) Mayfe, S.A., 1971.
- (ISBN 84-00-02380-3) Los judíos de Castilla y la revolución Trastámara Consejo Superior de Investigaciones Científicas, 1968.
- (ISBN 84-7113-056-4) El Reino de Castilla en la Edad Media International Book Creation, 1968.
- (ISBN 84-335-9424-9) Feudalismo y consolidación de los pueblos hispánicos (siglos XI-XV) (Et al.) Editorial Labor, S.A. [Parte de obra completa: T.4]
- (ISBN 84-239-8904-6) La Baja Edad Media peninsular, siglos XIII al XV (Et al.) Espasa-Calpe, S.A. [Parte de obra completa: T.12]
- (ISBN 84-8183-136-0) Las raíces medievales de Castilla y León Ámbito Edicionsa, S.A., 2004.
