= Monastery of the Mother of God (Olmedo) =

Dominican monastery in Spain

The Monastery of the Mother of God is a convent of Dominican nuns sited in Olmedo, Valladolid Province, Spain. It was founded in 1528 as a beaterio (beguinage), under the title of Sta. Catalina, under the protection of Doña Francisca de Zuñiga, abbess of San Paio, Santiago.

== History ==
The monastery was seized in the Ecclesiastical confiscations of Mendizabal. Despite a government ban, it remained active in the figure of the Mother Prioress Isabel de Garcimartín, who together with three novices kept it until 1868. Although the monastery returned to its religious status in 1868, it was less height reaching and was on the verge of disappearance in later years.

In the 1950s, the monastery sought help from the community of Dominican Sisters of Daroca (Zaragoza), which sent them three nuns to continue religious work (including sister Teresita del Niño Jesús Pérez de Iriarte). The present building dates from the seventeenth century, and was rebuilt in the nineteenth century.

== Publications ==
The Monastery has made several publications of books written by Mother Teresa M. de Jesús Ortega.

- "Historia de un Sí", COLECCIÓN VIDA RELIGIOSA, Nº 19. EDITORIAL COCULSA. 2ª ED. MADRID, 1963. (translated into Italian and Chinese).
- "Sí a nuestros compromisos" (translated into English).
- "Sí, Dios".
- "¿Qué dijo Dios al volver?" (sobre Sta. Catalina de Siena).
- "Canto rodado" (vida de Madre Teresa M. Ortega) by D. Baldomero Jiménez Duque.
- Trigo de su era: 1738 pensamientos desde la vivencia de la fe, Edibesa, 2003.ISBN 84-8407-412-9.
