= Remondo =

- Municipality
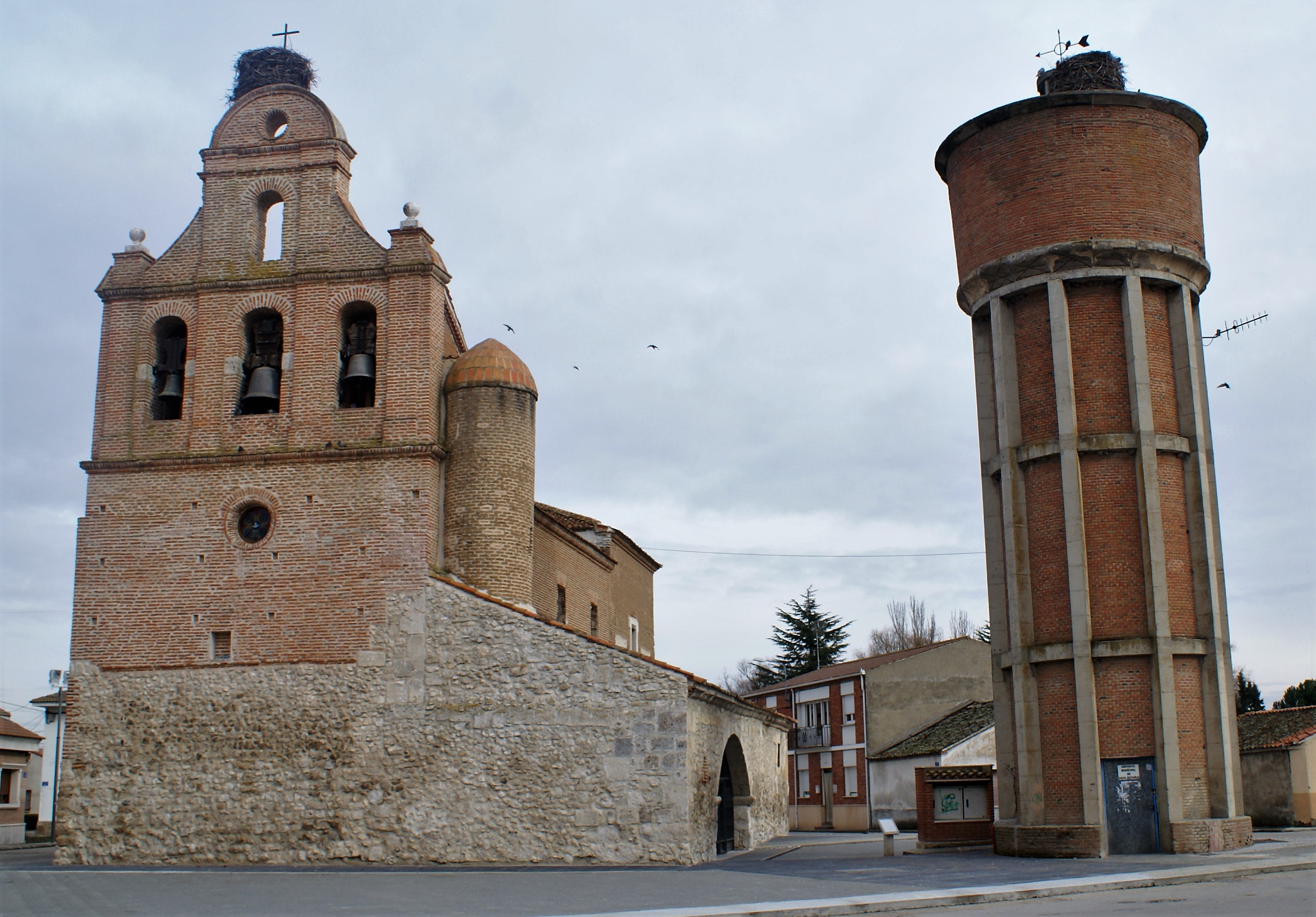
- Church and water deposit in Remondo, Segovia, Spain.

- Location in Spain. Remondo (Spain)
- Coordinates: 41°20′30″N 4°29′00″W
- Country: Spain
- Autonomous community: Castile and León
- Province: Segovia
- Municipality: Remondo

Area
  - Total: 8 km^{2} (3.1 sq mi)

Population (2025-01-01)
  - Total: 329
  - Density: 41/km^{2} (110/sq mi)
- Time zone: UTC+1 (CET)
  - Summer (DST): UTC+2 (CEST)
- Website: Official website

Remondo is a municipality located in the province of Segovia, Castile and León, Spain. According to the 2004 census (INE), the municipality has a population of 332 inhabitants.
