= Cohen & Gresser =

U.S.-based international law firm

Cohen & Gresser LLP
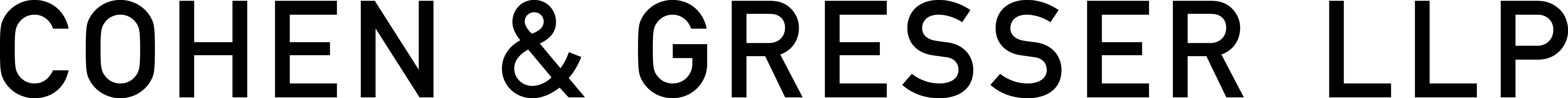
- Headquarters: New York City
- No. of offices: 5
- Offices: New York City; Washington, DC; London; Dubai; Paris
- Major practice areas: Corporate law
- Date founded: 2002
- Founder: Mark Cohen, Lawrence Gresser, Managing partner
- Website: cohengresser.com

Cohen & Gresser LLP is a law firm based in New York City that represents clients in litigation and corporate transactions throughout the world. The firm was founded in 2002 by Lawrence Gresser and Mark Cohen.

In November 2025, Cohen & Gresser was reported as the first U.S. law firm to enter negotiations with private equity interests to reshape its practice with a management service organization (MSO).

== Lawyers ==
Some of the firm's attorneys have served as former prosecutors, including former Assistant U.S. Attorneys for the Southern and Eastern Districts of New York. Some also serve as adjunct professors in nearby law schools.

Partner Miriam González Durántez relocated from Europe to Silicon Valley and joined the firm as co-chair of its International Trade and Government Regulation practice in 2019.

Partner Christian Everdell joined the firm in 2017, and was previously assistant U.S. attorney, for the office of the U.S. Attorney in Manhattan, where he received the Federal Drug Agents Foundation "American Hero Award" in 2014 for his work on the case against Mexican drug kingpin Joaquin "El Chapo" Guzman.

In 2023, London managing partner Jeffrey Bronheim was removed and investigated amid sexual harassment allegations. He was succeeded by Daniel Mathias.

== Clients ==
Partner Christian Everdell defended Ghislaine Maxwell in 2021 when she was charged as an accomplice of Jeffrey Epstein in abusing minors.

In 2022, former FTX CEO Sam Bankman-Fried was represented by firm co-founder Mark Cohen and partner Everdell, each of whom previously worked for offices of the U.S. Attorney in New York, in a federal probe of the cryptocurrency exchange's collapse.
