= Pedro de Bolduque =

Spanish sculptor

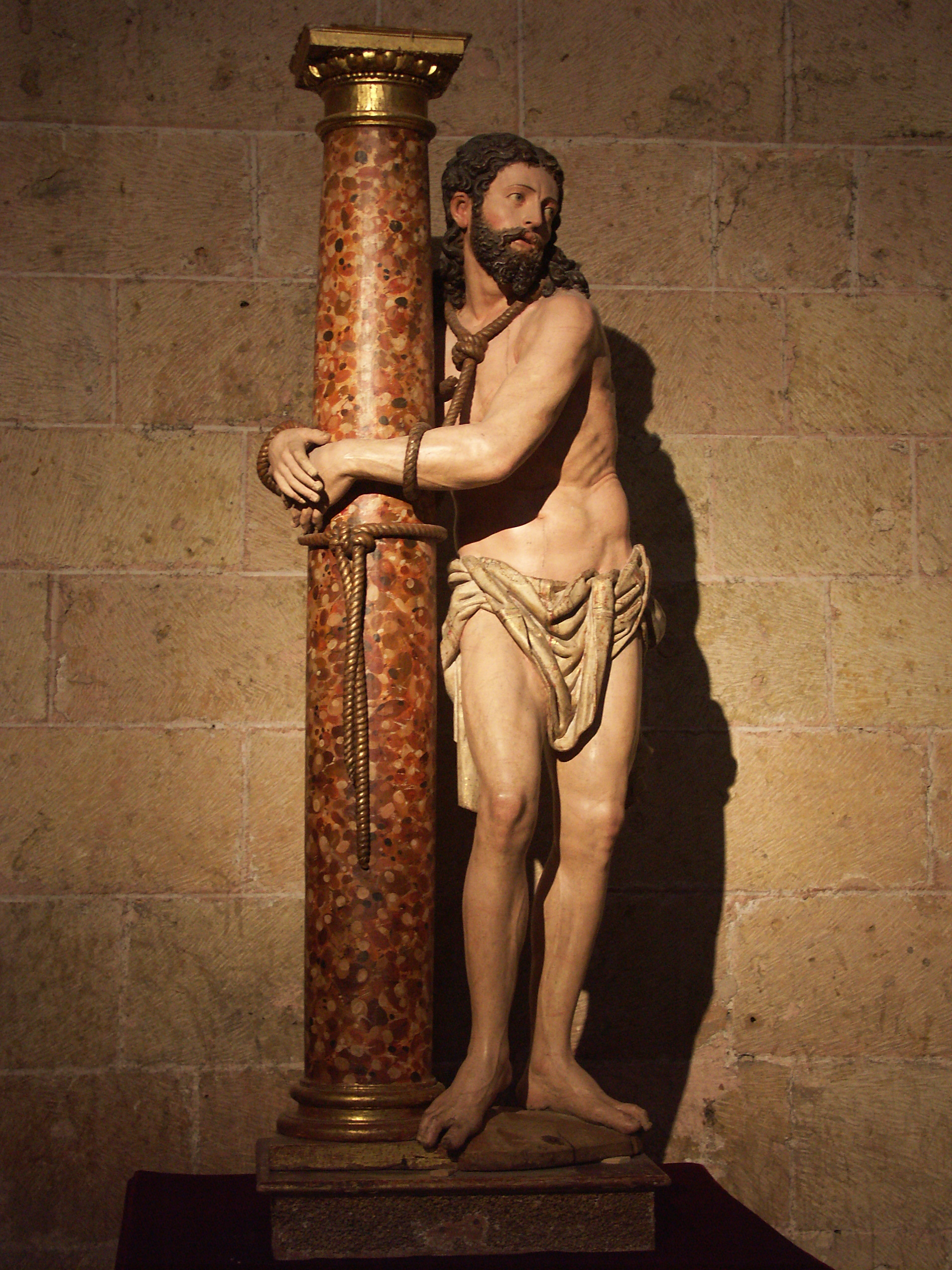
Image of Christ to the column, belonging to the altarpiece of San Pedro, Segovia Cathedral

Pedro de Bolduque, (c. 1550 – c. 1595) was a Spanish sculptor of Flemish origin who lived and worked mainly in Medina de Rio Seco and Cuéllar.

He was born in Medina de Rio Seco into a family of artists of Flemish descent, probably from the town of 's-Hertogenbosch, dedicated to carving and assembly, and his brothers were also sculptors.

He began his career heavily influenced by Juan de Juni, Gaspar Becerra and Esteban Jordan, who had worked in Medina de Rio Seco, so his work is considered a stylistic continuation of them. He moved to Cuellar in 1580, where he opened a workshop and married Ana Velazquez, with whom he had two children.

In Cuéllar, Pedro formed a very close professional relationship with the Maldonado Family (Julian and Gabriel), local painters who worked in much of the province of Segovia and the closest areas of Valladolid. He returned to Medina de Rio Seco where he died in 1595. His brothers and nephews continued the sculpting business. The sculptures thereafter were painted and decorated by the Maldonado family.
