= Olmedo, Valladolid =

Olmedo
- Municipality
- Olmedo
- Coat of arms

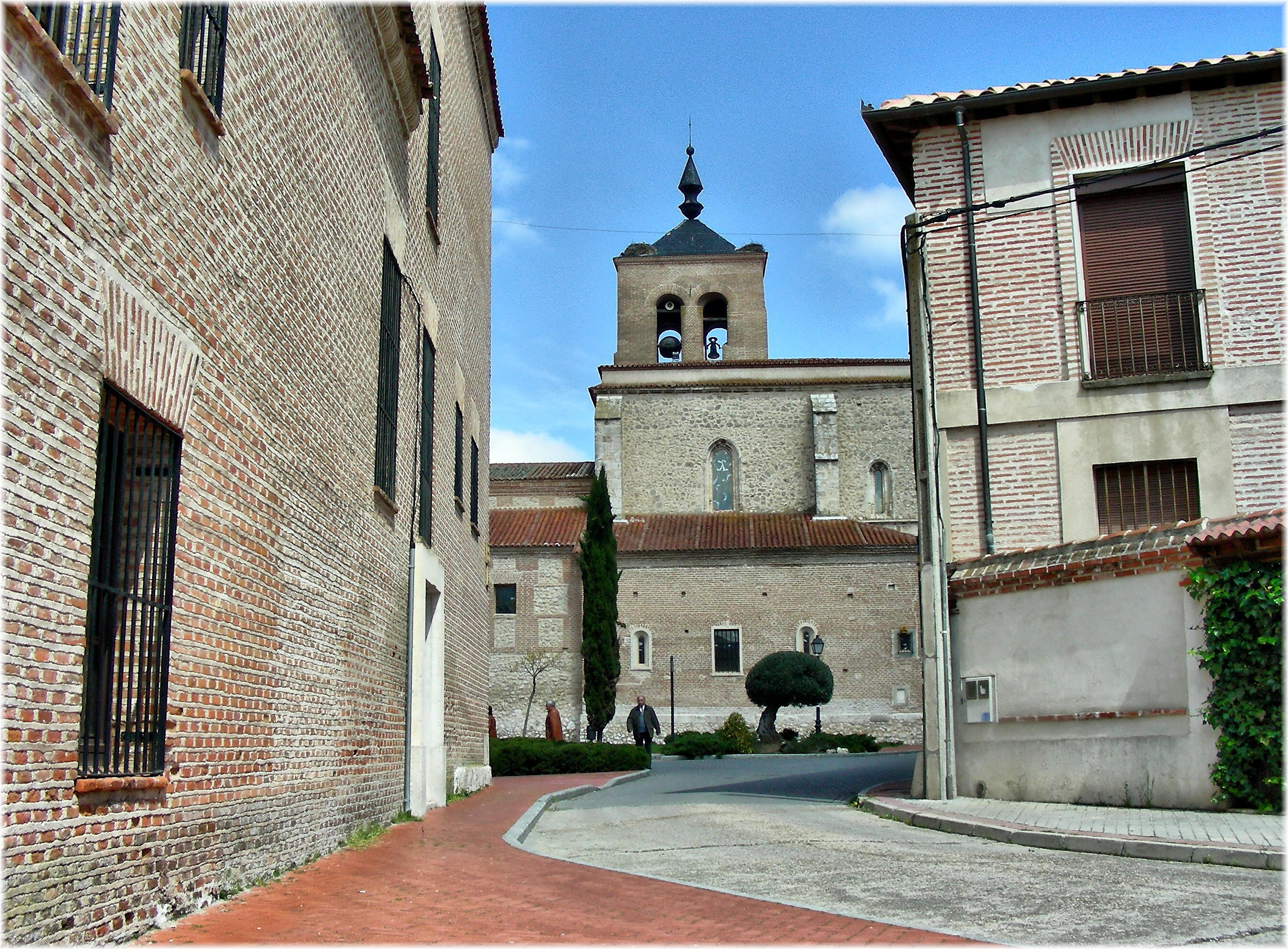

- Location in Spain
- Coordinates: 41°17′20″N 4°41′00″W
- Country: Spain
- Autonomous community: Castile and León
- Province: Valladolid
- Comarca: Tierra de Pinares

Government
  - Alcalde: Alfonso Ángel Centeno Trigos (PP)

Area
  - Total: 129.38 km^{2} (49.95 sq mi)
- Elevation: 740 m (2,430 ft)

Population (2025-01-01)
  - Total: 3,592
  - Density: 27.76/km^{2} (71.91/sq mi)
- Time zone: UTC+1 (CET)
  - Summer (DST): UTC+2 (CEST)
- Postal code: 47410
- Official language(s): Spanish
- Website: www.olmedo.es

Olmedo is a municipality in the province of Valladolid, Spain. The Mudéjar theme park is located here.

== History ==
Historically, there was a Jewish community in Olmedo in the Middle Ages, up until the 1492 expulsion of the Jews.

== Museums ==
- Palacio Caballero de Olmedo.
- Parque temático del Mudéjar de Castilla y León.

== Transport ==
Olmedo is on the N-601 road (Adanero-Olmedo-Valladolid–Medina de Rioseco–León).

The Madrid–Valladolid high-speed rail line runs through the municipality, and Olmedo is planned to be the branching point for the high-speed line running to Zamora and Galicia.

Olmedo is at one end of a 14.4km test track for high speed trains, and the Talgo gauge changer system. Medina del Campo is at the other end.

== Gastronomy ==
- Cuisine of the province of Valladolid

== Notable people ==
- Brother Bartolomé de Olmedo, advisor to Hernán Cortés;
- Alonso de Zuazo (1466–1539), judge and governor of New Spain;
- Juan Jiménez de Montalvo (1551–?), judge of the Royal Audiencia of Lima (1598–?) and acting Viceroy of Peru (1621–22);
- Jerónimo de Alderete (1516–56), conqueror of Chile;
- Julio Valdeón Baruque (1936–2009), historian;
- José Antonio González Caviedes (1938–1996), mayor of Olmedo and Senator for the UPD and later for the Popular Party
- Miriam González Durántez (1968–), lawyer, wife of Nick Clegg (Deputy Prime Minister of the United Kingdom 2010–15), daughter of José Antonio González Caviedes.
