= List of sites of the Dominican Order =

Monasteries and other sites of the Dominican Order can be found in numerous countries around the world. This incomplete list is ordered geographically using contemporary country boundaries, which often differ from historical order, and to the extent possible, chronological order of Dominican affiliation within each country. Dates of affiliation with the Order are indicated in parentheses.

== Europe ==
=== Austria ===
- Convent of Saint Nicholas in Friesach (since 1217)
- Dominikanerinnenkloster Lienz in Lienz (since 1218)
- Dominican Monastery in Wiener Neustadt (1227-1444), later Stift Neukloster
- Dominikanerkirche Krems in Krems an der Donau (1236-1786)
- Dominikanerkonvent (Wien) and Dominican Church in Vienna (since 1237)
- St. Peter an der Sperr in Wiener Neustadt (c.1240s-1544)
- Kirche St. Andrä (Graz) in Graz (c.1270-1783)
- Convent of St. Peter in Bludenz (since 1286, with interruptions)
- Grazer Stadtpfarrkirche in Graz (14th century-1585)
- Kloster Thalbach in Bregenz (1436-1782)
- Dominican Friary in Steyr (1472-1865), now Marienkirche (Steyr)
- Dominikanerinnenkloster Feldkirch in Feldkirch, Vorarlberg (since 1551)
- Dominikanerkloster Münzbach in Münzbach (1661-1784)
- Dominikanerinnenkloster Windhaag in Windhaag bei Perg (1664-1782), now Pfarrkirche Windhaag
- Dominican Nunnery in Vienna (since 1870)
- Marienberg Abbey in Bregenz (since 1904)
- Kloster Hilariberg in Kramsach (1971-2010)

=== Belgium ===
- Couvent des dominicains de Gand in Ghent (1220-1796)
- Dominican friary in Bruges (1234-1796)
- St. Paul's Church in Antwerp (1276-1802, with interruption 1578–1584)
- Église Saint-Dominique de Bruxelles in Brussels (since 1901)
- Abbaye du Saulchoir in Tournai (1904-1939), original location of Le Saulchoir theological school

=== Bosnia and Herzegovina ===
- Fethija Mosque in Bihać (1266-1592)

=== Croatia ===
- Dominican Friary in Dubrovnik (1225-19th century?)
- Church of Saint Peter in Stari Grad, Hvar (1479-1571)

=== Czechia ===
- Znaimer Dominikanerkloster in Znojmo (since c.1230s, with interruptions)
- Dominican Monastery in České Budějovice (1260s-1785)
- St. Catherine Monastery in Olomouc (1287-1782)
- Karmelitánský klášter (Tachov) in Tachov (1331-17th century)

=== Denmark ===
- Dominican Priory in Viborg (1227-1529)
- St. Catherine's Priory in Ribe (1228-1536)
- Our Lady's Priory in Aarhus (c.1230-1536)
- St. Catherine's Priory in Roskilde (1231-1537)
- St. Agnes' Priory in Roskilde (1264-1527)
- Holbæk Priory in Holbæk (1275-1535)
- St. Agnes' Priory in Gavnø (1398-1536)

=== Estonia ===
- St. Catherine's Monastery in Tallinn (1246-1524)

=== France ===
- Notre-Dame-de-Prouille Monastery in rural Aude (1206 or 1207-1793 and since 1856)
- Église Notre-Dame-de-Recouvrance d'Angers in Angers (1216-1790)
- Couvent des Jacobins de la rue Saint-Jacques in Paris (1218-1790)
- Dominican Convent in Strasbourg (1224-1531), now Temple Neuf
- Couvent des Prêcheurs d'Aix-en-Provence in Aix-en-Provence (1226-1790)
- Ensemble conventuel des Jacobins and Church of the Jacobins in Toulouse (1229-1791); burial place of Thomas Aquinas
- Couvent des Jacobins de Nantes in Nantes (c.1230-1790)
- Couvent des Unterlinden in Colmar (1232-1790), now Unterlinden Museum
- Église Saint-Paul de Valenciennes in Valenciennes (1233-1790)
- Église Notre-Dame-de-Confort in Lyon (1235-1790)
- Dominikanerkloster Avignon in Avignon (1241-1790)
- Couvent des Jacobins d'Auxerre in Auxerre (1245-1790)
- Couvent des Jacobins de Reims in Reims (1245-1790)
- Silos monastery in Sélestat (1245-1792)
- Couvent des Frères Prêcheurs (Perpignan) in Perpignan (c.1245-1793)
- Église des Jacobins d'Agen in Agen (1249-1790)
- Silos monastery near Ribeauvillé (1250-1790)
- Dominican convent in Colmar (1277-1790)
- Couvent des Jacobins in Saint-Sever (1280-1790)
- Dominican monastery in Aix-en-Provence (1290-1790)
- Couvent des dominicains de Collioure in Collioure (1290-1790)
- Couvent des Jacobins de Saintes in Saintes (1292-1790)
- Basilique Sainte-Marie-Madeleine de Saint-Maximin-la-Sainte-Baume in Saint-Maximin-la-Sainte-Baume (1295-1790)
- Couvent des Dominicaines de l'Isle in Pont-l'Évêque, Calvados (13th century?-1790)
- Couvent des Dominicains de Carpentras in Carpentras (1312-1790)
- Couvent des Frères Prêcheurs de Belvès in Belvès (1321-1790)
- Couvent des Jacobins (Rennes) in Rennes (1367-1793)
- Schoenensteinbach monastery in Wittenheim (1397-1790)
- Dominican Friary in Auch (15th century?-1790), now Musée des Jacobins
- Couvent des Jacobins (Laval) in Laval (1487-1790)
- Église Saint-Cannat in Marseille (1526-1790)
- Église Saint-Dominique de Vieux-Thann in Vieux-Thann (1534-1790)
- Couvent des Jacobins de la rue Saint-Honoré in Paris (1611-1790)
- Dominican novitiate on Rue Saint-Dominique in Paris (1631-1790), now CHurch of Saint-Thomas-d'Aquin
- Église Notre-Dame de Bordeaux in Bordeaux (1684-1790)
- Chapelle des Dominicains de Viviers in Viviers, Ardèche (1734-1790)
- Flavigny Abbey in Flavigny-sur-Ozerain (since the 1840s)
- Monastère de Chalais near Voreppe (1844-1887 and since 1963)
- Couvent Saint-Jacques in Paris (since 1849), home of Le Saulchoir theology school since 1971
- Kloster Corbara in Corbara, Haute-Corse (1856-1992, with interruption 1903–1927)
- Dominican Nuns of the Perpetual Rosary in Calais (since 1880)
- Église Saint-François-de-Paule de Nice in Nice (since 1939)
- Sainte Marie de La Tourette in Éveux near Lyon (since 1943)
- Monastère de Bouvines in Bouvines (1945-2003)
- Couvent des Dominicains de Lille in Lille (since 1952)
- Abbaye Notre-Dame de Boscodon in Crots (since 1972)
- Dominican Nunnery in Salernes (since 1980)
- Prieuré de la Haie-aux-Bonshommes in Avrillé, Maine-et-Loire (since 1982)

=== Germany ===
- Dominicans Island on Lake Constance (1220-1785)
- Dominikanerkloster Köln in Cologne (1221-1802)
- St. Katharinen (Halberstadt) in Halberstadt (1224-c.1800)
- Dominikanerkloster Magdeburg in Magdeburg (1224-1561)
- Dominikanerkloster Trier in Trier (c.1225-1802)
- Couvent dominicain de Worms at the Church of Saint Paul in Worms (1227-1797)
- Burgkloster (Lübeck) and Church of Mary Magdalene in Lübeck (1229-1806)
- Predigerkirche in Erfurt (1229-1588)
- Dominican Church of Saint Blasius in Regensburg (1229-1806)
- Dominikanerkloster Koblenz in Koblenz (c.1230-1802)
- Dominikanerkloster Soest in Soest (c.1230-1812)
- Dominikanerkloster St. Pauli Leipzig and Paulinerkirche in Leipzig (1231-1544)
- Church of Saint Paul in Esslingen am Neckar (1233-1532)
- Dominican Monastery in Frankfurt am Main (1233-1803)
- St. Paulus (Hildesheim) in Hildesheim (1233-1546)
- Dominican Convent in Regensburg (since 1233)
- Dominikanerkloster Nürnberg in Nuremberg (1234-1525)
- Kloster Altenhohenau in Griesstätt (1235-1822), now Church of Saints Peter and Paul (Altenhohenau)
- Kloster St. Katharina in Trier (1235-1802)
- Dominican Monastery in Freiburg im Breisgau (c.1235-1794)
- Dominikanerkloster St. Johannis (Hamburg) in Hamburg (1236-1529 and since 1962)
- Kloster St. Pauli (Minden) in Minden (1236-1736)
- Kirchberg convent in Sulz am Neckar (1237-1865)
- Kloster Cronschwitz in Wünschendorf/Elster (1238-1544)
- Kloster Gotteszell in Schwäbisch Gmünd (1240-1803)
- Kloster Schwarzhofen in Schwarzhofen (c.1240-1285 and 1691–1802)
- St Catharine's Convent in Augsburg (1243-1802), now Staatsgalerie Altdeutsche Meister
- Kloster Lambrecht in Lambrecht, Rhineland-Palatinate (1244-1553)
- Kloster Mödingen in Mödingen (1246-1802)
- Kloster Engelthal in Nürnberger Land (1248-1565)
- Kloster Löwental in Friedrichshafen (1250-1806)
- Dominikanerinnenkloster Pforzheim in Pforzheim (c.1250-1564)
- Katharinenkloster (Stralsund) and Church of Saint Catherine in Stralsund (1250s-1525)
- Kloster Reuthin in Wildberg, Baden-Württemberg (1252-1535)
- St. Catherine's Monastery in Bremen (1253-1528)
- Dominikanerkloster Greifswald in Greifswald (1254-1566)
- Johanniskloster (Rostock) in Rostock (1256-1534)
- Convent of Saint Gertrude in Cologne (1257-1802)
- Ehemaliges Dominikanerkloster Mainz in Mainz (1257-1789)
- Kloster Habsthal in Ostrach (1259-1840)
- Kloster Sießen in Bad Saulgau (1260-1860)
- St. Ludwig (Speyer) in Speyer (1262-1802)
- Kloster Maria Engelport near Treis-Karden (1262-1272)
- Kloster Obermedlingen in Medlingen (1263-1555 and 1651–1804)
- Dominican monastery in Bad Wimpfen (1264-1818)
- Kloster Norden in East Frisia (1264-1527)
- Augustinerkirche (Würzburg) in Würzburg (1266-1813)
- Kloster Frauenaurach in Erlangen (1267-1549)
- Predigerkirche (Rottweil) in Rottweil (1268-1803)
- Dominikanerkloster Mergentheim in Bad Mergentheim (c.1270-1805)
- Dominikanerkloster Eichstätt in Eichstätt (1271-1806)
- Dominikanerkloster Landshut and Dominican Church in Landshut (1271-1802)
- Kloster Neudingen in Donaueschingen (1274-1559)
- Dominikanerkloster Prenzlau in Prenzlau (1275-1545)
- Kloster Stetten in Hechingen (1278-1802)
- Kloster Maria Himmelskron in Worms (1278-1570)
- Kloster Ennetach in Mengen (1280-1826)
- Dominican Convent in Osnabrück (1283-1803), now Kunsthalle Osnabrück
- St. Maria in vinea in Warburg (1283-1803)
- Kloster Lauffen in Lauffen am Neckar (1285-1466)
- Dominikanerkloster Röbel in Röbel (1285-1540s)
- Kloster St. Pauli (Brandenburg an der Havel) in Brandenburg an der Havel (1286-1560)
- Church of the College in Jena (1286-1548)
- University Church of Marburg in Marburg (1291-1526)
- St. Mariä Himmelfahrt (Wesel) in Wesel (1291-1807)
- Schwarzes Kloster (Wismar) in Wismar (1293-1562)
- Dominikanerkloster Aachen and Church of Saint Paul in Aachen (1294-1802)
- SS. Peter and Paul's Church in Göttingen (1294-1529)
- Kloster Blankenburg in Oldenburg (1294-1577)
- Kloster Engelthal (Hallwangen) in Dornstetten (1295-1588)
- Katharinenkirche in Nuremberg (1295-1596)
- Dominikanerkloster Cölln in Berlin (c.1297-1536)
- Klosterkirche Pirna in Pirna (since c.1300)
- Dominikanerkloster Bamberg in Bamberg (1310-1806)
- Monastery of Saint Magdalena in Speyer (1304-1802)
- Church of the Dominicans in Augsburg (1312-1802)
- Kloster Zoffingen in Konstanz (since 1318)
- Propsteikirche, Dortmund in Dortmund (1330-1816)
- Monastery of Saint Ursula in Augsburg (1335-1803 and since 1828)
- Evangelische Stadtkirche (Treysa) in Treysa (1350-1526)
- Dominikanerinnenkloster Heilig Grab in Bamberg (1365-1806 and since 1926)
- Liebenau monastery near Worms (1430-1565)
- Hospitalkirche (Stuttgart) in Stuttgart (1471-16th century)
- Klausenkapelle in Meschede (1473-1820)
- Kloster Galiläa in Meschede (1483-1810)
- St. Joseph (Gronau) in Gronau, Lower Saxony (1680-1815)
- Kloster Adelhausen in Freiburg im Breisgau (1687-1867), formed by merger of several earlier Dominican houses, now Adelhauser Kirche Mariä Verkündigung und St. Katharina
- Dominican Church in Münster (1708-1811)
- Kloster Wörishofen in Bad Wörishofen (1718-1802 and since 1842)
- Church of the Saviour in Heidelberg (1720-1802)
- Dominikanerinnenkloster Fremdingen in Fremdingen (1737-1802 and since 1828)
- Kloster Landsberg am Lech in Landsberg am Lech (since 1845)
- Kloster Niederviehbach in Niederviehbach (since 1847)
- Wettenhausen Abbey in Kammeltal (since 1864)
- Former Dominican monastery in Düsseldorf (1867-1973)
- Kloster Dießen in Dießen am Ammersee (1867-1917)
- Kloster Arenberg in Koblenz (since 1868)
- Church of Saint Paul in Berlin (since 1869)
- Polling Abbey in Polling, Weilheim-Schongau (since 1892)
- Kloster Lohhof in Mindelheim (1902-2001)
- Kolleg St. Thomas der Dominikaner in Vechta (since 1902)
- Schlehdorf Abbey in Schlehdorf (since 1904)
- Kloster Strahlfeld in Roding (since 1917)
- Kloster Volkersberg in Bad Brückenau (1921-1955)
- Dominican Convent of Saint Albert in Bornheim-Walberberg (1925-2007)
- Dominikanerkloster St. Albert (Leipzig) in Leipzig (since 1931)
- Kloster Heilig Kreuz (Augsburg) in Augsburg (since 1936)
- St. Andrew's Church in Cologne (since 1947); burial place of Albertus Magnus
- Theatine Church in Munich (since 1954)
- Convent of Saint Albertus Magnus in Braunschweig (since 1958)
- Kloster Neustadt am Main in Neustadt am Main (since 1961)
- Kommende Lage in Rieste (1999-2020)
- Institut M.-Dominique Chenu in Berlin (since 2000)
- Church of Saint Martin in Freiburg im Breisgau (since 2009)

=== Greece ===
- Church of Saint Nicholas in Chania (c.1320-1645)

=== Hungary ===
- Vértesszentkereszti apátság in Vértes Hills (1478-16th century)
- Church of Saint Jude in Sopron (1719-1780s)

=== Ireland ===
- Black Abbey in Kilkenny (1225-1558, 1640s, late 1680s, and since 1776)
- Athenry Abbey in Athenry (1241-1574)
- St. Dominic's Abbey in Cashel, County Tipperary (1243-1540 and 18th-19th centuries)
- Strade Abbey in County Mayo (1252-1578 and 18th century)
- Roscommon Abbey in Roscommon (1253-1570s)
- Sligo Abbey in Sligo (1253-1913, with interruptions)
- Athy Priory in Athy (c.1253-1539 and 1622-19th century)
- North Abbey in Youghal (1268-16th century)
- Rathfran Friary in County Mayo (1274-1577)
- Carlingford Abbey in Carlingford, County Louth (c.1305-1540s)
- Aghaboe Abbey in County Laois (1382-1540)
- Portumna Abbey in Portumna (1426-1698)
- Burrishoole Friary in County Mayo (1470-16th century)
- Kloster Cloonameehan in County Sligo (1488-1584)
- Ballindoon Friary in County Sligo (1507-c.1585)
- Castlelyons Friary in County Cork (1683-1760)
- Dominican College Sion Hill in Blackrock, Dublin (since 1836)
- Newbridge College in Newbridge, County Kildare (since 1852)
- Priory of the True Cross in Arklow, County Wicklow (land granted by Henry II in 1264 and founded by Theobald FitzWalter or Theobald le Botiller, dissolved in 1539) (also known as Holy Cross Abbey, Arklow Abbey or Arklow Friary)
- St. Mary’s Priory, Tallaght, Dublin, established in 1855.
- St. Saviour’s Priory, Dublin, consecrated in 1861.

=== Italy ===
- San Sisto Vecchio in Rome (since 1218)
- San Domenico in Bologna (since 1219), burial place of Saint Dominic
- Church of Santa Sabina in Rome (since 1220), mother church of the order
- Santa Maria Novella in Florence (since 1221)
- Basilica of San Domenico in Siena (since 1226)
- Santa Caterina del Sasso in Leggiuno (since 1230)
- Church of San Domenico Maggiore in Naples (since 1231, with 19th-century interruptions)
- Santi Giovanni e Paolo in Venice (1234-1807)
- Convent of Maria Steinach in Algund (1243-1782)
- Church of San Domenico in Faenza (13th century-2008)
- San Domenico, Cortona in Cortona (before 1258, suppressed in 1786)
- Church of San Giacomo Apostolo in Forlì (13th century-1867)
- Matris Domini Monastery in Bergamo (since 1258)
- Chiesa dei Domenicani in Bolzano (since the 1260s)
- Santa Maria sopra Minerva in Rome (since 1275, with interruptions in the 1810s and 1870s) and nearby Palazzo San Macuto, built in 1641; burial place of Catherine of Siena and Fra Angelico
- Church of Sant'Anastasia in Verona (since 1280)
- Church of San Domenico in Palermo (since c.1280)
- Church of Saint Dominic in Chioggia (1287-1806)
- Convent of Corpus Domini in Venice (1394-1810)
- Convent of San Domenico in Fiesole (since 1406)
- Convent of San Marco in Florence (1437-2014, with 19th-century interruptions), now Museo Nazionale di San Marco
- Santa Maria di Castello in Genoa (1441-2015)
- Friary of Santa Maria delle Grazie in Milan (since 1463)
- Sanctuary of the Virgin of Taburnus in Bucciano (since 1498)
- Church of Santa Maria della Pietà in Palermo (since 1526)
- Santi Domenico e Sisto in Rome (since 1569); the adjacent convent has housed the Pontifical University of Saint Thomas Aquinas since 1928
- Santa Maria della Sanità in Naples (since 1577)
- Santissima Trinità a Via Condotti in Rome (since 1880)

=== Latvia ===
- Basilica of the Assumption in Aglona (since 1699, with interruptions)

=== Lithuania ===
- Dominican Church of the Holy Spirit in Vilnius (1501-1807)
- Church of St. Philip and St. Jacob in Vilnius (1624-1812, 1920s-1948 and since 1992)

=== Luxembourg ===
- Marienthal Monastery in Marienthal (13th century-1783)

=== Malta ===
- Basilica of St Dominic in Valletta (since 1571)
- Our Lady of Pompei Church in Victoria, Gozo (since 1889)

=== Netherlands ===
- Grote or Jacobijnerkerk in Leeuwarden (1245-1570s)
- Kloosterkerk in The Hague (1397-1574)

=== Poland ===
- Basilica of the Holy Trinity in Kraków (since 1223); burial place of Hyacinth of Poland
- Dominican Church and Convent of St. James in Sandomierz (since 1226, with interruptions)
- Church of Saint Adalbert in Wrocław (1226-1810)
- Dominikanerkloster Danzig and Church of Saint Nicholas in Gdańsk (1227-1834 and since 1945)
- Dominikanerkloster Cammin in Kamień Pomorski (1227-1540)
- Dominican Friary in Chełmno (1238-1829)
- Dominican Friary in Elbląg (1239-1542)
- Dominican Friary in Toruń (1263-1820)
- Church of Saint Hyacinth in Słupsk (since 1278)
- Church of Saint Catherine in Wrocław (1295-1810)
- Nörenberg Abbey in Ińsko (c.1308-1535)
- Church of St. Giles in Kraków (since the 15th century?)
- St. Hyacinth's Church in Warsaw (since 1603)
- St. Dominic's Church in Warsaw (since 1937)
- Church of Our Lady of the Snow in Kraków (since 1627)
- Sanctuary of Our Lady of Dzików in Tarnobrzeg (since 1677)
- Convent of the Dominican Sisters in Tarnobrzeg (since 1861)

=== Portugal ===
- Batalha Monastery in Batalha (1385-1834)
- Cathedral of Vila Real in Vila Real (1425-1834)
- Igreja de São Gonçalo in Amarante (since 1540)

=== Romania ===
- Monastery in Sighișoara (1289-1888)
- Mănăstirea dominicană din Bistrița in Bistrița (13th to 18th century)

=== Russia ===
- Kloster Gerdauen in Zheleznodorozhny, Kaliningrad Oblast (1407-1567)
- Church of St. Catherine in Saint Petersburg (1815-1892)

=== Slovakia ===
- Church of the Assumption of the Virgin Mary in Košice (c.1290-1780s)

=== Slovenia ===
- Adergas Monastery in Kranj (1248-1782)

=== Spain ===
- Convent of San Domingos de Bonaval in Santiago de Compostela (1220s-1830s)
- Convent of Santo Domingo in Valencia (1239-1835)
- Dominican Convent in Zaragoza (1250-19th century)
- Convent of Saint Dominic in Girona (1253-1827)
- Convento de San Esteban, Salamanca in Salamanca (since c.1255)
- Iglesia de San Pablo in Valladolid (since 1270)
- Dominican Friary in Pontevedra (1282-1836), now Ruins of San Domingos
- Monastery of Santo Domingo el Real in Toledo (since 1364)
- Nuestra Señora de la Soterraña in Santa María la Real de Nieva (1399-1835)
- Convento de San Pedro Mártir in Toledo (since 1407)
- Convento de las Dueñas in Salamanca (since 1419)
- Real Monasterio de Santo Tomás in Ávila (since 1482)
- Colegio de San Gregorio in Valladolid (1487-1820)
- Convento de la Madre de Dios in Toledo (late 15th century-19th century)
- Convento de Santo Domingo (Talavera de la Reina) in Talavera de la Reina (16th century?-1830s)
- Nostra Senyora del Roser in Pollença, Mallorca (16th-19th centuries)
- Convento de Santo Tomás in Madrid (1563-1835)
- Santuario de Nuestra Señora de Las Caldas in Los Corrales de Buelna (1605-1835 and since 1877)
- Convent of Saint Blasius in Lerma (since 1613)
- Santuario de Nuestra Señora de la Peña de Francia in Peña de Francia (since 1900)
- Convento de la Asunción de Calatrava in Almagro, Ciudad Real (since 1903)
- Monastery of the Mother of God in Olmedo (since the 1950s)

=== Sweden ===
- Svartbrödraklostret i Lund in Lund (1221-1520s)
- Sankt Nicolai kyrkoruin, Visby in Visby (1228-1525)
- St. Mary's Church in Sigtuna (1237-1527)
- Kloster Åhus in Åhus (1243-16th century)
- Västerås konvent in Västerås (1244-1527)
- Sankta Katarinas kloster, Halmstad in Halmstad (c.1260-1531)
- Skänninge Abbey in Skänninge (1272-1544)
- St. John's Priory in Kalmar (1299-1505)
- Black Friars' Monastery in Stockholm (1336-1547)

=== Switzerland ===
- Steinenkloster in Basel (c.1230-16th century)
- Predigerkloster and Predigerkirche in Zürich (c.1231-1524)
- Töss Monastery in Winterthur (1233-16th century)
- Dominican Church in Basel (1233-1529)
- St. Katharinental Monastery in Diessenhofen (1245-1869)
- Weesen Abbey in Weesen (since 1256)
- Französische Kirche (Bern) in Bern (1269-1534)
- Monastery of Saint Ursula in Aarau (1270-1528)
- Dominican Nunnery in Basel (1274-1557), now Museum Kleines Klingental
- Oetenbach nunnery in Zürich (1286-1525)
- Dominikanerkloster St. Nicolai in Chur (1288-1539)
- Monastère des dominicaines d'Estavayer in Estavayer-le-Lac (since 1316)
- Monastery of Saint Catherine in St. Gallen (1368-1594)
- Kloster Cazis in Cazis (since 1647)
- Dominican Convent in Ilanz (since 1894)

=== Turkey ===
- Arap Mosque in Istanbul (1325-1475)

=== Ukraine ===
- Dominican Church in Lviv (1234-1946)
- Old Cathedral of St. Sophia in Kyiv (17th century)
- Cathedral of the Immaculate Conception of the Blessed Virgin Mary in Ternopil (18th century and since 1903, with interruptions)
- Superior Institute of Religious Sciences of St. Thomas Aquinas in Kyiv (since 1992)

=== United Kingdom ===
==== England ====
- Blackfriars in Oxford (1221-1530s and since 1921)
- Holborn Priory in London (1220s-1310s)
- Blackfriars in Derby (c.1230-1539)
- Blackfriars in Cambridge (1238-1538 and since 1938)
- Blackfriars in Gloucester (1239-1539)
- Blackfriars in Newcastle upon Tyne (1239-1536)
- Beverley Friary in Beverley (c.1240?-1539)
- Chester Dominican Friary in Chester (13th century-1530s)
- Blackfriars in Exeter (13th century-1538)
- Friary in Ilchester (13th century-1538)
- Blackfriars, Thetford in Norfolk (13th century-1530s), now Thetford Grammar School
- Dominican Friary in Winchester (13th century-1530s)
- Dominican Friary in York (13th century-1530s)
- Dunstable Friary in Dunstable (1259-1539)
- Blackfriars in Ipswich (1263-1538)
- Black Friary in Guildford (1272-1538)
- Blackfriars in Leicester (1284-1538)
- St. Andrew's and Blackfriars' Hall in Norwich (1307-1530s)
- Priory in Kings Langley (1308-1535 and 1557–1558)
- Blackfriars and St Ann Blackfriars in London (c.1317-1538)
- Melcombe Priory in Melcombe Regis (1418-1538)
- St Dominic's Priory Church in London (since 1861)
- St Dominic's Church, Newcastle, (1863–2016)
- Holy Cross Priory in Leicester (since 1882)
- Hawkesyard Priory, Staffordshire (1896–1988)
- The Abbey in Storrington (since 1953)
- St Cuthbert's Church in Durham (2012-2016)

==== Northern Ireland ====
- Dominican College in Portstewart (since 1917)
- Dominican College, Fortwilliam in Belfast (since 1930)

==== Scotland ====
- Blackfriars in Stirling (1233-1559)
- Blackfriars in Perth (1240-1569)
- Blackfriars in Montrose, Angus (13th century-1571)
- Blackfriars in Wigtown (c.1280s-1560s)
- Blackfriars in St Andrews (15th century-1559)
- St Columba's Catholic Church, Glasgow (2005–2016)
- St Albert's Catholic Chaplaincy, Edinburgh (since 1931)

== Africa, Asia and Oceania ==
=== Australia ===
- St Mary's College in Adelaide, South Australia (since 1869)
- St Dominic's Priory College in North Adelaide, South Australia (since 1884)
- Cabra Dominican College in Cumberland Park, South Australia (since 1886)
- Dominican School in Semaphore, South Australia (since 1899)
- Siena College in Camberwell, Victoria (since 1940)
- Blackfriars Priory School in Prospect, South Australia (since 1953)

=== China ===
- Saint Dominic's Cathedral in Fuzhou (1864-1911)

==== Taiwan ====
- Blessed Imelda's School in Taipei (since 1916)
- Dominican International School in Taipei (since 1957)
- St Dominic's High School in Kaohsiung
- St. Dominic's Church in Taipei
- St. Albert's Priory in Taipei
- St Catherine's Church in Kaohsiung
- St. Dominic's Church in Kaohsiung
- St. Catherine of Siena Church in Kaohsiung
- St. Dominic's Priory (Jianguo Road) in Kaohsiung
- St. Dominic's House (Aoya) in Kaohsiung
- Wan-chin Basilica in Pingtung
- Holy Cross House in Pingtung
- Church of the Immaculate Conception in Tainan
- St. Joseph's House in Tainan

=== Democratic Republic of Congo ===
- Université de l'Uélé in Isiro (since 1998)

=== Egypt ===
- Dominican Institute for Oriental Studies in Cairo (since 1953)

=== Iran ===
- Church of Our Lady of the Rosary in New Julfa, Isfahan (1681-18th century)
- Saint Abraham's Church in Tehran (since 1966)

=== Iraq ===
- Our Lady of the Hour Church in Mosul (1866-2014)

=== Israel ===
- École Biblique in Jerusalem (since 1890)
- St. Stephen's Basilica in Jerusalem (since 1900)

=== New Zealand ===
- St Dominic's Catholic College in Auckland (since 1952)
- St Dominic's College in Whanganui (since 1994)

=== Pakistan ===
- Monastery of the Angels in Karachi (since 1959)
- Ibn-e-Maraim Vice Province, in Punjab (since December 4,1982)

=== Philippines ===
- Manaoag Church in Manaoag (since 1605)
- Santa Catalina de Siena Church in Bambang, Nueva Vizcaya (since 1609)
- Dominican college in Manila (since 1611), from 1645 University of Santo Tomas
- Colegio de San Juan de Letran in Intramuros, Manila (since 1620)
- Saints Peter and Paul Parish Church in Calasiao (since 1621)
- Santa Catalina College in Manila (since 1696), originally in Intramuros and since 1951 in Sampaloc
- Holy Trinity University in Puerto Princesa (since 1940)
- Saint Michael Academy in Catarman, Northern Samar (since 1946)
- Dominican College of Tarlac in Capas (since 1947)
- San Pedro College in Davao City (since 1956)
- Siena College of Taytay in Taytay, Rizal (since 1957)
- Dominican School Manila in Sampaloc, Manila (since 1958)
- Siena College of Quezon City in Quezon City (since 1959)
- University of Santo Tomas in Manila (since 1611)
- University of Santo Tomas–Legazpi in Legazpi, Albay (since 1965)
- Aquinas School in San Juan, Metro Manila (since 1965)
- UST Angelicum College in Quezon City (since 1972)
- Angelicum School Iloilo in Iloilo City (since 1978)
- Siena College of San Jose in San Jose del Monte, Bulacan (since 1988)
- Dominican College of Santa Rosa in Santa Rosa, Laguna (since 1993)

=== Zimbabwe ===
- Dominican Convent High School in Harare (since 1892)
- St Dominic's Chishawasha near Harare (since 1898)
- Emerald Hill School in Harare (since 1914)
- St. John's High School in Emerald Hill, Harare (since 1925)
- Dominican Convent High School in Bulawayo (since 1956)

== Americas ==
=== Argentina ===
- Santo Domingo Convent in Buenos Aires (since 1606, with interruption c.1825-1835)
- Saint Thomas Aquinas University of the North in San Miguel de Tucumán (since 1965)

=== Canada ===
- Dominican University College in Ottawa (since 1900)

=== Colombia ===
- Colegio Jordán de Sajonia in Bogotá (since 1954)
- Colegio Lacordaire in Cali (since 1956)

=== Dominican Republic ===
- Iglesia y Convento de los Dominicos in Santo Domingo (1510-1823), from 1538 Universidad Santo Tomás de Aquino

=== Ecuador ===
- University of Saint Thomas Aquinas in Quito (1681-1826), now Central University of Ecuador

=== Guatemala ===
- Iglesia de Santo Domingo (Ciudad de Guatemala) in Guatemala City (since 1776, with interruptions)

=== Mexico ===
- Santo Domingo in Mexico City (since 1526)
- Church of Santo Domingo and Chapel of the Rosario in Puebla (since 1531)
- Porta Coeli Cathedral in Mexico City (1603-20th century)
- Iglesia de Santo Domingo (San Cristóbal de las Casas) in San Cristóbal de las Casas (since 1547)

=== Peru ===
- Convent of Santo Domingo in Lima (since the 1530s)
- Convent of Santo Domingo in Cusco (since 1534)
- Monastery of Santa Catalina de Siena in Arequipa (since 1579)

=== United States ===
- St. Rose Priory near Springfield, Kentucky (since 1806)
- Dominican School of Philosophy and Theology in Berkeley, California (since 1851)
- St. Dominic Catholic Church in Washington, D.C. (since 1853)
- St. Mary's Dominican High School in New Orleans (since 1860)
- Dominican College in Racine, Wisconsin (1864-1974)
- Church of St. Vincent Ferrer in New York City (since 1867)
- St. Dominic Church in San Francisco (since 1873)
- Saint Patrick Church in Columbus, Ohio (since 1885)
- Aquinas College in Grand Rapids, Michigan (since 1886)
- Dominican University of California in San Rafael, California (since 1890)
- Corpus Christi Monastery in New York City (since 1891)
- Dominican University in River Forest, Illinois (since 1901)
- Dominican House of Studies in Washington, D.C. (since 1905)
- Saint Agnes Academy in Houston (since 1906)
- Blessed Sacrament Church in Seattle (since 1908)
- St. Mary's Dominican College in New Orleans (1910-1984)
- Ohio Dominican University in Columbus, Ohio (since 1911)
- Blue Chapel in Union City, New Jersey (since 1912)
- Providence College in Providence, Rhode Island (since 1917)
- Albertus Magnus College in New Haven, Connecticut (since 1925)
- Aquinas Institute of Theology in St. Louis (since 1925)
- Edgewood University in Madison, Wisconsin (since 1927)
- Fenwick High School in Oak Park, Illinois (since 1929)
- St. Catharine College near Springfield, Kentucky (1931-2016)
- Caldwell University in Caldwell, New Jersey (since 1939)
- Barry University in Miami Shores, Florida (since 1940)
- Molloy University in Rockville Centre, New York (since 1941)
- Dominican University New York in Orangeburg, New York (since 1952)
- Marian Catholic High School in Chicago Heights, Illinois (since 1955)
- Mount Saint Mary College in Newburgh, New York (since 1959)
- Bishop Lynch High School in Dallas (since 1963)
- Dominican Sisters of the Heart of Jesus in Lockport, Louisiana (since 1981)
- St. Vincent Ferrer Church in River Forest, Illinois

=== Uruguay ===
- Nuestra Señora del Rosario y Santo Domingo in Montevideo (since 1947)

== See also ==
- List of Knights Templar sites
- List of Knights Hospitaller sites
- List of Jesuit sites
