= Dominican Church =

Dominican Church is the name of a number of churches belonging to the Dominicans. Notable examples include:

- Dominican Church, Vienna, Austria
- Dominican Church, Krems an der Donau, Austria
- Dominican Church of the Holy Spirit, Vilnius, Lithuania
- Dominican Church, Lviv, Ukraine
- Chiesa dei Domenicani, Bolzano, Italy
- Church of the Assumption of the Virgin Mary, Košice, Slovakia, commonly known as the Dominican Church.
