= Guillaume de Pierre Godin =

French Catholic cardinal (1260–1336)

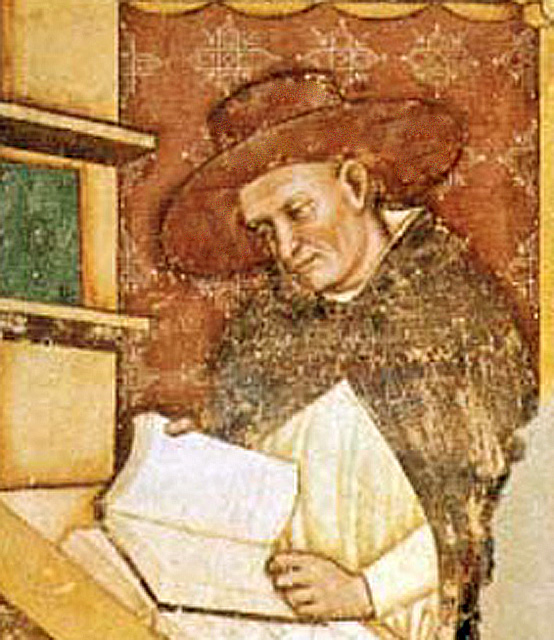
Guillaume Pierre Godin

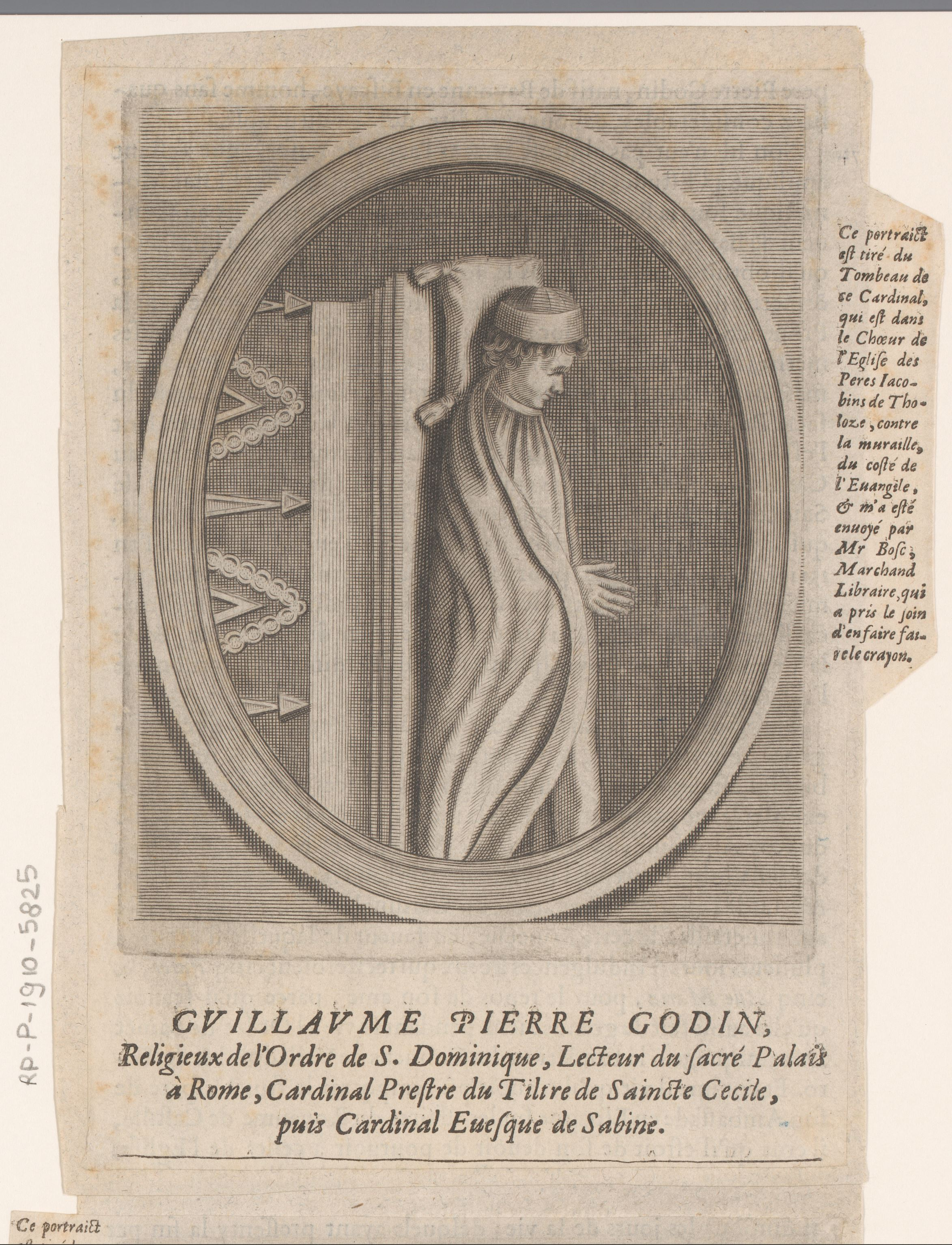
Guillaume Pierre Godin

Guillaume de Pierre Godin (Guilhem de Peyre Godin; c. 1260 – 1336) was a French Dominican theologian and Cardinal.

== Life ==
Godin was born in Bayonne and spent his early years in south-west France. In 1292 he was briefly in Paris, where he was an early opponent of Duns Scotus. From 1306 he was master of the Sacred Palace. His work there as lecturer was important in creating the Dominican orthodox Thomist position.

On either 23 or 24 December 1312, Godin was named a cardinal by Pope Clement V. He was Cardinal Priest of Santa Cecilia in Trastevere until sometime after 12 September 1317, when he was transferred to be Cardinal Bishop of Sabina.

From 1320 to 1324 Godin was papal legate in Spain. He was named Dean of the Sacred College of Cardinals in November 1323 From 1326 he was engaged in demon-hunting episcopal trials in the area of Cahors and Toulouse.

Godin contributed financially to the construction of the nave of the Church of the Jacobins in Toulouse.

He is represented in a fresco at the Couvent des Jacobins at Saint-Sever. His coat-of-arms figures in the vaults of the church of Saint Dominique at Toulouse. Until the 19th century his coat-of-arms also appeared in the vaults of Bayonne Cathedral.

== Works ==
He is now considered the author of the polemical work De causa immediata ecclesiasticæ potestatis, which in the past has been attributed to Peter Paludanus, now dated to around 1318.
