= Dominikanerkirche =

Dominikanerkirche may refer to:

- Dominican Church, Vienna
- Chiesa dei Domenicani, the Dominican Church, Bolzano, Italy
