= Martino da Verona =

Italian painter

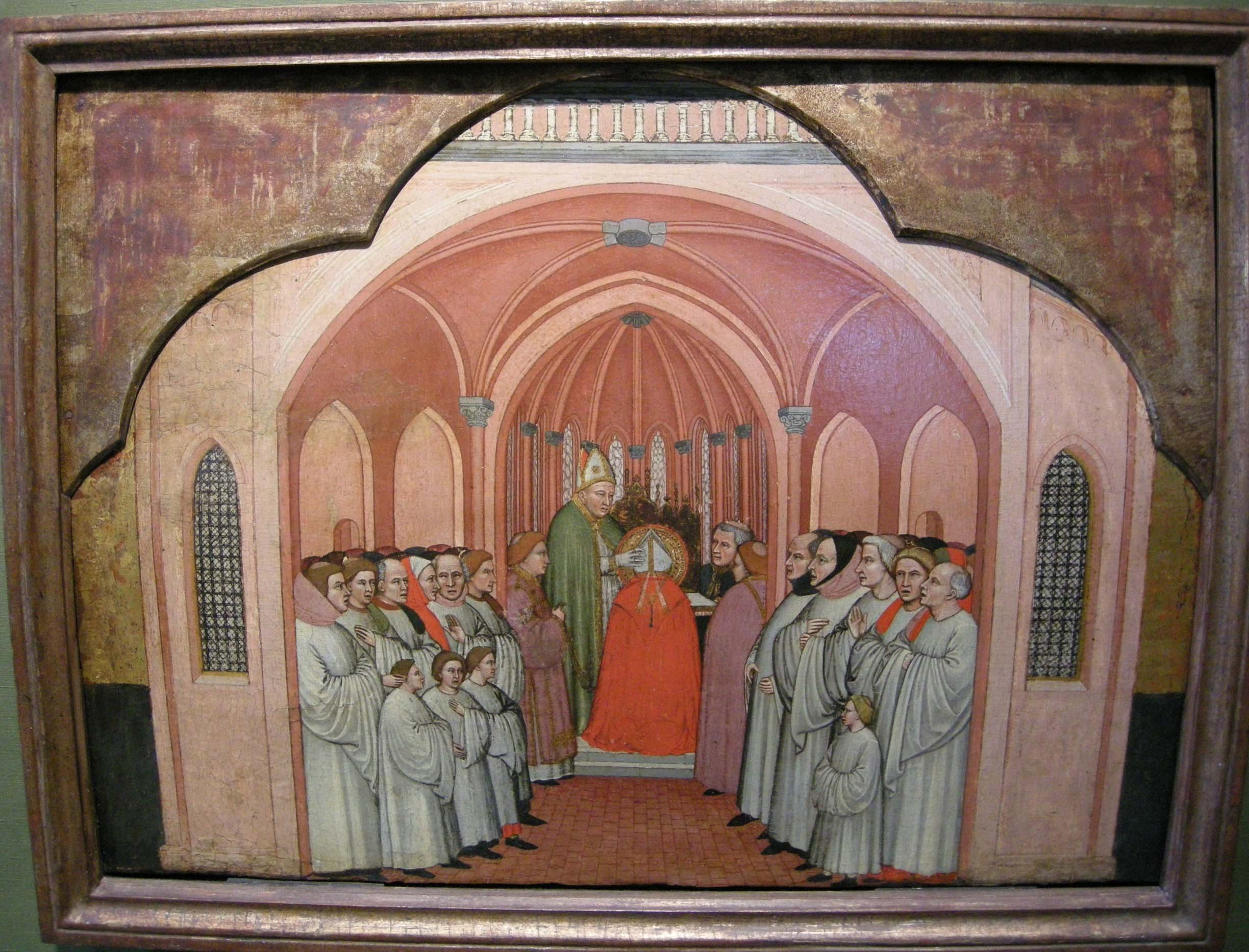
Consecration of Saint Eligius by Martino da Verona, circa 1390

Martino da Verona, also Marco del Buono Giamberti, (died 1412) was an Italian painter. His exact date of birth is not known.

== Biography ==
All that is known about Martino da Verona is through his works. He is known to have worked in and around Verona. He primarily painted religious-themed works for church commissions. The painting Four Saints (1400) at the Chiesa dei Domenicani as well as Enunciation and Coronation of the Virgin to the left of the presbytery at the church of Santo Stefano, Verona have been attributed to him. Based on analysis of The Consecration of St Eligius which resides at the Ashmolean Museum, Martino appears to have been influenced by Altichiero, who favored complex settings and narrative detail.
