= Dominican friary, Bruges =

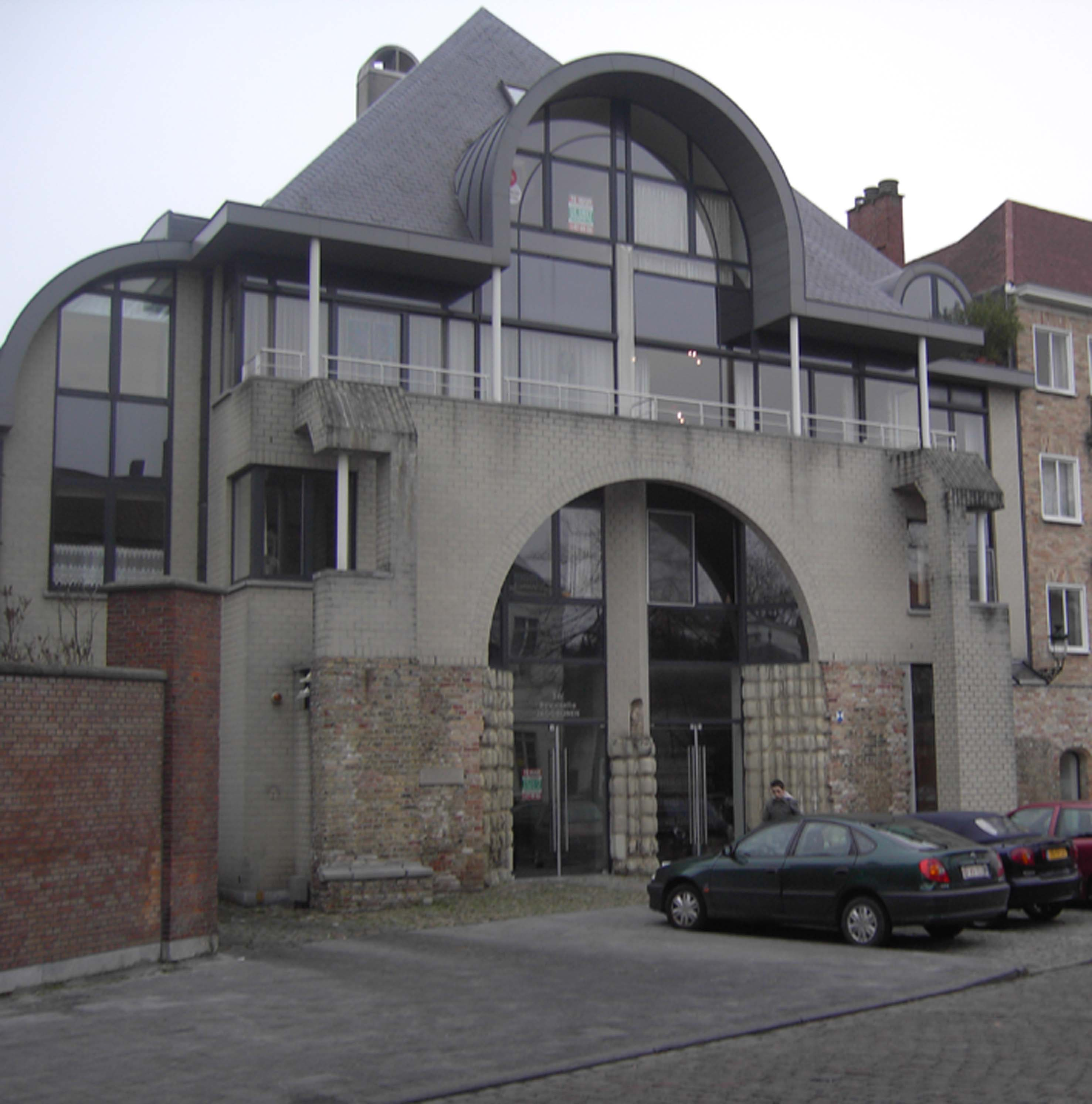
Modern apartment building incorporating remains of the Dominican church

The Dominican friary in Bruges was a major religious institution in the city of Bruges with an extensive complex of buildings around two cloisters. The Dominicans were established there in 1234; their community was suppressed during the French occupation of Belgium in 1796. The State Archives in Bruges are now housed on part of the former site of the friary.

== History ==
Joan, Countess of Flanders, granted the Dominicans a foundation in Bruges in 1234, and they quickly built a cloister and church.

In the 1280s the Dominicans began work on a new, larger church, which was consecrated in 1311 and completed in 1320. Around 1330 a chapter house was added. A serious fire in 1459 completely destroyed the library and one of the three dormitories, which were rebuilt. Between 1578 and 1584, during the Dutch Revolt, the friary suffered extensive damage. The church was reconsecrated in 1584, but rebuilding works continued to the mid-17th century. A brewery was added to the complex in 1641.

In 1751 the city of Bruges extended a canal through the city centre, expropriating land from the Dominican friary in order to do so.

The church was closed in 1794, and in 1796 the friary was suppressed and its members disbanded. The church was demolished in 1801.

== Later uses ==
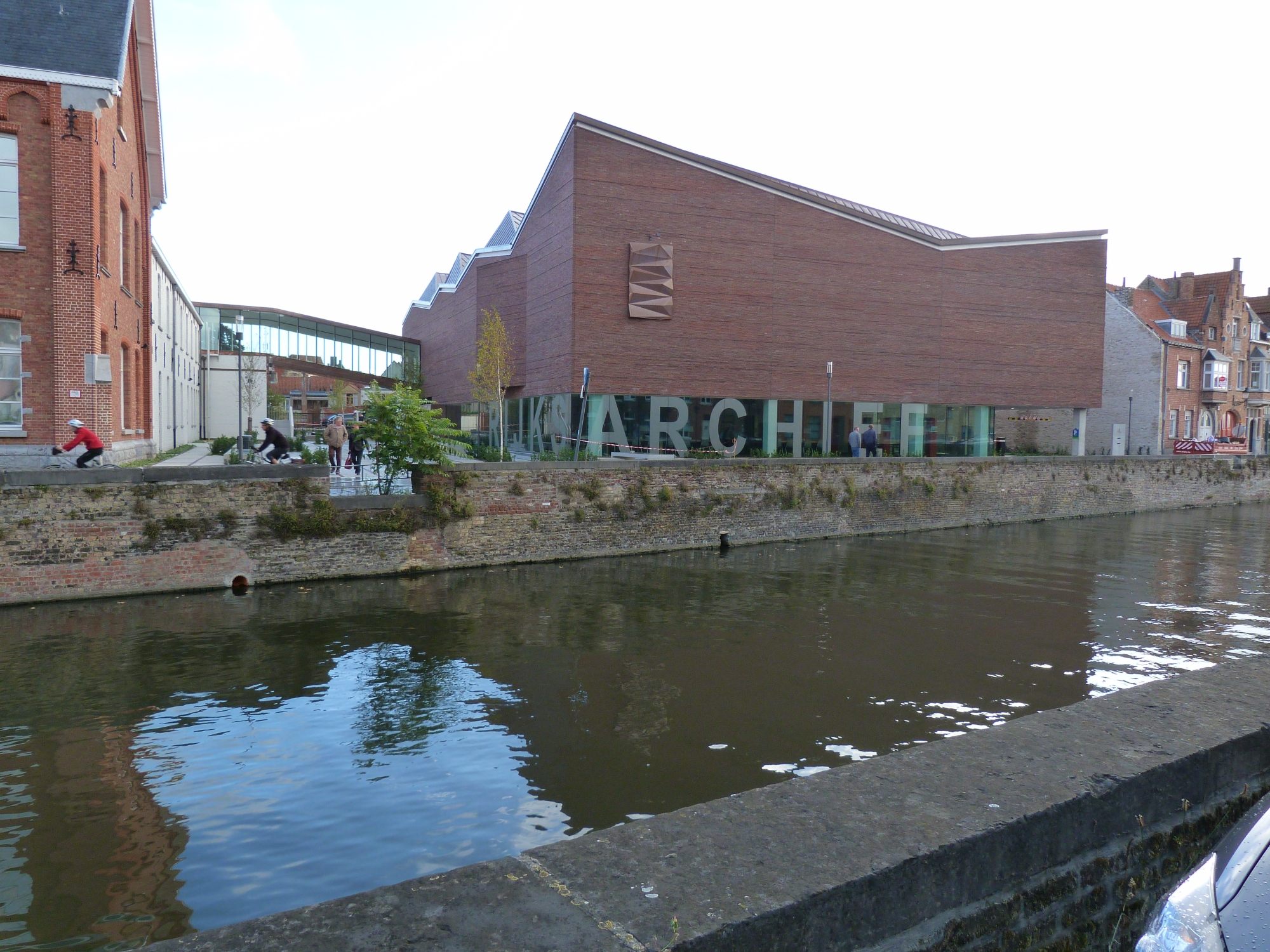
The new State Archives building in Bruges now occupies part of the site.

Between 1796 and 1998 part of the complex was used as a barracks for the Gendarmerie. Another part of the complex was in use as a hotel between 1905 and 1940. The latter was sequestered as a billet by the German forces of occupation during the Second World War. This part of the complex was used by the Belgian Red Cross from 1947 to 1992.

Such remnants of the friary buildings as survive have been listed as protected built heritage since 1980.
