= St. Peter an der Sperr =

Former monastery in Austria

Coordinates: 47°48′57″N 16°14′38″E

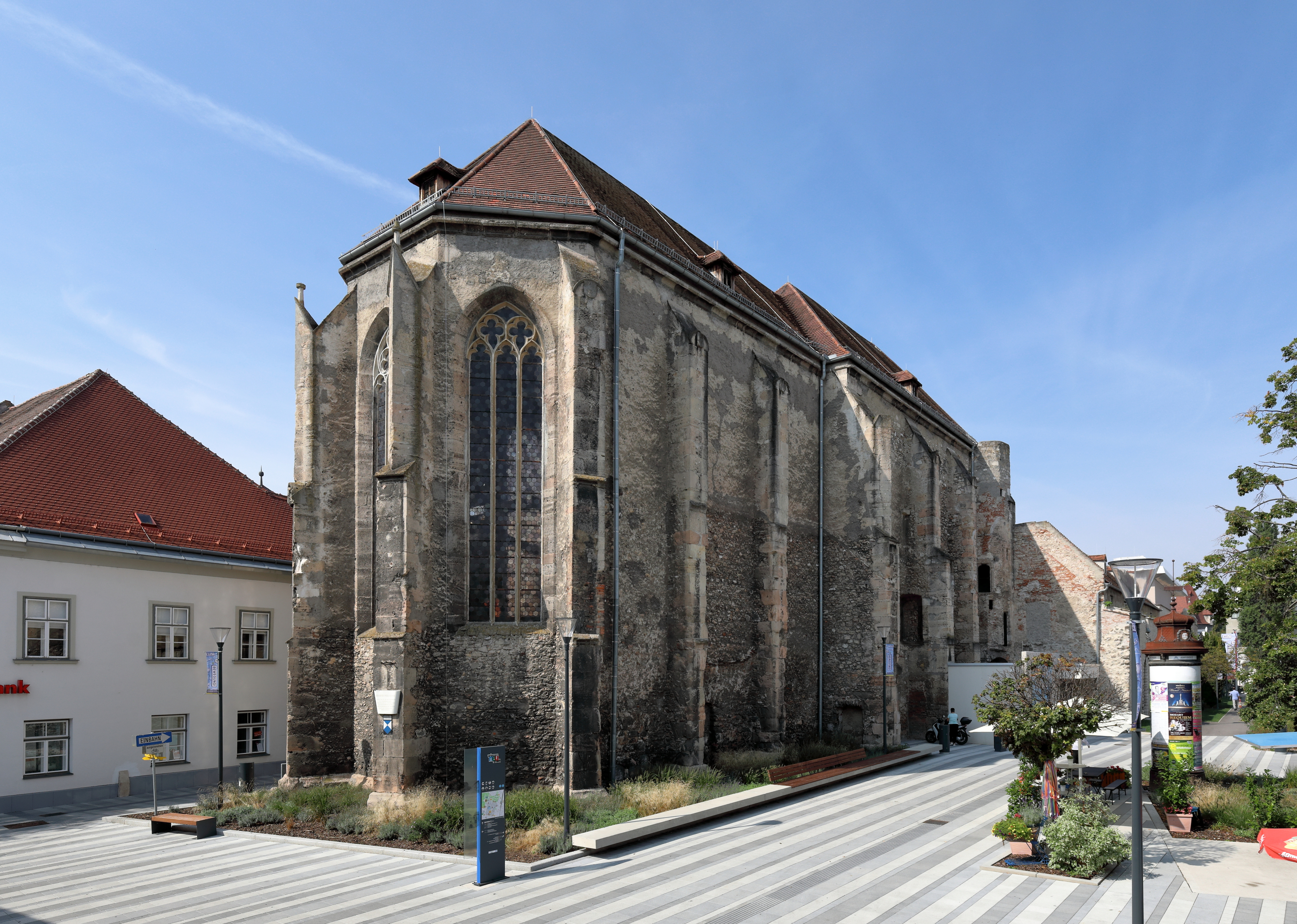
St. Peter an der Sperr

St. Peter an der Sperr was a Dominican convent church in Wiener Neustadt in Austria. The church building is now used as an exhibition space. The convent building now houses a museum.

In August 2016, during excavations in the run-up to planned conversion work for the 2019 Lower Austrian State Exhibition, archaeologists came across two medieval graves.

== Gallery ==
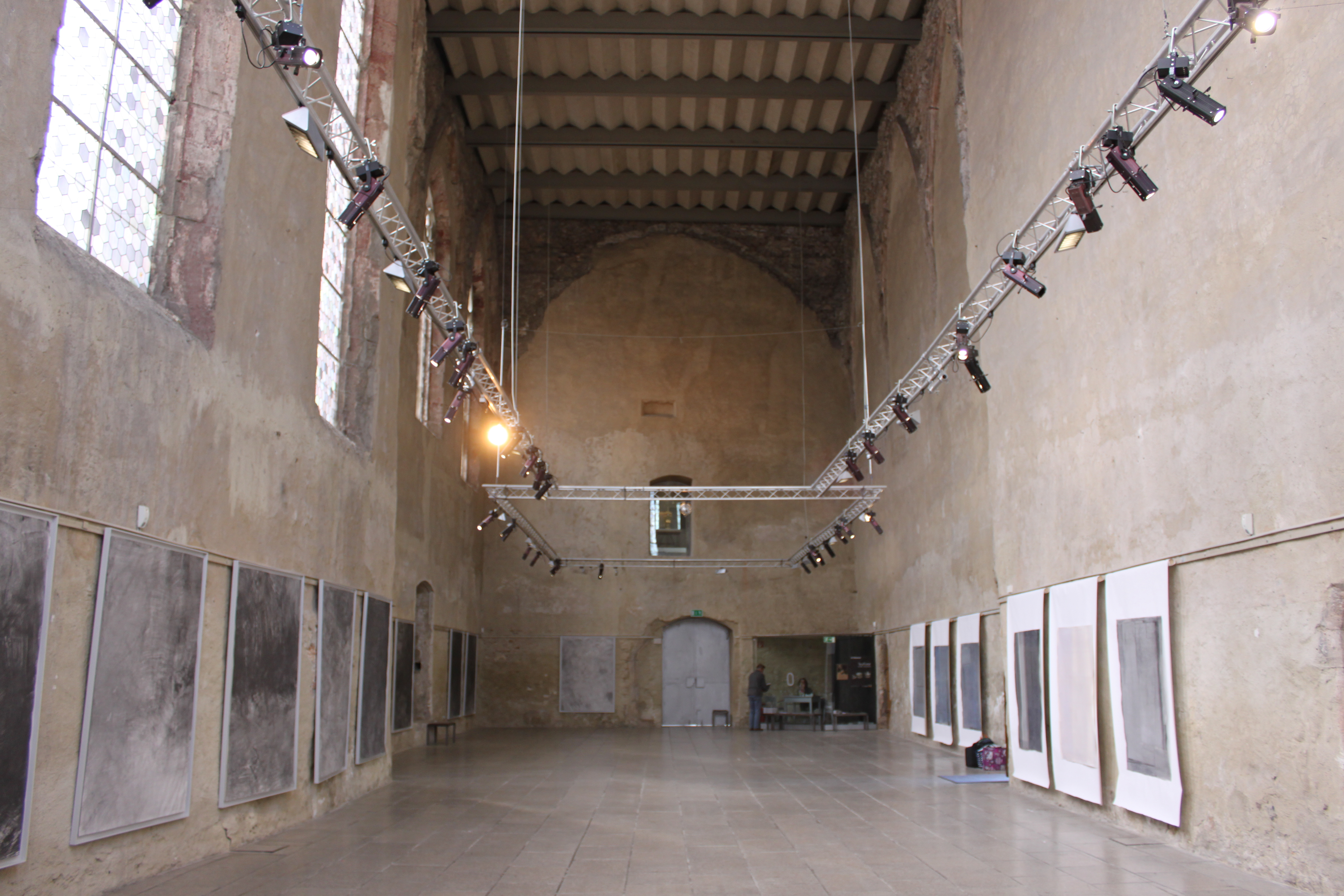
Choir to the nave with the west wall

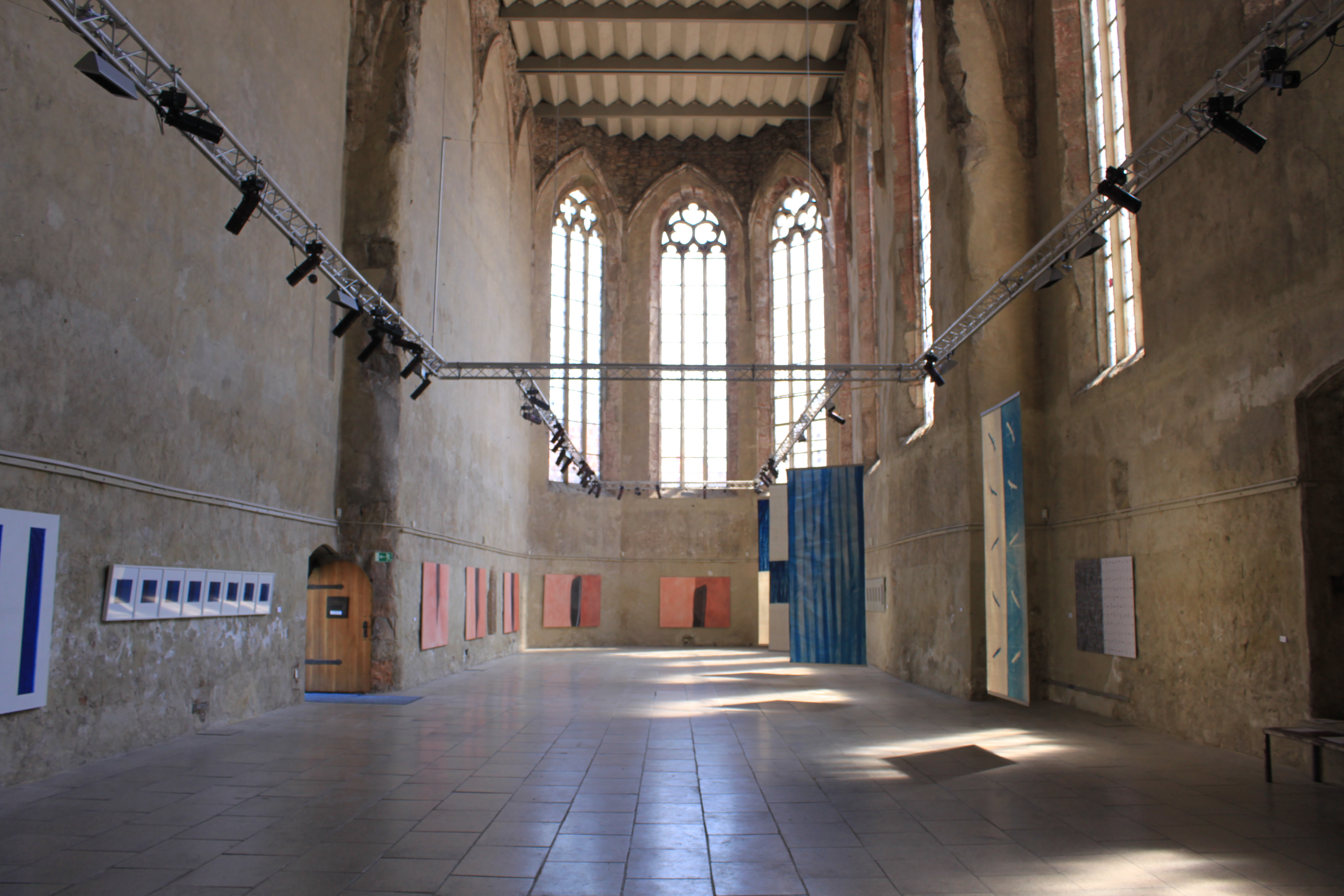
Nave to the choir

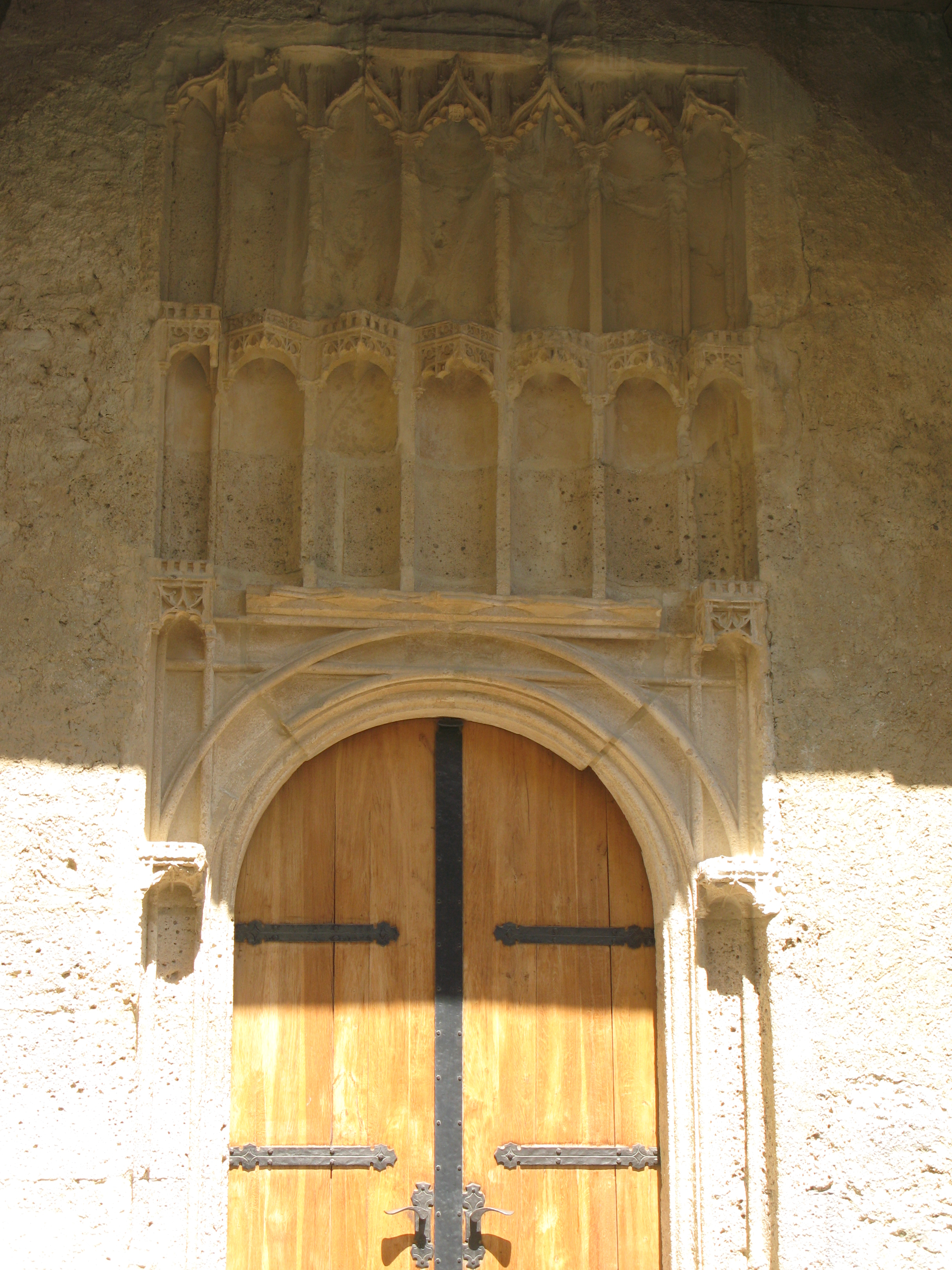
Portal with fourteen statuette niches

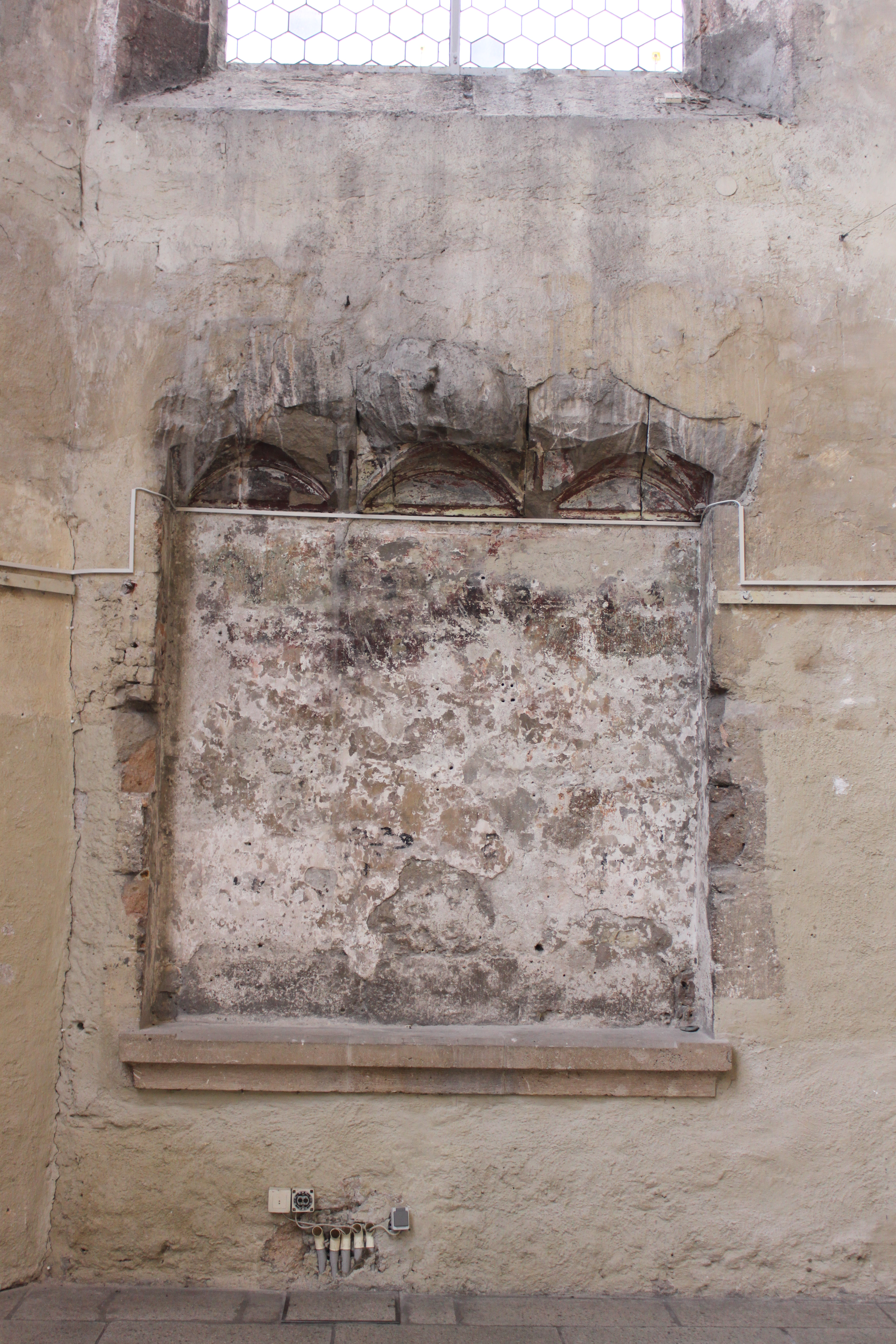
Niche in the choir
