= Convento de la Madre de Dios, Toledo =

Convent in Castile-La Mancha, Spain

Coordinates: 39.8579°N 4.0261°W

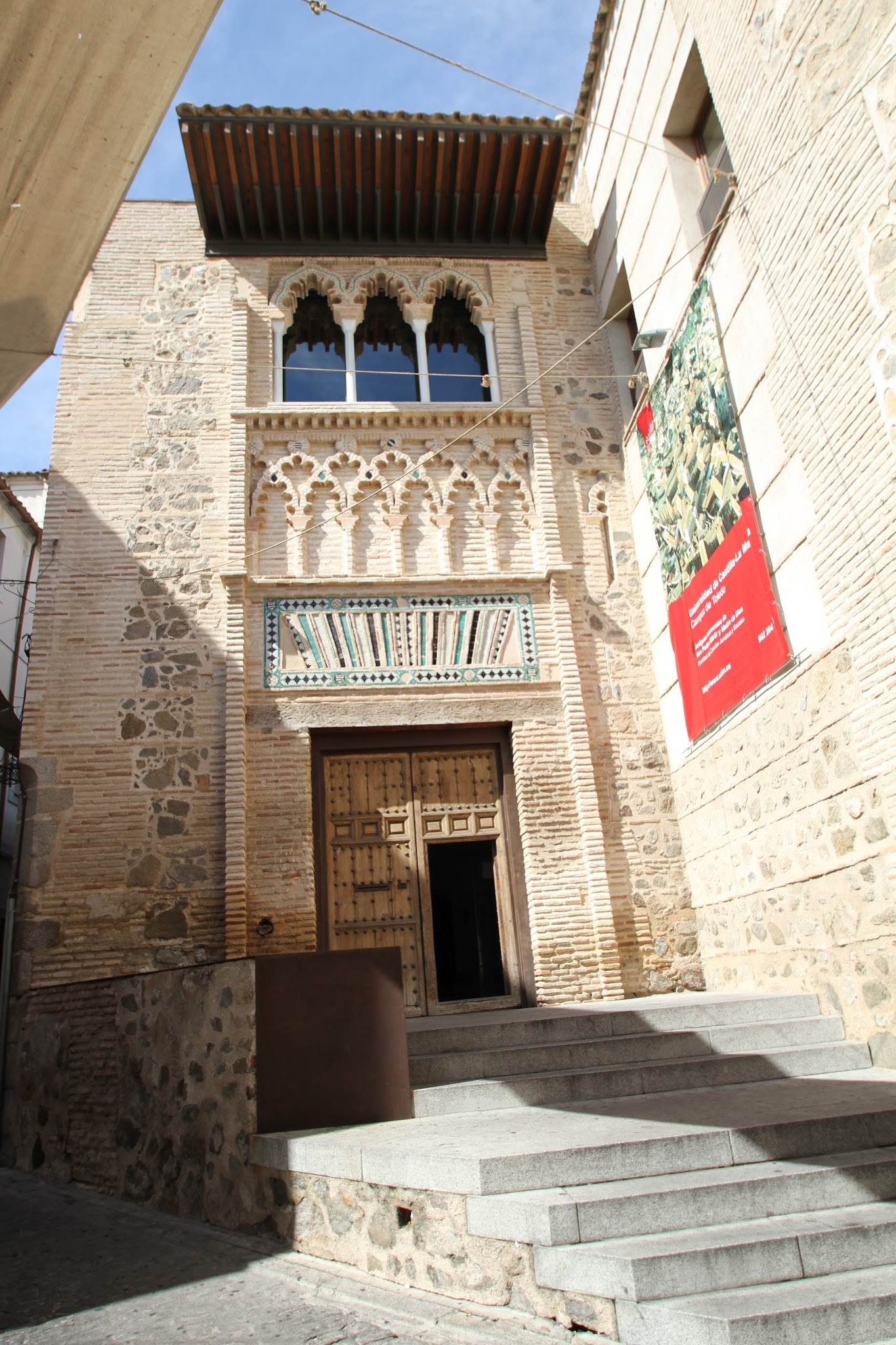
Convento de la Madre de Dios

The Convento de la Madre de Dios (Convent of the Mother of God) is a Dominican convent located in the city of Toledo (Castile-La Mancha, Spain). It was established at the end of the 15th century as a nunnery by Leonor and María de Silva, daughters of the Count of Cifuentes. It was a cloistered monastery, a Guardia Civil barracks, and finally a university campus after its acquisition by the University of Castilla-La Mancha to expand the facilities of the Faculty of Juridical and Social Sciences.

== History ==
The convent grew steadily from the end of the 15th century until the middle of the 17th century, creating the typical convent complex articulated around courtyards. From the end of the seventeenth century, there began to be a significant deterioration of the complex, which continued during the eighteenth and especially the nineteenth centuries, when some areas of the convent were lost. After several partial restorations during the twentieth century, the definitive rehabilitation of the convent occurs after its acquisition by the University of Castilla-La Mancha, to complement the university center of San Pedro Mártir .

During the rehabilitation works of the complex, various archaeological activities were carried out, especially in the area previously occupied by the nuns' garden, where archaeological remains from different eras were found (Roman, medieval, modern). It is in this phase of the intervention when the important discovery of a Mudejar doorway of the fourteenth century occurs, oriented to the square of Father Juan de Mariana, which must have been part of a civil building. It developed into three bodies: the lower, formed by the lintel door, on which is a voussoir in which rows of bricks alternate with strips of white, green and black tiles, all framed in a border, also in tilework, in which several noble coats of arms appear; the intermediate body, composed of a series of polylobulated blind arches, which intersect; and the upper body, in which there is a large window composed of three arches, also polylobulated, supported by marble columns.

Inside the convent, in the area occupied by the garden of the nuns, there is now a patio and a new construction for the expansion of the San Pedro Mártir library and its administrative spaces. The cloister, converted after several reforms into a trapezoid, was originally a single height, and now has two floors. They emphasize the epigraphic decoration that crosses the upper part of the wall of the low cloister and the wooden beams on corbels of rolls. In the upper cloister, which opens several classrooms and offices, appear right wooden feet in the middle panels of each panda, among the large glass windows incorporated in the latest reform. Finally, the presence of octagonal pillars at the corners of the upper gallery of the cloister must be highlighted.

In the eastern panda of the cloister is located the church, with its choir that will alter their positions in the nineteenth century because of the deterioration of the church. The difficulties and the abandonment that the building suffered for years meant that the roof of the primitive church was eventually lost, and the choir passed to fulfill the function of a church. Currently, this space functions as a classroom.

The building conserves in its interior the original cloister and the main nave of the church, reconverted in Aula Magna. In the exterior, the rehabilitation discovered the only Mudéjar portal of Toledo located in a noble house.

Today, 4,000 students come daily to the complex formed by the former convents of San Pedro Mártir and Madre de Dios to study law, Administration and Management of Companies or Management and Public Administration.

== See also ==
- Catholic Church in Spain
