= Igreja de São Gonçalo =

Church in Amarante Municipality, Porto District, Portugal

Coordinates: 41°16′11″N 8°04′43″W

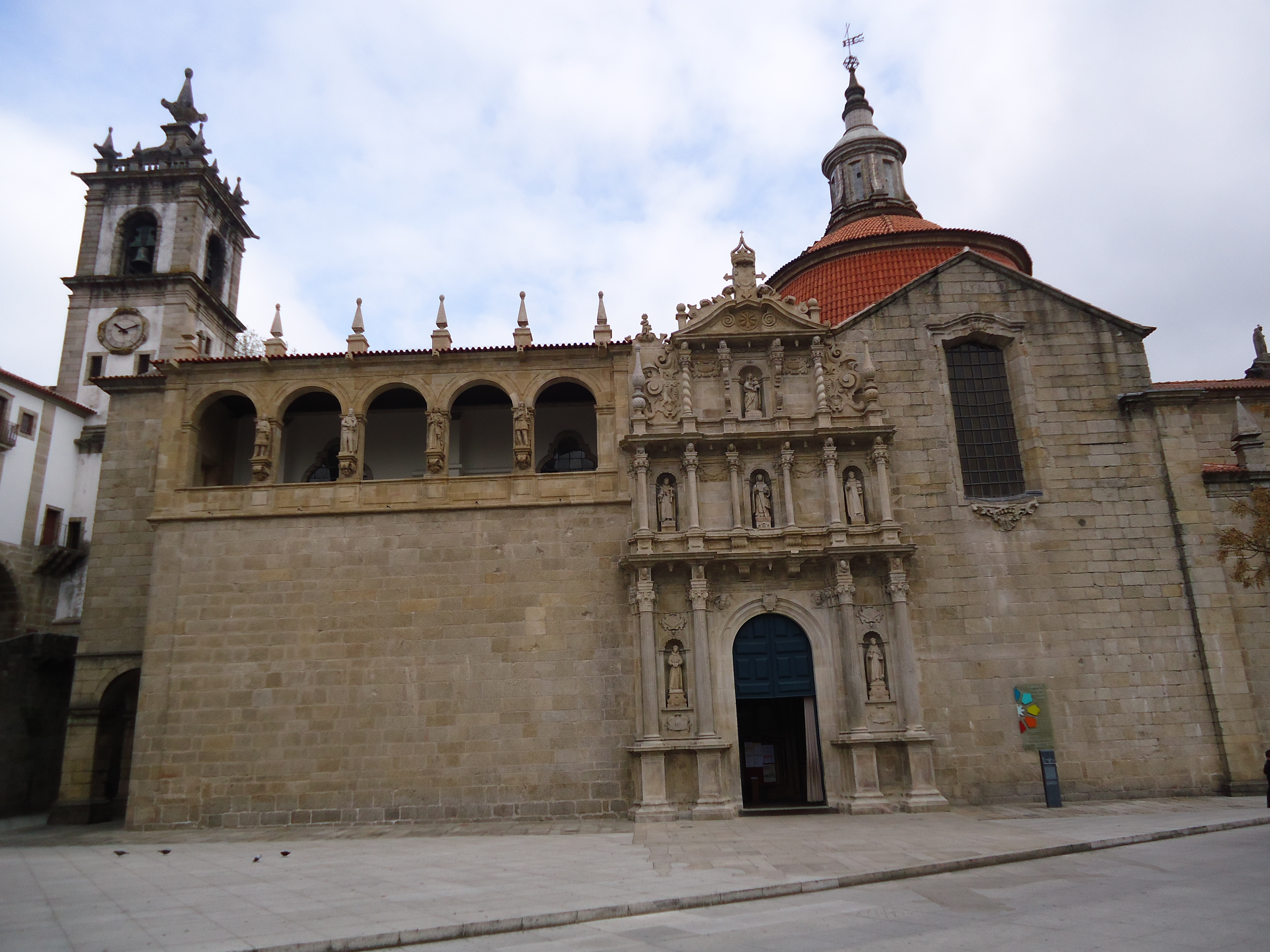
Church and convent of São Gonçalo, Amarante, district of Porto, Portugal: portada and Varanda dos Reis.

Igreja de São Gonçalo is a church in Amarante, northern Portugal. It is classified as a National Monument.
