= Church of the Assumption of the Virgin Mary, Košice =

Church in Košice, Slovakia

Coordinates: 48°43′15″N 21°15′18″E

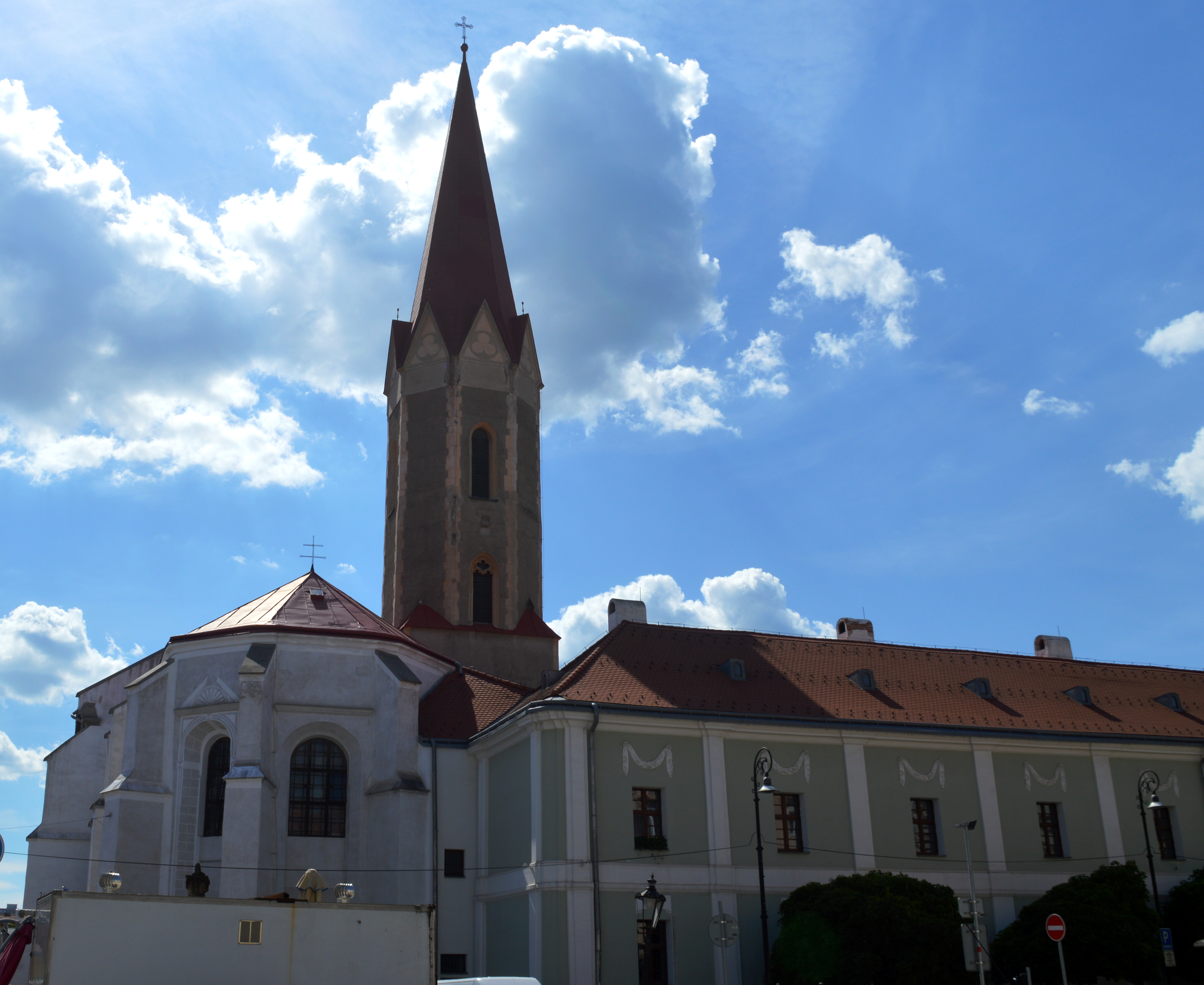
The Dominican Church

The Church of the Assumption of the Virgin Mary or commonly known as the Dominican Church (Slovak: Dominikánsky kostol) at Dominikánske námestie (English: Dominican Square) is the oldest church in Košice, Slovakia, and also the oldest preserved building in the town.

== History ==
In the first written document from 1303 it is mentioned as an already existing church. It was built in about 1290. The oldest part of the church is the Romanesque nave with narrow windows. During the Baroque reconstruction they had been broadened into the present shape. The sanctuary is built in the Gothic style as well as the tower on the northern joint of the nave with the sanctuary. The 68 metres high conical tower is the highest in Košice.

After a big fire in 1556, the damaged church served as a store-house up to the beginning of the 18th century, when it was rebuilt in the Baroque style.

== Interior ==
The interior is richly decorated with wall paintings. The ceiling was painted in the years 1750-1758 by Štefan Voroš. The main altar illustrates the Assumption of the Virgin Mary. The altar of the Rosary Virgin Mary is also to be mentioned as it is believed that the Rosary is the idea of Saint Dominic, the founder of the Dominican Order. Paintings and statues in the church represent the most famous of numerous Dominican saints: Dominic de Guzman, Catherine of Siena, Thomas Aquinas or the Dominican nun Margaret, daughter of the King Béla IV.

== Gallery ==
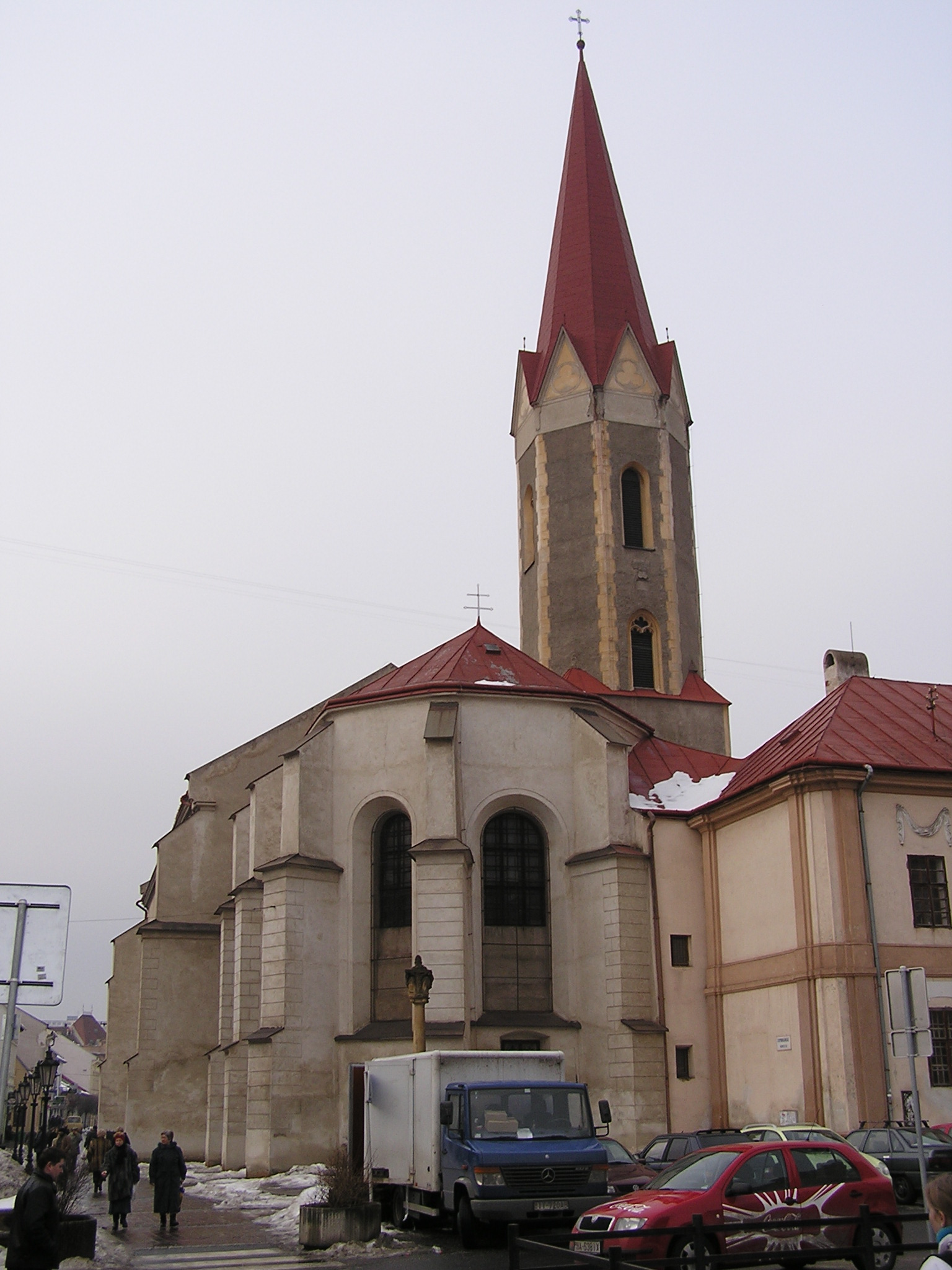
Church of the Assumption of the Virgin Mary

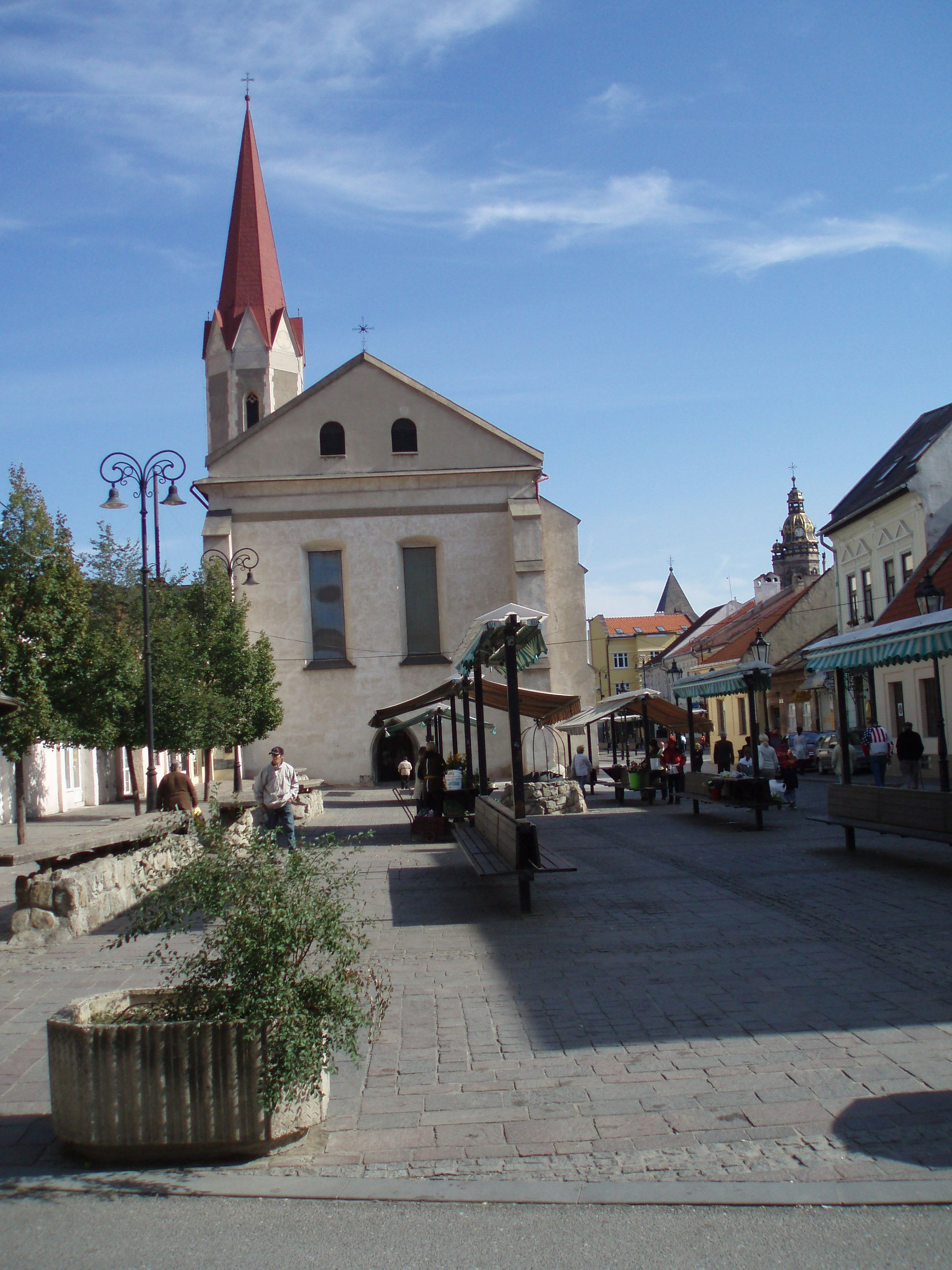
View of entrance

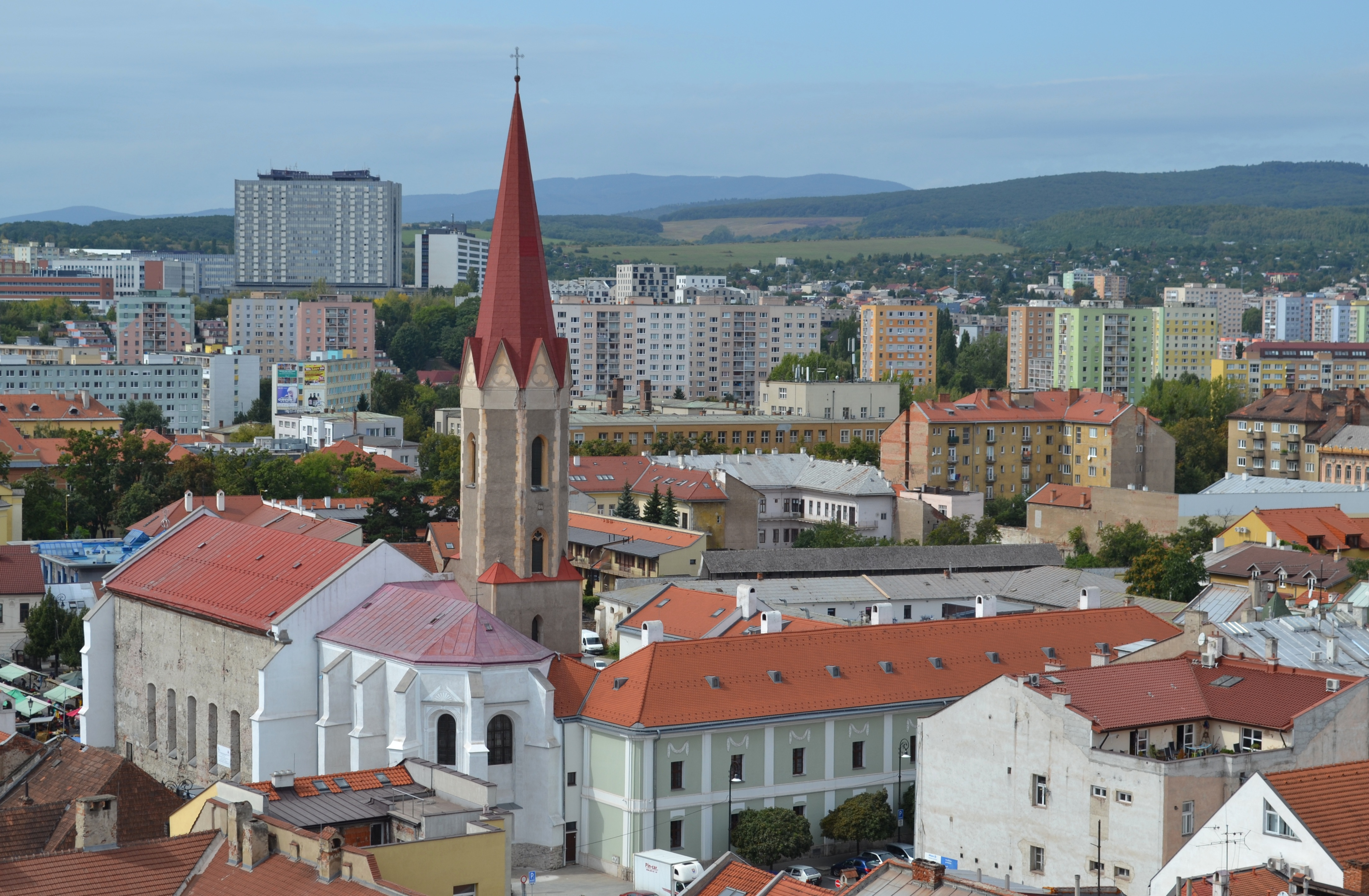
View of the church

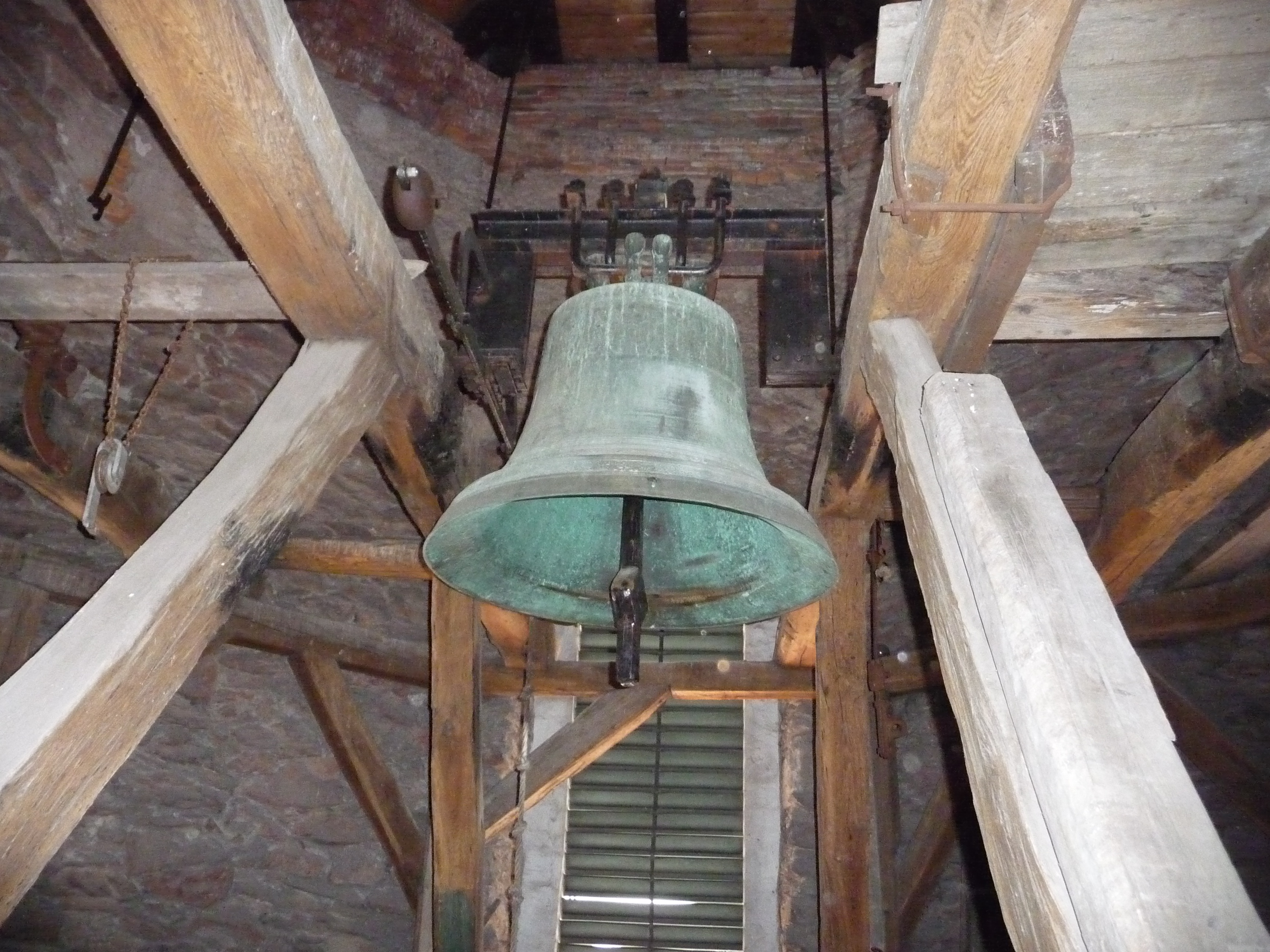
Church bell

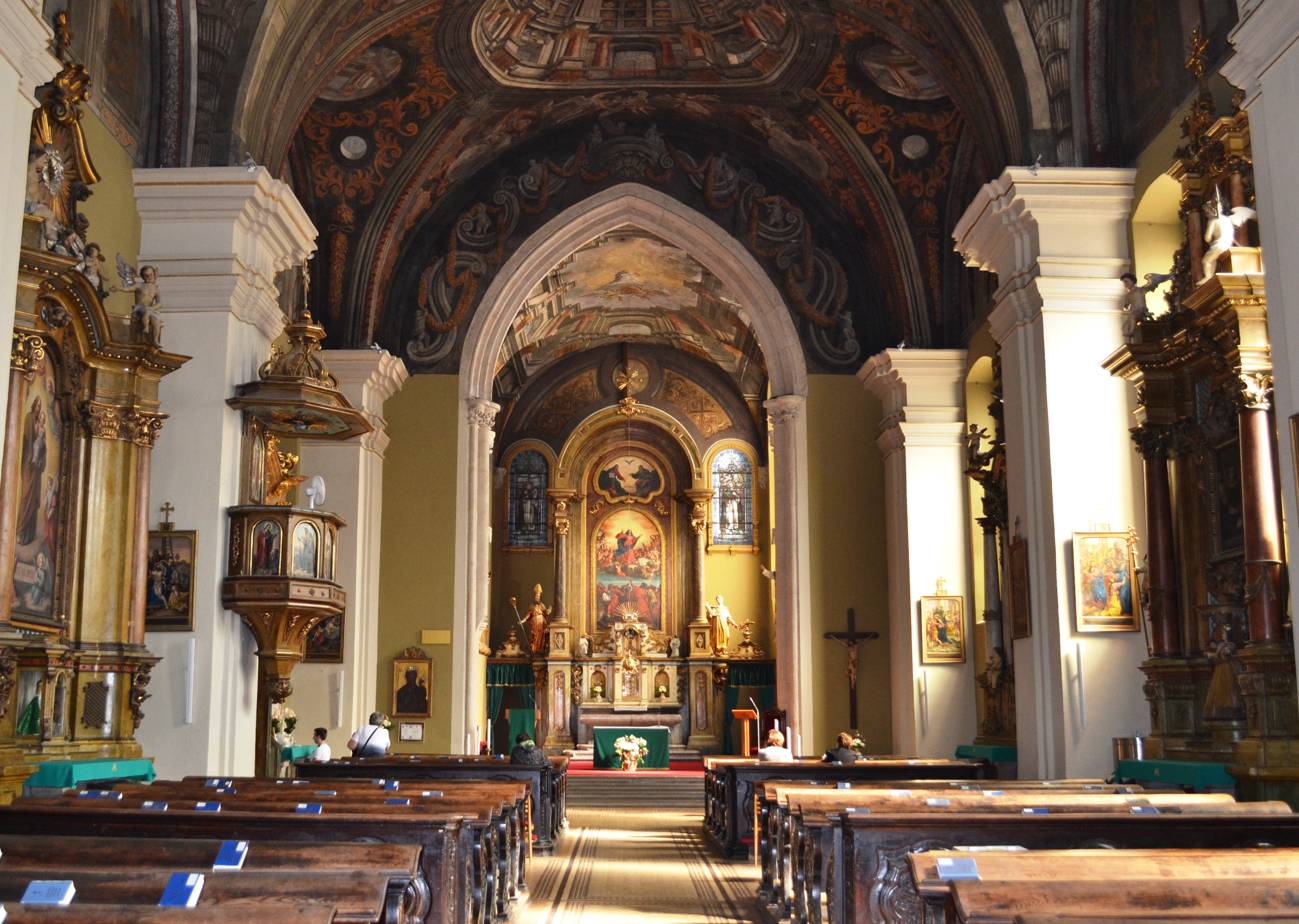
Interior

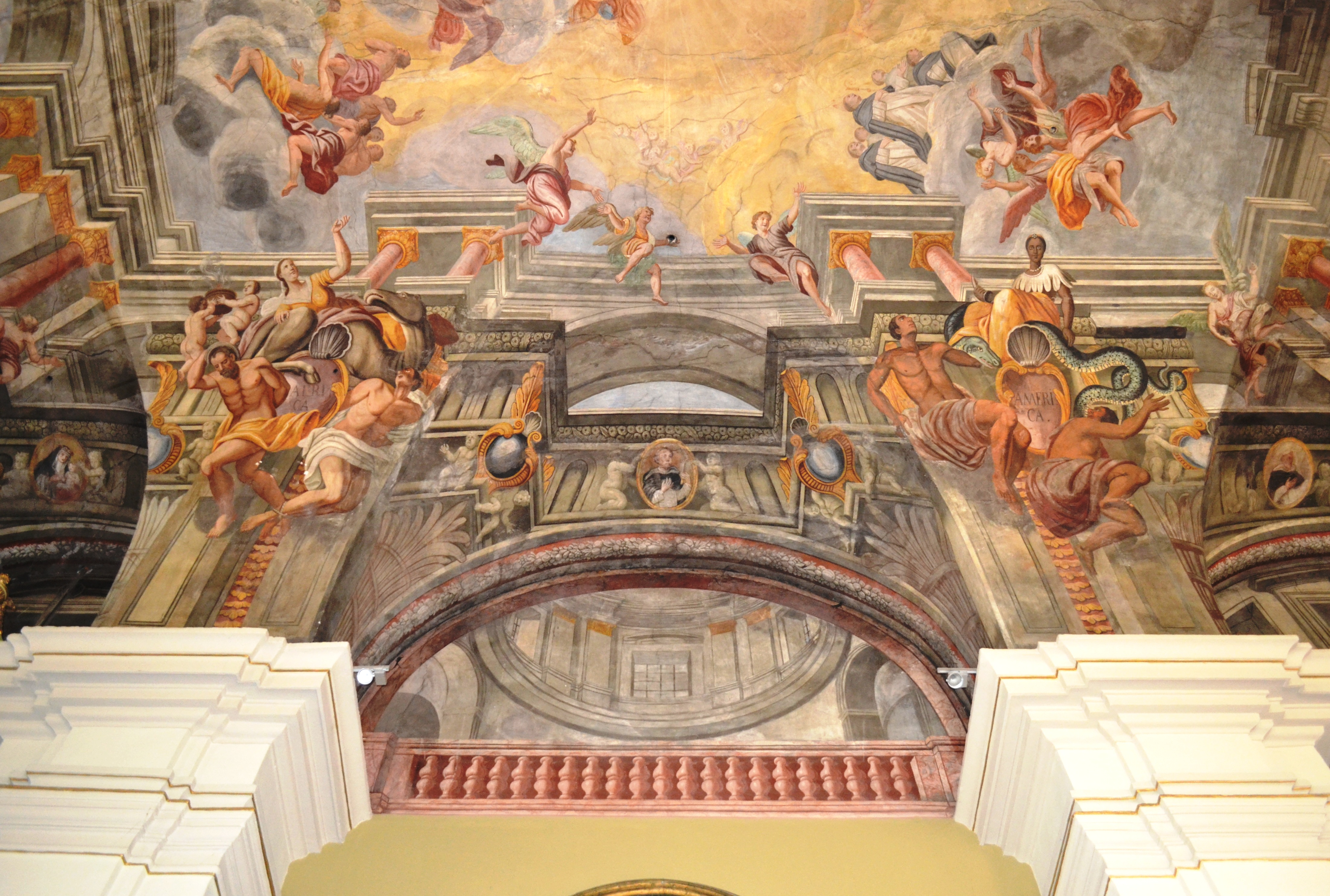
Interior

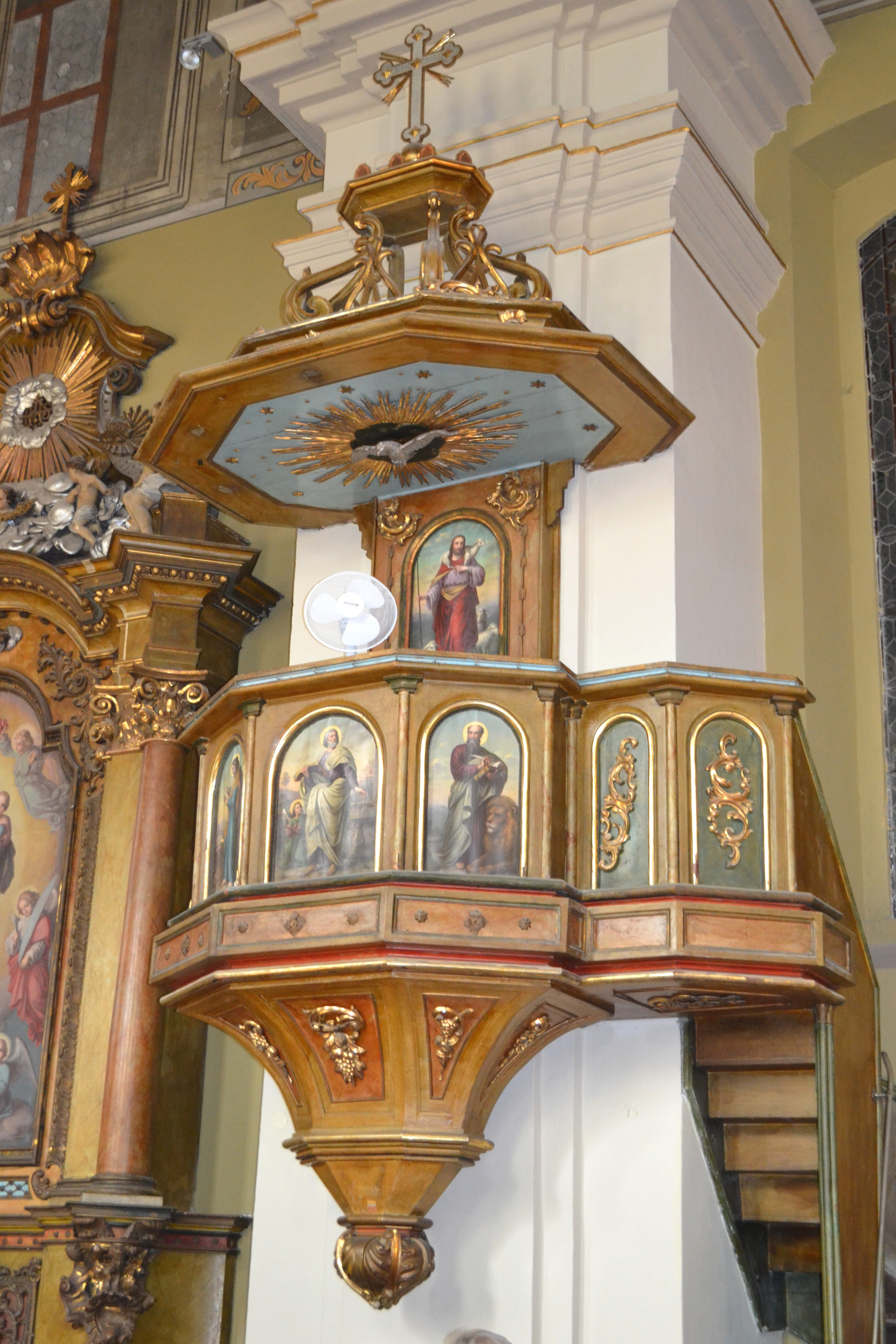
Interior

== See also ==
- Košice
