= Couvent des Jacobins (Saint-Sever) =

Jacobin monastery in France

Coordinates: 43.7583°N 0.5714°W

The Couvent des Jacobins was a Jacobin monastery in the French town of Saint-Sever - Jacobin was the French term for the Dominican Order. It was classed as a historic monument on 6 January 1971.

== History ==
Founded in 1280 thanks to the support of Eleanor of Castile, wife of Edward I of England, it was partly destroyed in 1569 by Huguenot troops under Gabriel, comte de Montgomery during the Wars of Religion. It was partly rebuilt thanks to the support of père Antonin Cloche, a native of the town who became master-general of the order in 1686. Its cloister and south and west wings were restored in the Languedoc Romanesque style using pink brick and stone. After the French Revolution it was re-used as a school, college, agricultural school, store, fire-station, municipal baths and finally a market. From the 1970s it has housed cultural aspects of the town, including the musée des Jacobins.

== Gallery ==
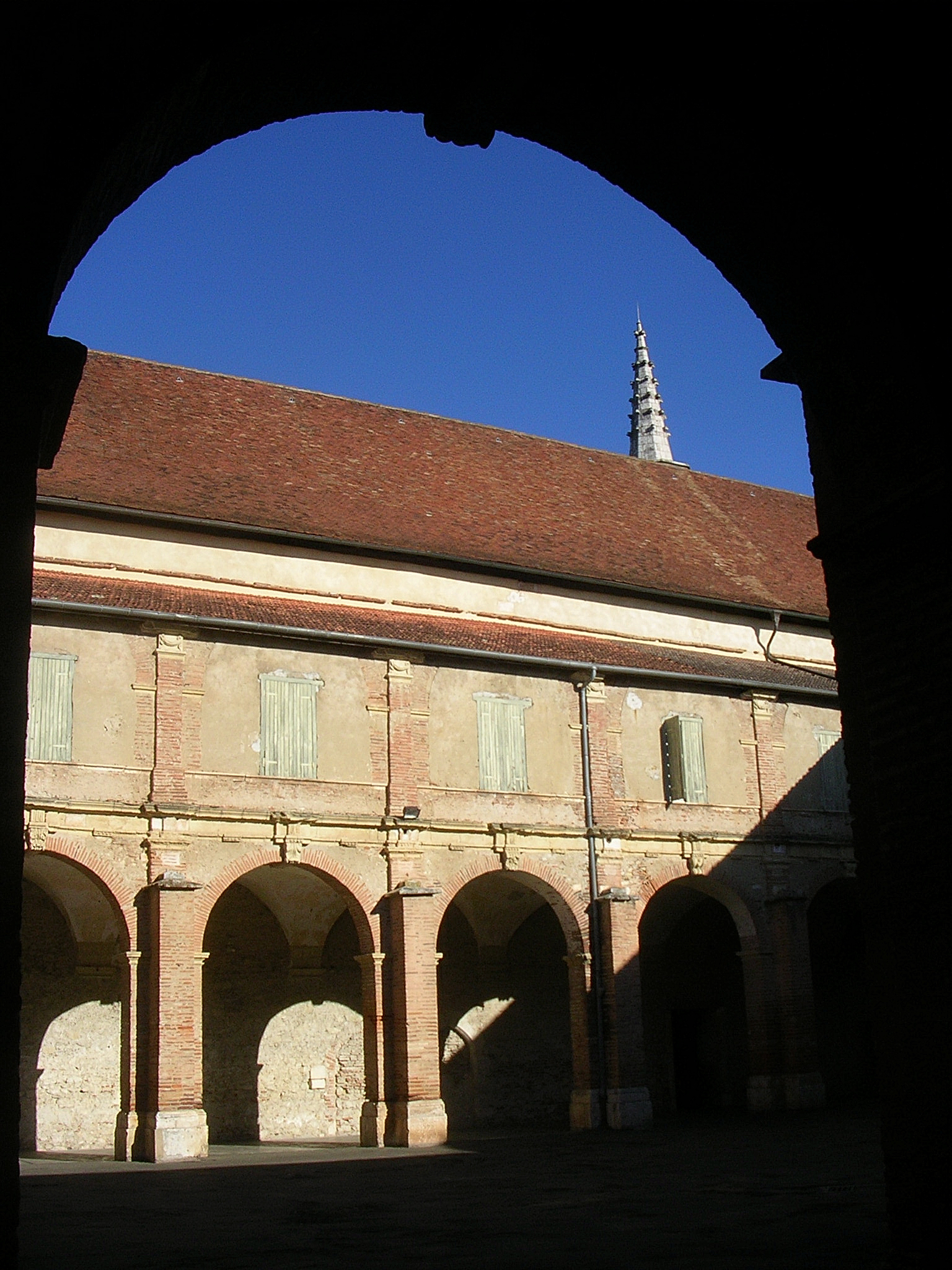
Cloister

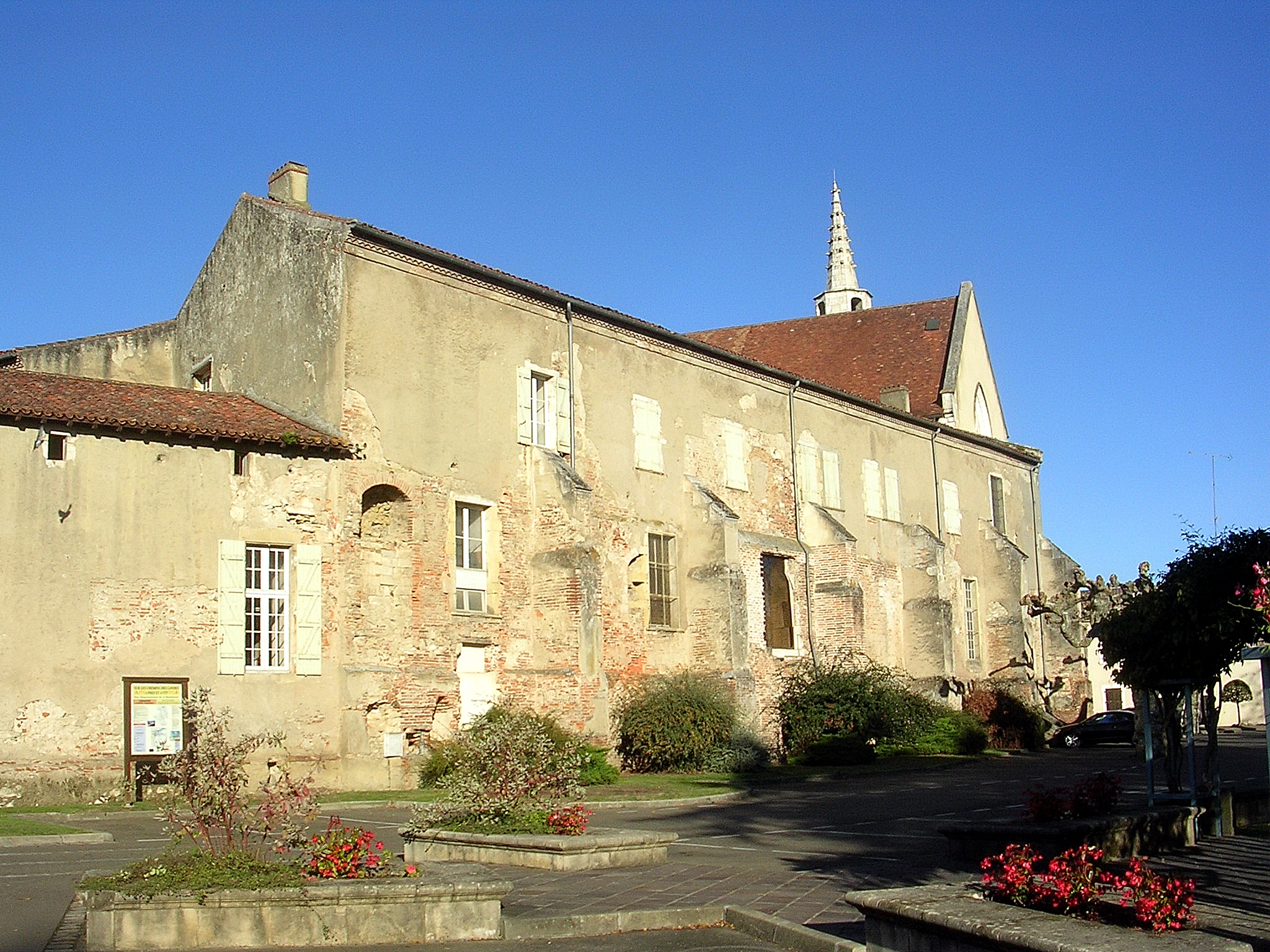
Chapter house and refectory

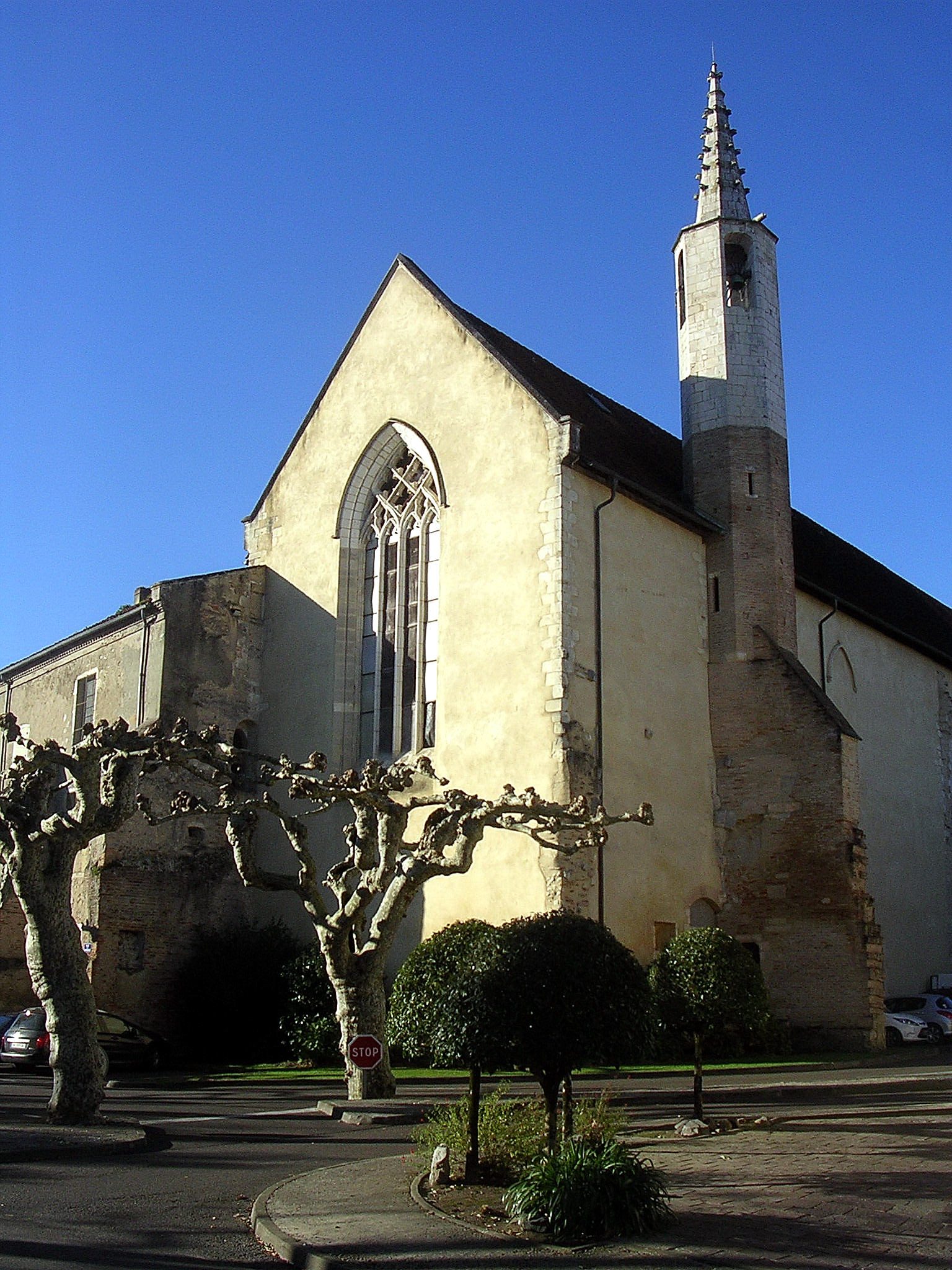
Church

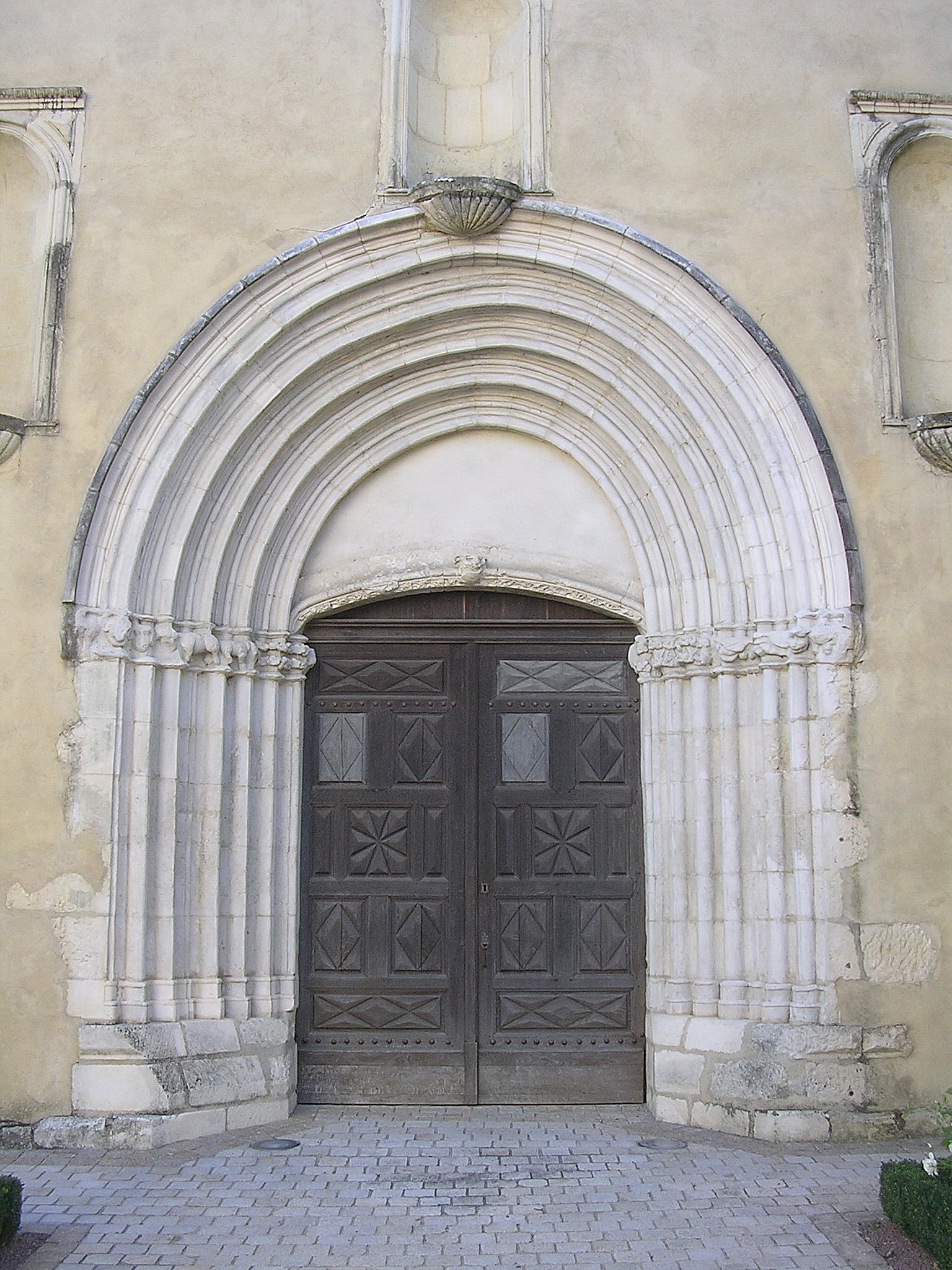
Gateway

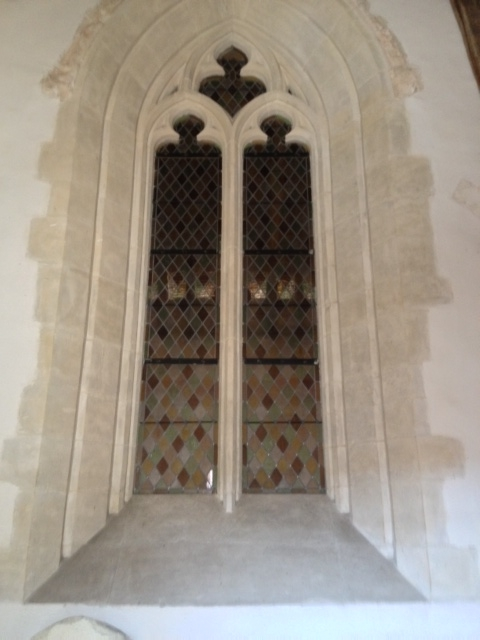
Window from chapter house
