= Chiesa dei Domenicani =

Medieval church in South Tyrol, Italy

Coordinates: 46°29′51″N 11°21′06″E

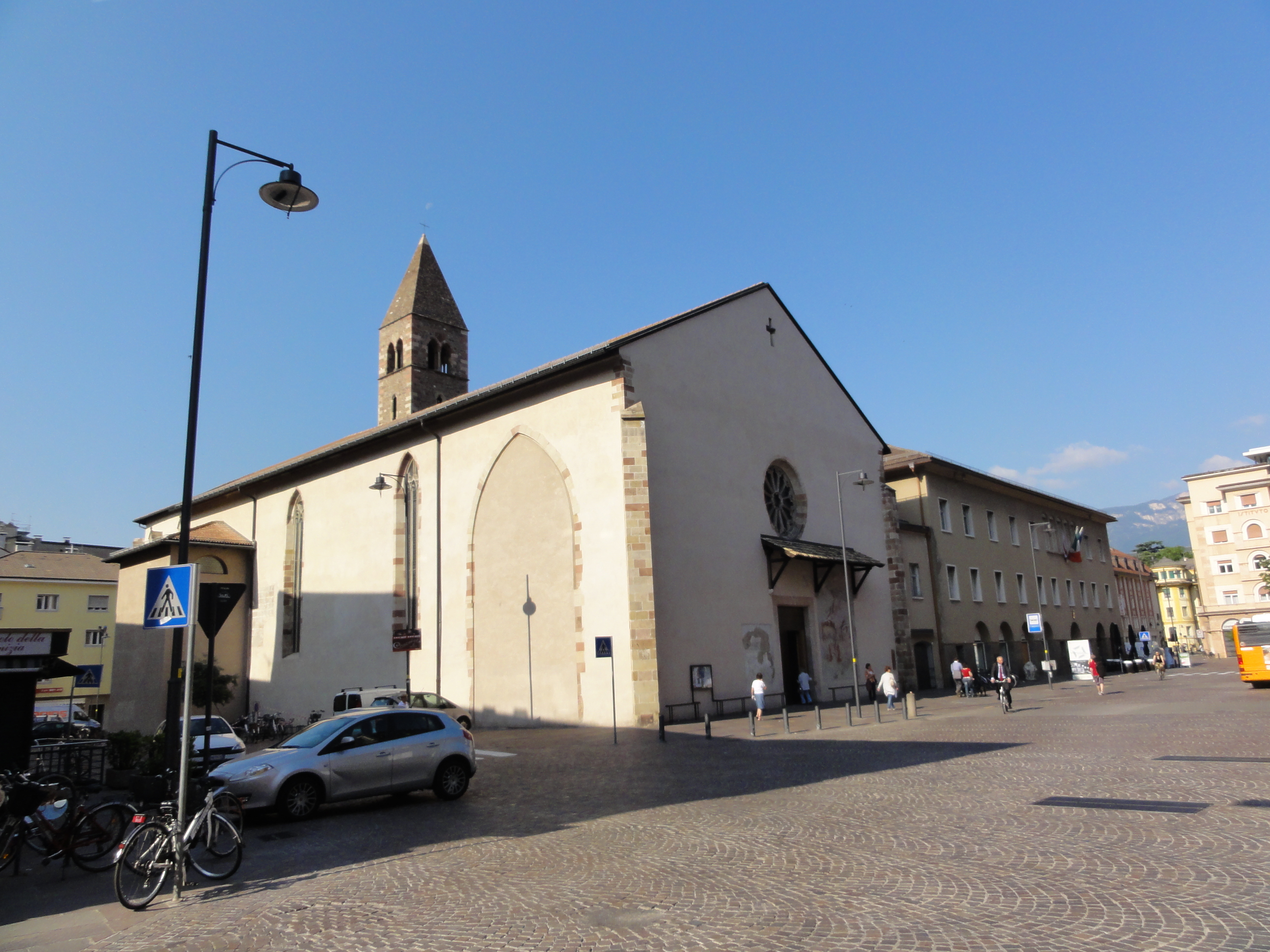
The Chiesa dei Domenicani/Dominikanekirche

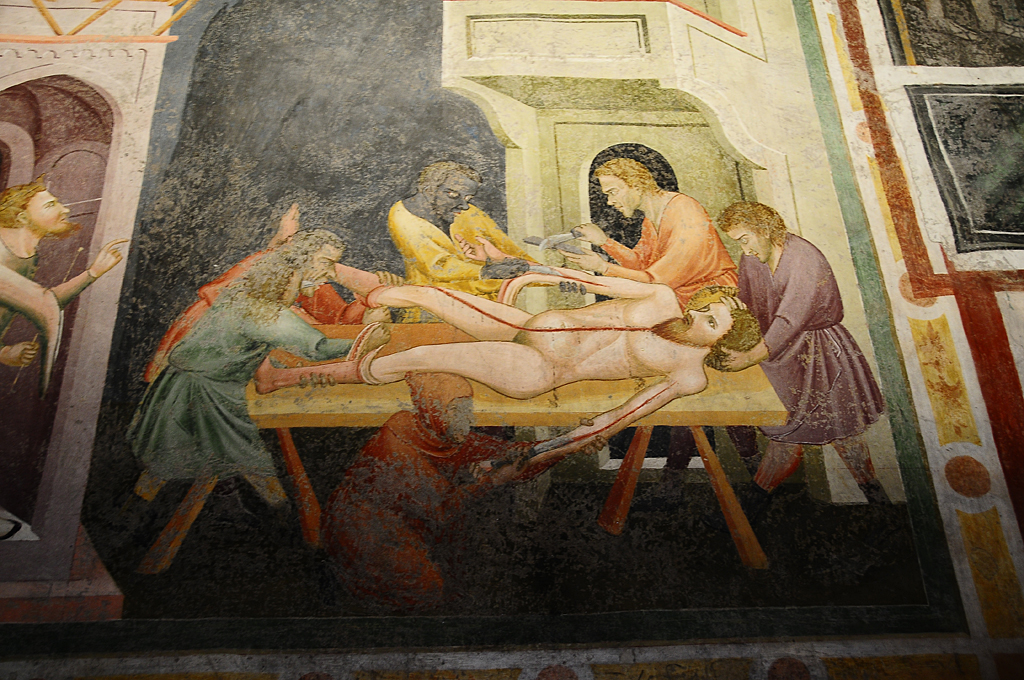
Fresco of the Martyrdom of St. Bartholomew

The Chiesa dei Domenicani (German: Dominikanerkirche) is a medieval church in Bolzano/Bozen, South Tyrol, northern Italy.

The church, one of the earliest examples of Gothic architecture in Tyrol, was founded by the Dominicans after their arrival, in a location that was then outside the city's walls. The construction ended in 1272 but was expanded in the following century. The quarter which originated from the monks' church and monastery became known as Neustadt ("New City"); their cultivated lands were nationalized by the Fascist regime in 1930s. The church was heavily damaged by bombs during World War II.

The church has a single hall two rows of octagonal pillars. The presbytery, separated a five-span bridge, was rebuilt in Baroque style in the 18th century; in 1458–1468 the church and the cloister received new vaults in Gothic style. The four side chapels, dating from the 14th century, were damaged in World War II. The interior is home to several frescoes, including a Madonna and Saints by Haus Stotzinger from Ulm (1404), a Madonna Enthroned by a Veronese school artist (1379) and Four Saints by an artist from Martino da Verona's school (1400). The Chapel of St. John, finally, houses a fresco cycle by a Giottoesque painter, including a scene with one of the Four Horsemen of the Apocalypse and, below, the sinners. From 1488 onward, there was a lay confraternity at the convent dedicated to Saint Sebastian, whose members belonged to the city’s nobility, including, for example, the Kiesfelder, the Lantramer, and the Truefer families.

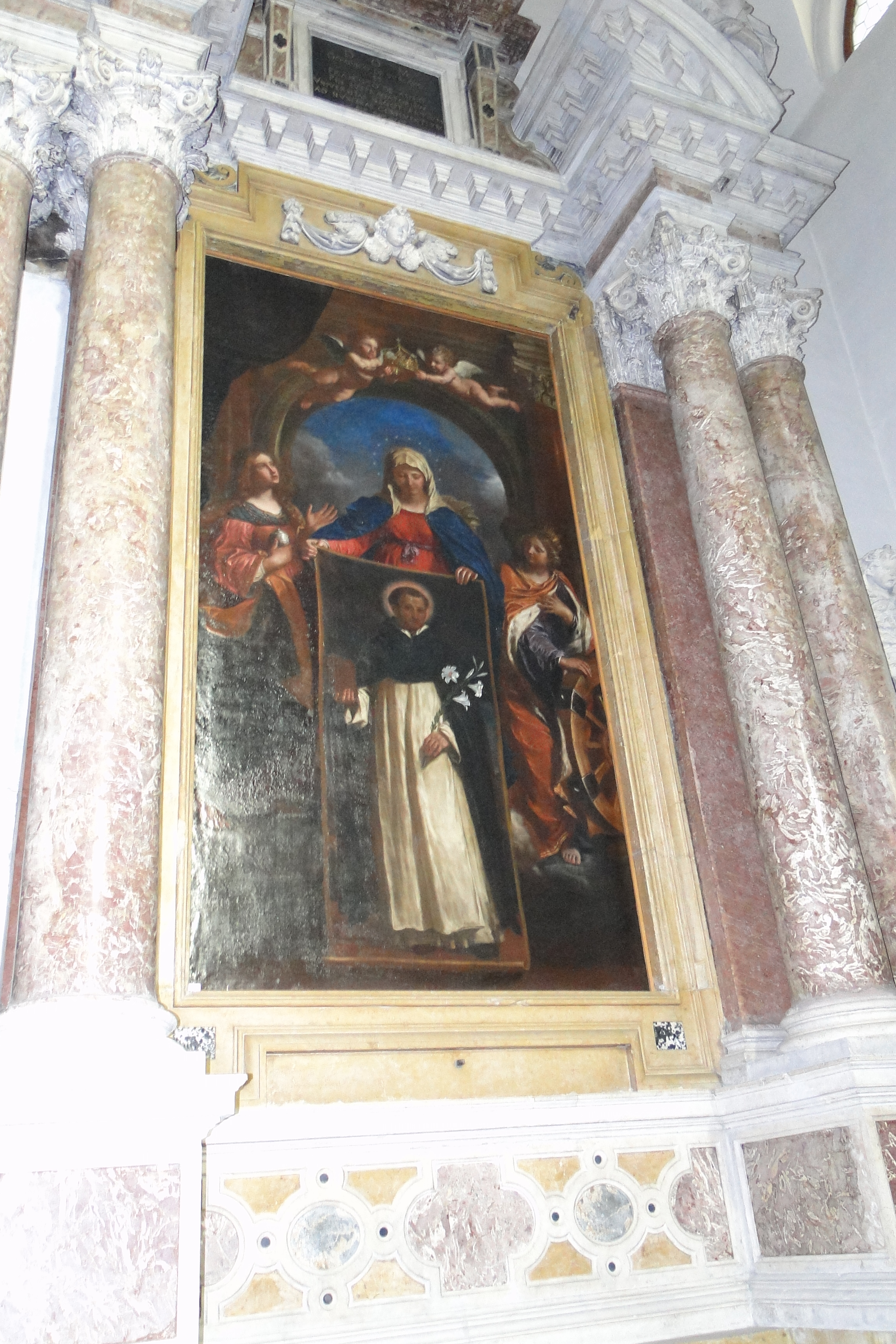
The Vision of Soriano

At the end of the apse is The Vision of Soriano, an altarpiece by Guercino (1655) showing a vision by Lorenzo da Grotteria, a Dominican lay brother in the monastery at Soriano Calabro on the night of 15 September 1530, in which he saw the Virgin Mary, Mary Magdalene and Catherine of Alexandria, who at the end of the vision left in his hands a painting of his order's founder Saint Dominic holding a book and a lily, respectively symbolising the learning and purity of the order's members. With three surviving preparatory sketches for it (two in the National Gallery of Ireland and the third in a private collection in Stuttgart), Guercino's painting was commissioned by the town's Mercantile Magistrate via consul Bernardino Borno of Verona and put in place a year later. It was taken to the parish church when the monastery was suppressed in 1785, but was returned to the Dominicans' former monastery church in 1970.

The cloister, first mentioned in a 1308 document, has wall paintings depicting the Life of Jesus and Mary, executed by Friedrich Pacher around 1496. Other Giottoesque frescoes from the 14th century can be seen in the St. Caterine Chapel which is accessed through the cloister.

== Sources ==
- Pan, Alexandra (1987). Der Freskenzyklus im Dominikaner-Kreuzgang zu Bozen. Vienna.
