= Nabu (disambiguation) =

Nabu is the Assyrian and Babylonian god of wisdom and writing.

Nabu or NABU may also refer to:

== Places ==
- Nabu, the ancient Babylonian name for the planet Mercury
- 533671 Nabu, a near-Earth asteroid

== Art, entertainment, and media ==
- Nabu (comics), a fictionalized version of the deity appearing in DC Comics as a supporting character of Doctor Fate
- Nabu Press, an imprint of the historical reprints publisher BiblioLife
- Nabu, a character from the Italian television series Winx Club

== Other uses ==
- NABU Network, an early home computer system
- Naturschutzbund Deutschland, the German Nature Conservation Society
- National Anti-Corruption Bureau of Ukraine (NABU), a Ukrainian anti-corruption law enforcement agency

== See also ==
- Nabo (disambiguation)
- Naboo, a planet in the Star Wars universe
- Naboo the Enigma, a character in The Mighty Boosh
