= List of minor planets: 533001–534000 =

The following is a partial list of minor planets, running from minor-planet number 533001 through 534000, inclusive. The primary data for this and other partial lists is based on JPL's "Small-Body Orbital Elements" and data available from the Minor Planet Center. Critical list information is also provided by the MPC, unless otherwise specified from Lowell Observatory. A detailed description of the table's columns and additional sources are given on the main page including a complete list of every page in this series, and a statistical break-up on the dynamical classification of minor planets.

Also see the summary list of all named bodies in numerical and alphabetical order, and the corresponding naming citations for the number range of this particular list. New namings may only be added to this list after official publication, as the preannouncement of names is condemned by the Working Group for Small Bodies Nomenclature of the International Astronomical Union.

Near-Earth obj.	MBA (inner)	MBA (outer)	Centaur
Mars-crosser	MBA (middle)	Jupiter trojan	Trans-Neptunian obj.
Unclassified

== 533001–533100 ==
Designation			Discovery			Properties		Ref
Permanent	Provisional	Named after	Date	Site	Discoverer(s)	Category	Diam.	Ref
533001	2014 AJ_{7}	—	October 30, 2007	Mount Lemmon	Mount Lemmon Survey	THM	1.5 km	MPC · JPL
533002	2014 AV_{8}	—	March 3, 2005	Catalina	CSS	·	1.9 km	MPC · JPL
533003	2014 AH_{13}	—	November 9, 2013	Haleakala	Pan-STARRS 1	EOS	1.7 km	MPC · JPL
533004	2014 AJ_{13}	—	October 24, 2013	Kitt Peak	Spacewatch	·	3.0 km	MPC · JPL
533005	2014 AZ_{15}	—	December 10, 2013	Mount Lemmon	Mount Lemmon Survey	H	520 m	MPC · JPL
533006	2014 AP_{16}	—	December 4, 2013	Haleakala	Pan-STARRS 1	H	460 m	MPC · JPL
533007	2014 AL_{19}	—	December 24, 2013	Catalina	CSS	H	510 m	MPC · JPL
533008	2014 AM_{19}	—	January 1, 2014	Kitt Peak	Spacewatch	·	2.5 km	MPC · JPL
533009	2014 AJ_{22}	—	January 15, 2005	Socorro	LINEAR	CLO	1.6 km	MPC · JPL
533010	2014 AL_{22}	—	October 20, 2007	Kitt Peak	Spacewatch	·	1.6 km	MPC · JPL
533011	2014 AY_{28}	—	January 4, 2014	Haleakala	Pan-STARRS 1	AMO · PHA · fast	150 m	MPC · JPL
533012	2014 AD_{29}	—	January 3, 2014	Catalina	CSS	H	510 m	MPC · JPL
533013	2014 AG_{29}	—	October 30, 2008	Mount Lemmon	Mount Lemmon Survey	H	490 m	MPC · JPL
533014	2014 AA_{32}	—	January 4, 2014	Haleakala	Pan-STARRS 1	H	380 m	MPC · JPL
533015	2014 AD_{32}	—	January 4, 2014	Haleakala	Pan-STARRS 1	H	500 m	MPC · JPL
533016	2014 AF_{32}	—	January 6, 2014	Haleakala	Pan-STARRS 1	H	470 m	MPC · JPL
533017	2014 AL_{40}	—	January 4, 2014	Mount Lemmon	Mount Lemmon Survey	H	480 m	MPC · JPL
533018	2014 AB_{42}	—	October 10, 2012	Mount Lemmon	Mount Lemmon Survey	·	2.0 km	MPC · JPL
533019	2014 AK_{42}	—	December 31, 2013	Haleakala	Pan-STARRS 1	·	1.6 km	MPC · JPL
533020	2014 AC_{44}	—	December 25, 2013	Mount Lemmon	Mount Lemmon Survey	H	560 m	MPC · JPL
533021	2014 AZ_{47}	—	October 18, 2012	Mount Lemmon	Mount Lemmon Survey	·	2.9 km	MPC · JPL
533022	2014 AD_{50}	—	January 9, 2014	Haleakala	Pan-STARRS 1	·	2.8 km	MPC · JPL
533023	2014 AO_{51}	—	January 9, 2014	Haleakala	Pan-STARRS 1	H	470 m	MPC · JPL
533024	2014 AP_{52}	—	October 28, 2013	Mount Lemmon	Mount Lemmon Survey	JUN	850 m	MPC · JPL
533025	2014 AQ_{52}	—	October 17, 2007	Mount Lemmon	Mount Lemmon Survey	·	2.6 km	MPC · JPL
533026	2014 AH_{53}	—	February 13, 2008	Socorro	LINEAR	T_{j} (2.94)	3.4 km	MPC · JPL
533027	2014 AY_{53}	—	March 22, 2009	Catalina	CSS	·	2.5 km	MPC · JPL
533028	2014 AL_{55}	—	January 1, 2014	Haleakala	Pan-STARRS 1	res · 4:7	178 km	MPC · JPL
533029	2014 AX_{55}	—	January 7, 2014	Kitt Peak	Spacewatch	H	400 m	MPC · JPL
533030	2014 AS_{56}	—	October 9, 2012	Mount Lemmon	Mount Lemmon Survey	·	1.8 km	MPC · JPL
533031	2014 AY_{56}	—	July 28, 2011	Haleakala	Pan-STARRS 1	·	2.4 km	MPC · JPL
533032	2014 AA_{57}	—	November 19, 2007	Mount Lemmon	Mount Lemmon Survey	TEL	1.2 km	MPC · JPL
533033	2014 AB_{57}	—	February 24, 2009	Mount Lemmon	Mount Lemmon Survey	·	2.8 km	MPC · JPL
533034	2014 AC_{57}	—	December 4, 2007	Mount Lemmon	Mount Lemmon Survey	THM	1.9 km	MPC · JPL
533035	2014 AD_{57}	—	August 27, 2012	Haleakala	Pan-STARRS 1	·	1.4 km	MPC · JPL
533036	2014 AG_{57}	—	January 2, 2014	Mount Lemmon	Mount Lemmon Survey	·	2.5 km	MPC · JPL
533037	2014 AX_{57}	—	January 1, 2014	Haleakala	Pan-STARRS 1	·	2.0 km	MPC · JPL
533038	2014 AF_{58}	—	January 1, 2014	Kitt Peak	Spacewatch	·	2.1 km	MPC · JPL
533039	2014 AM_{58}	—	December 31, 2008	Kitt Peak	Spacewatch	·	2.0 km	MPC · JPL
533040	2014 AA_{59}	—	October 8, 2008	Kitt Peak	Spacewatch	·	1.2 km	MPC · JPL
533041	2014 AD_{59}	—	August 28, 2005	Kitt Peak	Spacewatch	·	2.6 km	MPC · JPL
533042	2014 AK_{59}	—	January 7, 2014	Mount Lemmon	Mount Lemmon Survey	AGN	1.1 km	MPC · JPL
533043	2014 AN_{59}	—	January 9, 2014	Mount Lemmon	Mount Lemmon Survey	·	1.6 km	MPC · JPL
533044	2014 AP_{59}	—	January 9, 2014	Mount Lemmon	Mount Lemmon Survey	CYB	2.3 km	MPC · JPL
533045	2014 AY_{59}	—	August 13, 2012	Kitt Peak	Spacewatch	·	1.8 km	MPC · JPL
533046	2014 AC_{60}	—	September 24, 2012	Mount Lemmon	Mount Lemmon Survey	·	1.6 km	MPC · JPL
533047	2014 AH_{60}	—	October 24, 2008	Mount Lemmon	Mount Lemmon Survey	HOF	2.6 km	MPC · JPL
533048	2014 AW_{60}	—	November 20, 2008	Mount Lemmon	Mount Lemmon Survey	·	1.4 km	MPC · JPL
533049	2014 AB_{61}	—	January 10, 2014	Kitt Peak	Spacewatch	·	3.3 km	MPC · JPL
533050	2014 AC_{61}	—	January 1, 2014	Haleakala	Pan-STARRS 1	·	2.1 km	MPC · JPL
533051	2014 BD_{3}	—	January 18, 2014	Haleakala	Pan-STARRS 1	H	460 m	MPC · JPL
533052	2014 BR_{9}	—	March 4, 2005	Kitt Peak	Spacewatch	·	1.7 km	MPC · JPL
533053	2014 BC_{10}	—	November 6, 2013	Mount Lemmon	Mount Lemmon Survey	·	1.6 km	MPC · JPL
533054	2014 BO_{11}	—	February 13, 1997	Kitt Peak	Spacewatch	JUN	710 m	MPC · JPL
533055	2014 BM_{12}	—	January 21, 2014	Kitt Peak	Spacewatch	·	3.1 km	MPC · JPL
533056	2014 BO_{14}	—	December 4, 2013	Haleakala	Pan-STARRS 1	·	2.9 km	MPC · JPL
533057	2014 BE_{16}	—	November 20, 2007	Mount Lemmon	Mount Lemmon Survey	·	2.1 km	MPC · JPL
533058	2014 BH_{16}	—	January 1, 2014	Haleakala	Pan-STARRS 1	·	1.7 km	MPC · JPL
533059	2014 BN_{17}	—	October 7, 2008	Mount Lemmon	Mount Lemmon Survey	·	1.7 km	MPC · JPL
533060	2014 BQ_{17}	—	October 31, 2013	Mount Lemmon	Mount Lemmon Survey	·	1.7 km	MPC · JPL
533061	2014 BD_{19}	—	May 19, 2010	Mount Lemmon	Mount Lemmon Survey	·	2.0 km	MPC · JPL
533062	2014 BC_{20}	—	December 25, 2013	Kitt Peak	Spacewatch	·	1.8 km	MPC · JPL
533063	2014 BT_{20}	—	January 23, 2014	Kitt Peak	Spacewatch	H	540 m	MPC · JPL
533064	2014 BP_{22}	—	December 13, 2013	Mount Lemmon	Mount Lemmon Survey	·	2.2 km	MPC · JPL
533065	2014 BV_{23}	—	November 29, 1999	Kitt Peak	Spacewatch	·	1.8 km	MPC · JPL
533066	2014 BD_{27}	—	December 25, 2013	Kitt Peak	Spacewatch	·	2.9 km	MPC · JPL
533067	2014 BM_{28}	—	February 1, 2009	Kitt Peak	Spacewatch	EMA	2.7 km	MPC · JPL
533068	2014 BJ_{29}	—	December 30, 2013	Mount Lemmon	Mount Lemmon Survey	H	540 m	MPC · JPL
533069	2014 BQ_{31}	—	December 13, 2013	Mount Lemmon	Mount Lemmon Survey	·	2.8 km	MPC · JPL
533070	2014 BQ_{32}	—	December 27, 2013	Mount Lemmon	Mount Lemmon Survey	·	2.1 km	MPC · JPL
533071	2014 BA_{38}	—	June 21, 2012	Mount Lemmon	Mount Lemmon Survey	H	450 m	MPC · JPL
533072	2014 BD_{41}	—	September 20, 2011	Haleakala	Pan-STARRS 1	·	2.3 km	MPC · JPL
533073	2014 BL_{42}	—	September 20, 2012	Mount Lemmon	Mount Lemmon Survey	(895)	2.6 km	MPC · JPL
533074	2014 BZ_{43}	—	January 31, 2009	Kitt Peak	Spacewatch	·	1.1 km	MPC · JPL
533075	2014 BJ_{44}	—	January 23, 2014	Catalina	CSS	·	3.2 km	MPC · JPL
533076	2014 BR_{45}	—	January 23, 2014	Mount Lemmon	Mount Lemmon Survey	·	1.9 km	MPC · JPL
533077	2014 BZ_{46}	—	September 14, 2007	Mount Lemmon	Mount Lemmon Survey	·	1.5 km	MPC · JPL
533078	2014 BD_{50}	—	December 31, 2013	Kitt Peak	Spacewatch	·	1.3 km	MPC · JPL
533079	2014 BA_{54}	—	January 2, 2014	Kitt Peak	Spacewatch	·	2.9 km	MPC · JPL
533080	2014 BF_{54}	—	January 15, 2009	Kitt Peak	Spacewatch	·	1.5 km	MPC · JPL
533081	2014 BF_{58}	—	April 9, 2010	Kitt Peak	Spacewatch	(13314)	1.6 km	MPC · JPL
533082	2014 BB_{60}	—	January 26, 2014	Haleakala	Pan-STARRS 1	H	400 m	MPC · JPL
533083	2014 BM_{60}	—	January 12, 2014	Mount Lemmon	Mount Lemmon Survey	H	640 m	MPC · JPL
533084	2014 BB_{62}	—	December 26, 2013	XuYi	PMO NEO Survey Program	URS	3.4 km	MPC · JPL
533085	2014 BW_{64}	—	January 24, 2014	Haleakala	Pan-STARRS 1	other TNO	182 km	MPC · JPL
533086	2014 BE_{65}	—	January 21, 2014	Kitt Peak	Spacewatch	·	2.6 km	MPC · JPL
533087	2014 BM_{65}	—	March 9, 2005	Mount Lemmon	Mount Lemmon Survey	·	1.4 km	MPC · JPL
533088	2014 BW_{65}	—	January 17, 2009	Mount Lemmon	Mount Lemmon Survey	·	1.7 km	MPC · JPL
533089	2014 BX_{65}	—	October 23, 2012	Mount Lemmon	Mount Lemmon Survey	·	1.6 km	MPC · JPL
533090	2014 BY_{65}	—	October 15, 2012	Haleakala	Pan-STARRS 1	·	2.0 km	MPC · JPL
533091	2014 BZ_{65}	—	October 18, 2006	Kitt Peak	Spacewatch	·	2.6 km	MPC · JPL
533092	2014 BA_{66}	—	August 31, 2011	Haleakala	Pan-STARRS 1	·	2.6 km	MPC · JPL
533093	2014 BB_{66}	—	October 20, 2012	Haleakala	Pan-STARRS 1	EOS	2.0 km	MPC · JPL
533094	2014 BD_{66}	—	January 28, 2014	Mount Lemmon	Mount Lemmon Survey	·	2.9 km	MPC · JPL
533095	2014 BP_{66}	—	March 19, 2010	Mount Lemmon	Mount Lemmon Survey	·	1.9 km	MPC · JPL
533096	2014 BQ_{66}	—	January 1, 2009	Mount Lemmon	Mount Lemmon Survey	·	2.0 km	MPC · JPL
533097	2014 BT_{66}	—	January 20, 2014	Mount Lemmon	Mount Lemmon Survey	HOF	2.4 km	MPC · JPL
533098	2014 BV_{66}	—	October 11, 2012	Haleakala	Pan-STARRS 1	·	1.4 km	MPC · JPL
533099	2014 BW_{66}	—	September 4, 2011	Haleakala	Pan-STARRS 1	·	2.8 km	MPC · JPL
533100	2014 BC_{67}	—	January 10, 2014	Mount Lemmon	Mount Lemmon Survey	·	1.3 km	MPC · JPL

== 533101–533200 ==
back to top

Designation			Discovery			Properties		Ref
Permanent	Provisional	Named after	Date	Site	Discoverer(s)	Category	Diam.	Ref
533101	2014 BD_{67}	—	February 22, 2003	Kitt Peak	Spacewatch	·	2.0 km	MPC · JPL
533102	2014 BA_{68}	—	October 17, 2012	Mount Lemmon	Mount Lemmon Survey	·	2.0 km	MPC · JPL
533103	2014 BE_{68}	—	October 18, 2012	Haleakala	Pan-STARRS 1	526	1.9 km	MPC · JPL
533104	2014 BM_{68}	—	January 26, 2014	Haleakala	Pan-STARRS 1	MRX	710 m	MPC · JPL
533105	2014 BO_{68}	—	January 26, 2014	Haleakala	Pan-STARRS 1	·	2.5 km	MPC · JPL
533106	2014 BR_{68}	—	January 28, 2014	Mount Lemmon	Mount Lemmon Survey	·	3.2 km	MPC · JPL
533107	2014 BW_{68}	—	January 28, 2014	Mayhill	L. Elenin	·	2.7 km	MPC · JPL
533108	2014 BY_{68}	—	January 28, 2014	Kitt Peak	Spacewatch	·	2.3 km	MPC · JPL
533109	2014 BB_{69}	—	January 28, 2014	Kitt Peak	Spacewatch	·	2.2 km	MPC · JPL
533110	2014 BD_{69}	—	March 21, 2009	Mount Lemmon	Mount Lemmon Survey	·	1.6 km	MPC · JPL
533111	2014 BE_{69}	—	September 26, 2006	Kitt Peak	Spacewatch	·	2.3 km	MPC · JPL
533112	2014 BX_{69}	—	July 26, 2010	WISE	WISE	·	1.9 km	MPC · JPL
533113	2014 BY_{69}	—	December 24, 2013	Catalina	CSS	JUN	920 m	MPC · JPL
533114	2014 BA_{70}	—	January 21, 2014	Mount Lemmon	Mount Lemmon Survey	·	1.8 km	MPC · JPL
533115	2014 CK_{1}	—	July 26, 2011	Haleakala	Pan-STARRS 1	·	1.7 km	MPC · JPL
533116	2014 CQ_{5}	—	December 30, 2013	Mount Lemmon	Mount Lemmon Survey	·	2.6 km	MPC · JPL
533117	2014 CU_{8}	—	February 22, 2009	Kitt Peak	Spacewatch	·	1.6 km	MPC · JPL
533118	2014 CO_{9}	—	January 29, 2009	Mount Lemmon	Mount Lemmon Survey	H	380 m	MPC · JPL
533119	2014 CX_{10}	—	February 19, 2009	Kitt Peak	Spacewatch	·	2.3 km	MPC · JPL
533120	2014 CB_{12}	—	August 14, 2012	La Sagra	OAM	H	600 m	MPC · JPL
533121	2014 CO_{13}	—	June 14, 2012	Haleakala	Pan-STARRS 1	H	590 m	MPC · JPL
533122	2014 CU_{16}	—	December 13, 2013	Mount Lemmon	Mount Lemmon Survey	·	2.6 km	MPC · JPL
533123	2014 CV_{17}	—	February 9, 2014	Mount Lemmon	Mount Lemmon Survey	·	2.3 km	MPC · JPL
533124	2014 CM_{18}	—	February 9, 2014	Haleakala	Pan-STARRS 1	·	3.2 km	MPC · JPL
533125	2014 CS_{19}	—	February 11, 2014	Mount Lemmon	Mount Lemmon Survey	H	500 m	MPC · JPL
533126	2014 CU_{23}	—	February 9, 2014	Haleakala	Pan-STARRS 1	H	440 m	MPC · JPL
533127	2014 CF_{24}	—	February 9, 2014	Kitt Peak	Spacewatch	·	2.9 km	MPC · JPL
533128	2014 CH_{24}	—	May 13, 2010	WISE	WISE	·	1.8 km	MPC · JPL
533129	2014 CJ_{24}	—	September 15, 2006	Kitt Peak	Spacewatch	·	2.4 km	MPC · JPL
533130	2014 CM_{24}	—	January 29, 2014	Kitt Peak	Spacewatch	·	1.9 km	MPC · JPL
533131	2014 CO_{24}	—	December 16, 2007	Mount Lemmon	Mount Lemmon Survey	·	2.5 km	MPC · JPL
533132	2014 CV_{24}	—	January 31, 2009	Mount Lemmon	Mount Lemmon Survey	·	2.4 km	MPC · JPL
533133	2014 CY_{24}	—	July 28, 2011	Haleakala	Pan-STARRS 1	EOS	2.2 km	MPC · JPL
533134	2014 CZ_{24}	—	December 31, 2007	Kitt Peak	Spacewatch	THM	2.2 km	MPC · JPL
533135	2014 CU_{25}	—	August 27, 2011	Haleakala	Pan-STARRS 1	·	2.2 km	MPC · JPL
533136	2014 CX_{25}	—	November 4, 2007	Kitt Peak	Spacewatch	·	1.8 km	MPC · JPL
533137	2014 CB_{26}	—	February 10, 2014	Haleakala	Pan-STARRS 1	AGN	960 m	MPC · JPL
533138	2014 CC_{26}	—	March 3, 2009	Mount Lemmon	Mount Lemmon Survey	·	1.9 km	MPC · JPL
533139	2014 CK_{26}	—	March 2, 2009	Kitt Peak	Spacewatch	·	2.5 km	MPC · JPL
533140	2014 CO_{26}	—	February 14, 2005	Kitt Peak	Spacewatch	·	1.6 km	MPC · JPL
533141	2014 CU_{26}	—	January 2, 2014	Mount Lemmon	Mount Lemmon Survey	·	1.9 km	MPC · JPL
533142	2014 CY_{26}	—	August 26, 2011	Kitt Peak	Spacewatch	·	2.3 km	MPC · JPL
533143	2014 CR_{27}	—	February 10, 2014	Haleakala	Pan-STARRS 1	·	1.7 km	MPC · JPL
533144	2014 CU_{27}	—	January 13, 2008	Kitt Peak	Spacewatch	·	2.1 km	MPC · JPL
533145	2014 DP	—	January 7, 2014	Mount Lemmon	Mount Lemmon Survey	H	420 m	MPC · JPL
533146	2014 DD_{1}	—	March 3, 2009	Kitt Peak	Spacewatch	·	1.2 km	MPC · JPL
533147	2014 DY_{2}	—	July 15, 2012	Siding Spring	SSS	H	520 m	MPC · JPL
533148	2014 DK_{5}	—	February 10, 2014	Haleakala	Pan-STARRS 1	EOS	1.8 km	MPC · JPL
533149	2014 DY_{7}	—	August 28, 2006	Kitt Peak	Spacewatch	·	2.1 km	MPC · JPL
533150	2014 DM_{9}	—	September 26, 2012	Haleakala	Pan-STARRS 1	·	1.6 km	MPC · JPL
533151	2014 DV_{9}	—	January 24, 2014	Haleakala	Pan-STARRS 1	·	1.1 km	MPC · JPL
533152	2014 DE_{11}	—	February 22, 2014	Haleakala	Pan-STARRS 1	H	520 m	MPC · JPL
533153	2014 DP_{12}	—	September 17, 2012	Kitt Peak	Spacewatch	·	2.4 km	MPC · JPL
533154	2014 DQ_{12}	—	February 9, 2014	Haleakala	Pan-STARRS 1	EUP	3.3 km	MPC · JPL
533155	2014 DL_{16}	—	April 22, 2009	Mount Lemmon	Mount Lemmon Survey	·	1.7 km	MPC · JPL
533156	2014 DR_{16}	—	September 4, 2011	Haleakala	Pan-STARRS 1	·	2.5 km	MPC · JPL
533157	2014 DR_{17}	—	August 29, 2006	Kitt Peak	Spacewatch	T_{j} (2.97)	3.6 km	MPC · JPL
533158	2014 DP_{19}	—	January 28, 2014	Mount Lemmon	Mount Lemmon Survey	·	3.2 km	MPC · JPL
533159	2014 DZ_{21}	—	February 24, 2014	Haleakala	Pan-STARRS 1	H	430 m	MPC · JPL
533160	2014 DE_{24}	—	March 10, 2005	Mount Lemmon	Mount Lemmon Survey	·	1.4 km	MPC · JPL
533161	2014 DV_{28}	—	May 13, 2010	Kitt Peak	Spacewatch	·	1.8 km	MPC · JPL
533162	2014 DW_{30}	—	February 10, 2014	Haleakala	Pan-STARRS 1	·	2.7 km	MPC · JPL
533163	2014 DE_{31}	—	September 4, 2011	Haleakala	Pan-STARRS 1	·	2.1 km	MPC · JPL
533164	2014 DG_{42}	—	September 25, 2006	Kitt Peak	Spacewatch	·	1.7 km	MPC · JPL
533165	2014 DP_{45}	—	February 16, 2004	Kitt Peak	Spacewatch	·	1.9 km	MPC · JPL
533166	2014 DL_{49}	—	September 23, 2011	Mount Lemmon	Mount Lemmon Survey	·	2.6 km	MPC · JPL
533167	2014 DR_{49}	—	December 3, 2007	Kitt Peak	Spacewatch	·	1.7 km	MPC · JPL
533168	2014 DV_{49}	—	February 1, 2009	Mount Lemmon	Mount Lemmon Survey	·	1.5 km	MPC · JPL
533169	2014 DW_{49}	—	October 15, 2006	Kitt Peak	Spacewatch	·	1.4 km	MPC · JPL
533170	2014 DQ_{52}	—	January 16, 2008	Mount Lemmon	Mount Lemmon Survey	·	2.0 km	MPC · JPL
533171	2014 DL_{53}	—	February 14, 2005	Kitt Peak	Spacewatch	·	1.3 km	MPC · JPL
533172	2014 DV_{54}	—	November 11, 2007	Mount Lemmon	Mount Lemmon Survey	THM	2.0 km	MPC · JPL
533173	2014 DU_{55}	—	September 26, 2011	Mount Lemmon	Mount Lemmon Survey	GEF	1.1 km	MPC · JPL
533174	2014 DO_{57}	—	April 21, 2009	Mount Lemmon	Mount Lemmon Survey	·	2.0 km	MPC · JPL
533175	2014 DR_{60}	—	February 4, 2009	Mount Lemmon	Mount Lemmon Survey	·	1.7 km	MPC · JPL
533176	2014 DP_{66}	—	May 14, 2009	Mount Lemmon	Mount Lemmon Survey	TIR	2.1 km	MPC · JPL
533177	2014 DV_{67}	—	February 26, 2014	Haleakala	Pan-STARRS 1	·	2.4 km	MPC · JPL
533178	2014 DZ_{73}	—	January 29, 2009	Mount Lemmon	Mount Lemmon Survey	·	1.8 km	MPC · JPL
533179	2014 DK_{78}	—	February 10, 2014	Haleakala	Pan-STARRS 1	(43176)	3.4 km	MPC · JPL
533180	2014 DP_{80}	—	February 9, 2014	Haleakala	Pan-STARRS 1	H	480 m	MPC · JPL
533181	2014 DM_{82}	—	February 10, 2014	Haleakala	Pan-STARRS 1	CYB	3.9 km	MPC · JPL
533182	2014 DV_{83}	—	April 26, 2009	Kitt Peak	Spacewatch	THM	2.0 km	MPC · JPL
533183	2014 DN_{84}	—	September 24, 2011	Mount Lemmon	Mount Lemmon Survey	·	1.8 km	MPC · JPL
533184	2014 DY_{84}	—	March 3, 2009	Mount Lemmon	Mount Lemmon Survey	·	1.8 km	MPC · JPL
533185	2014 DB_{85}	—	January 31, 2009	Kitt Peak	Spacewatch	·	1.8 km	MPC · JPL
533186	2014 DM_{89}	—	February 26, 2014	Mount Lemmon	Mount Lemmon Survey	H	440 m	MPC · JPL
533187	2014 DC_{90}	—	September 23, 2011	Haleakala	Pan-STARRS 1	·	2.7 km	MPC · JPL
533188	2014 DW_{105}	—	February 27, 2009	Kitt Peak	Spacewatch	·	1.4 km	MPC · JPL
533189	2014 DA_{107}	—	December 31, 2008	Kitt Peak	Spacewatch	AGN	980 m	MPC · JPL
533190	2014 DE_{109}	—	April 5, 2003	Kitt Peak	Spacewatch	·	2.9 km	MPC · JPL
533191	2014 DQ_{110}	—	February 5, 2009	Mount Lemmon	Mount Lemmon Survey	H	500 m	MPC · JPL
533192	2014 DW_{112}	—	September 13, 2007	Catalina	CSS	H	440 m	MPC · JPL
533193	2014 DL_{115}	—	February 26, 2014	Haleakala	Pan-STARRS 1	·	2.6 km	MPC · JPL
533194	2014 DX_{115}	—	February 10, 2014	Haleakala	Pan-STARRS 1	·	2.4 km	MPC · JPL
533195	2014 DK_{126}	—	March 31, 2009	Mount Lemmon	Mount Lemmon Survey	·	1.9 km	MPC · JPL
533196	2014 DC_{128}	—	October 22, 2012	Haleakala	Pan-STARRS 1	·	1.6 km	MPC · JPL
533197	2014 DP_{129}	—	August 24, 2011	Haleakala	Pan-STARRS 1	·	1.6 km	MPC · JPL
533198	2014 DZ_{131}	—	February 22, 2014	Kitt Peak	Spacewatch	·	2.1 km	MPC · JPL
533199	2014 DF_{135}	—	February 8, 2008	Mount Lemmon	Mount Lemmon Survey	·	2.6 km	MPC · JPL
533200	2014 DW_{135}	—	March 31, 2009	Mount Lemmon	Mount Lemmon Survey	·	2.0 km	MPC · JPL

== 533201–533300 ==
back to top

Designation			Discovery			Properties		Ref
Permanent	Provisional	Named after	Date	Site	Discoverer(s)	Category	Diam.	Ref
533201	2014 DW_{138}	—	April 11, 2010	WISE	WISE	·	1.9 km	MPC · JPL
533202	2014 DW_{139}	—	February 28, 2014	Haleakala	Pan-STARRS 1	·	2.6 km	MPC · JPL
533203	2014 DK_{141}	—	February 27, 2009	Kitt Peak	Spacewatch	·	2.7 km	MPC · JPL
533204	2014 DT_{141}	—	February 2, 2005	Kitt Peak	Spacewatch	·	2.1 km	MPC · JPL
533205	2014 DD_{143}	—	February 28, 2014	Haleakala	Pan-STARRS 1	cubewano (cold)	194 km	MPC · JPL
533206	2014 DE_{143}	—	February 28, 2014	Haleakala	Pan-STARRS 1	cubewano (hot)	301 km	MPC · JPL
533207	2014 DJ_{143}	—	February 28, 2014	Haleakala	Pan-STARRS 1	other TNO	182 km	MPC · JPL
533208	2014 DQ_{143}	—	February 26, 2014	Haleakala	Pan-STARRS 1	SDO	146 km	MPC · JPL
533209	2014 DR_{143}	—	February 26, 2014	Haleakala	Pan-STARRS 1	plutino	332 km	MPC · JPL
533210	2014 DT_{143}	—	February 25, 2014	Haleakala	Pan-STARRS 1	SDO	154 km	MPC · JPL
533211	2014 DU_{143}	—	February 26, 2014	Haleakala	Pan-STARRS 1	res · 3:4	173 km	MPC · JPL
533212	2014 DZ_{143}	—	November 13, 2007	Mount Lemmon	Mount Lemmon Survey	H	470 m	MPC · JPL
533213	2014 DS_{144}	—	September 12, 2007	Catalina	CSS	H	470 m	MPC · JPL
533214	2014 DE_{145}	—	May 6, 2005	Catalina	CSS	·	1.7 km	MPC · JPL
533215	2014 DR_{145}	—	February 28, 2014	Haleakala	Pan-STARRS 1	·	2.6 km	MPC · JPL
533216	2014 DL_{146}	—	February 21, 2014	Haleakala	Pan-STARRS 1	·	2.7 km	MPC · JPL
533217	2014 DM_{146}	—	February 22, 2014	Kitt Peak	Spacewatch	GEF	930 m	MPC · JPL
533218	2014 DN_{146}	—	October 4, 2006	Mount Lemmon	Mount Lemmon Survey	·	2.9 km	MPC · JPL
533219	2014 DP_{146}	—	October 1, 2006	Kitt Peak	Spacewatch	·	2.5 km	MPC · JPL
533220	2014 DT_{146}	—	October 2, 2006	Mount Lemmon	Mount Lemmon Survey	·	1.8 km	MPC · JPL
533221	2014 DU_{146}	—	April 22, 2009	Kitt Peak	Spacewatch	EOS	1.9 km	MPC · JPL
533222	2014 DW_{146}	—	December 3, 2012	Mount Lemmon	Mount Lemmon Survey	·	2.3 km	MPC · JPL
533223	2014 DX_{146}	—	September 30, 2006	Mount Lemmon	Mount Lemmon Survey	·	2.6 km	MPC · JPL
533224	2014 DZ_{146}	—	September 15, 2006	Kitt Peak	Spacewatch	·	1.9 km	MPC · JPL
533225	2014 DB_{147}	—	April 15, 2010	Mount Lemmon	Mount Lemmon Survey	·	2.0 km	MPC · JPL
533226	2014 DE_{147}	—	November 18, 2007	Mount Lemmon	Mount Lemmon Survey	·	1.6 km	MPC · JPL
533227	2014 DG_{147}	—	October 12, 2007	Mount Lemmon	Mount Lemmon Survey	·	1.8 km	MPC · JPL
533228	2014 DR_{147}	—	December 18, 2007	Mount Lemmon	Mount Lemmon Survey	·	3.0 km	MPC · JPL
533229	2014 DS_{147}	—	January 9, 2013	Mount Lemmon	Mount Lemmon Survey	·	2.1 km	MPC · JPL
533230	2014 DT_{147}	—	October 29, 2006	Kitt Peak	Spacewatch	HYG	2.6 km	MPC · JPL
533231	2014 DU_{147}	—	September 4, 2011	Haleakala	Pan-STARRS 1	EOS	1.8 km	MPC · JPL
533232	2014 DX_{147}	—	February 18, 2008	Mount Lemmon	Mount Lemmon Survey	CYB	3.3 km	MPC · JPL
533233	2014 DZ_{147}	—	December 17, 2007	Mount Lemmon	Mount Lemmon Survey	·	2.2 km	MPC · JPL
533234	2014 DA_{148}	—	January 13, 2008	Mount Lemmon	Mount Lemmon Survey	·	2.3 km	MPC · JPL
533235	2014 DB_{148}	—	June 10, 2010	WISE	WISE	·	5.3 km	MPC · JPL
533236	2014 DE_{148}	—	April 4, 2008	Mount Lemmon	Mount Lemmon Survey	·	2.6 km	MPC · JPL
533237	2014 DN_{148}	—	September 4, 2011	Haleakala	Pan-STARRS 1	·	2.5 km	MPC · JPL
533238	2014 DR_{148}	—	March 21, 2009	Catalina	CSS	·	1.4 km	MPC · JPL
533239	2014 DY_{148}	—	February 27, 2009	Kitt Peak	Spacewatch	·	1.8 km	MPC · JPL
533240	2014 DZ_{148}	—	November 17, 2006	Mount Lemmon	Mount Lemmon Survey	·	2.2 km	MPC · JPL
533241	2014 DA_{149}	—	December 12, 2012	Mount Lemmon	Mount Lemmon Survey	TEL	1.3 km	MPC · JPL
533242	2014 DB_{149}	—	September 8, 2011	Kitt Peak	Spacewatch	KOR	1.4 km	MPC · JPL
533243	2014 DC_{149}	—	February 2, 2005	Kitt Peak	Spacewatch	·	1.7 km	MPC · JPL
533244	2014 DE_{149}	—	September 19, 2011	Haleakala	Pan-STARRS 1	EOS	1.8 km	MPC · JPL
533245	2014 DF_{149}	—	January 19, 2008	Mount Lemmon	Mount Lemmon Survey	EOS	1.6 km	MPC · JPL
533246	2014 DN_{149}	—	March 9, 2003	Kitt Peak	Spacewatch	·	2.5 km	MPC · JPL
533247	2014 DO_{149}	—	March 1, 2009	Kitt Peak	Spacewatch	KOR	1.4 km	MPC · JPL
533248	2014 DU_{150}	—	February 2, 2009	Mount Lemmon	Mount Lemmon Survey	·	2.6 km	MPC · JPL
533249	2014 DK_{151}	—	April 2, 2005	Mount Lemmon	Mount Lemmon Survey	DOR	1.9 km	MPC · JPL
533250	2014 DO_{153}	—	February 28, 2009	Kitt Peak	Spacewatch	·	1.7 km	MPC · JPL
533251	2014 DR_{153}	—	February 28, 2014	Haleakala	Pan-STARRS 1	·	1.5 km	MPC · JPL
533252	2014 DH_{154}	—	February 28, 2014	Haleakala	Pan-STARRS 1	EOS	1.5 km	MPC · JPL
533253	2014 DM_{154}	—	February 28, 2014	Haleakala	Pan-STARRS 1	·	1.7 km	MPC · JPL
533254	2014 DC_{155}	—	October 26, 2011	Haleakala	Pan-STARRS 1	·	2.8 km	MPC · JPL
533255	2014 DE_{155}	—	February 28, 2014	Haleakala	Pan-STARRS 1	·	2.2 km	MPC · JPL
533256	2014 DP_{155}	—	February 24, 2014	Haleakala	Pan-STARRS 1	VER	2.6 km	MPC · JPL
533257	2014 DQ_{155}	—	February 26, 2014	Mount Lemmon	Mount Lemmon Survey	·	2.2 km	MPC · JPL
533258	2014 DR_{155}	—	September 28, 2006	Kitt Peak	Spacewatch	·	2.6 km	MPC · JPL
533259	2014 DS_{155}	—	February 26, 2014	Haleakala	Pan-STARRS 1	·	2.6 km	MPC · JPL
533260	2014 DT_{155}	—	May 14, 2004	Kitt Peak	Spacewatch	·	2.1 km	MPC · JPL
533261	2014 DU_{155}	—	April 7, 2005	Kitt Peak	Spacewatch	·	2.0 km	MPC · JPL
533262	2014 DV_{155}	—	September 19, 2011	Mount Lemmon	Mount Lemmon Survey	EOS	2.0 km	MPC · JPL
533263	2014 DX_{155}	—	February 28, 2014	Haleakala	Pan-STARRS 1	·	1.7 km	MPC · JPL
533264	2014 DZ_{155}	—	October 4, 1999	Kitt Peak	Spacewatch	·	1.3 km	MPC · JPL
533265	2014 DB_{156}	—	November 3, 2007	Mount Lemmon	Mount Lemmon Survey	PAD	1.4 km	MPC · JPL
533266	2014 DC_{156}	—	October 15, 2007	Kitt Peak	Spacewatch	·	1.7 km	MPC · JPL
533267	2014 EB_{3}	—	March 1, 2009	Kitt Peak	Spacewatch	KOR	1.3 km	MPC · JPL
533268	2014 EW_{3}	—	September 13, 2007	Kitt Peak	Spacewatch	H	390 m	MPC · JPL
533269	2014 EL_{4}	—	October 7, 2004	Kitt Peak	Spacewatch	H	420 m	MPC · JPL
533270	2014 EA_{5}	—	February 20, 2014	Haleakala	Pan-STARRS 1	H	480 m	MPC · JPL
533271	2014 EV_{9}	—	February 25, 2014	Kitt Peak	Spacewatch	·	1.7 km	MPC · JPL
533272	2014 EY_{10}	—	February 15, 2001	Socorro	LINEAR	H	580 m	MPC · JPL
533273	2014 ES_{13}	—	March 5, 2014	Catalina	CSS	·	1.1 km	MPC · JPL
533274	2014 EX_{15}	—	March 15, 2004	Kitt Peak	Spacewatch	KOR	1.8 km	MPC · JPL
533275	2014 EL_{20}	—	January 1, 2009	Kitt Peak	Spacewatch	·	2.2 km	MPC · JPL
533276	2014 EW_{20}	—	February 26, 2014	Mount Lemmon	Mount Lemmon Survey	·	3.6 km	MPC · JPL
533277	2014 EF_{22}	—	March 17, 2009	Kitt Peak	Spacewatch	·	1.8 km	MPC · JPL
533278	2014 EZ_{22}	—	February 8, 2008	Mount Lemmon	Mount Lemmon Survey	THM	2.1 km	MPC · JPL
533279	2014 EF_{24}	—	March 9, 2014	Haleakala	Pan-STARRS 1	H	520 m	MPC · JPL
533280	2014 EU_{24}	—	February 21, 2014	Haleakala	Pan-STARRS 1	H	640 m	MPC · JPL
533281	2014 EP_{25}	—	October 8, 2012	Haleakala	Pan-STARRS 1	·	1.7 km	MPC · JPL
533282	2014 EB_{29}	—	December 6, 2012	Mount Lemmon	Mount Lemmon Survey	·	2.2 km	MPC · JPL
533283	2014 EK_{30}	—	January 10, 2008	Kitt Peak	Spacewatch	·	2.5 km	MPC · JPL
533284	2014 ES_{31}	—	October 17, 2010	Catalina	CSS	H	480 m	MPC · JPL
533285	2014 EB_{34}	—	November 7, 2007	Kitt Peak	Spacewatch	·	1.6 km	MPC · JPL
533286	2014 EE_{40}	—	April 30, 2009	Mount Lemmon	Mount Lemmon Survey	EOS	1.6 km	MPC · JPL
533287	2014 EY_{48}	—	May 29, 2012	Mount Lemmon	Mount Lemmon Survey	H	500 m	MPC · JPL
533288	2014 EK_{52}	—	November 18, 2006	Mount Lemmon	Mount Lemmon Survey	·	3.4 km	MPC · JPL
533289	2014 EL_{52}	—	April 18, 2009	Kitt Peak	Spacewatch	EOS	1.7 km	MPC · JPL
533290	2014 EA_{59}	—	January 20, 2008	Mount Lemmon	Mount Lemmon Survey	·	3.5 km	MPC · JPL
533291	2014 ET_{72}	—	February 3, 2009	Mount Lemmon	Mount Lemmon Survey	·	1.4 km	MPC · JPL
533292	2014 EF_{96}	—	October 12, 2007	Mount Lemmon	Mount Lemmon Survey	WIT	960 m	MPC · JPL
533293	2014 EE_{97}	—	March 3, 1997	Kitt Peak	Spacewatch	·	2.9 km	MPC · JPL
533294	2014 EL_{98}	—	August 4, 2011	Haleakala	Pan-STARRS 1	EOS	1.9 km	MPC · JPL
533295	2014 EX_{119}	—	September 24, 2005	Kitt Peak	Spacewatch	·	3.3 km	MPC · JPL
533296	2014 EZ_{119}	—	November 14, 2012	Mount Lemmon	Mount Lemmon Survey	·	1.8 km	MPC · JPL
533297	2014 ER_{133}	—	January 20, 2009	Mount Lemmon	Mount Lemmon Survey	·	1.8 km	MPC · JPL
533298	2014 EZ_{145}	—	July 12, 2016	Haleakala	Pan-STARRS 1	·	2.5 km	MPC · JPL
533299	2014 EE_{158}	—	September 9, 2011	Kitt Peak	Spacewatch	EOS	1.7 km	MPC · JPL
533300	2014 EQ_{188}	—	October 20, 2006	Mount Lemmon	Mount Lemmon Survey	·	2.9 km	MPC · JPL

== 533301–533400 ==
back to top

Designation			Discovery			Properties		Ref
Permanent	Provisional	Named after	Date	Site	Discoverer(s)	Category	Diam.	Ref
533301	2014 EE_{189}	—	September 22, 2001	Kitt Peak	Spacewatch	·	1.9 km	MPC · JPL
533302	2014 EU_{199}	—	September 24, 2006	Kitt Peak	Spacewatch	·	1.6 km	MPC · JPL
533303	2014 EC_{207}	—	October 3, 2006	Mount Lemmon	Mount Lemmon Survey	·	3.4 km	MPC · JPL
533304	2014 EC_{211}	—	January 11, 2008	Kitt Peak	Spacewatch	·	2.2 km	MPC · JPL
533305	2014 EG_{224}	—	March 19, 2009	Kitt Peak	Spacewatch	·	2.6 km	MPC · JPL
533306	2014 EJ_{247}	—	April 20, 2003	Anderson Mesa	LONEOS	·	3.9 km	MPC · JPL
533307	2014 ET_{248}	—	October 8, 2012	Mount Lemmon	Mount Lemmon Survey	·	2.1 km	MPC · JPL
533308	2014 EV_{248}	—	September 26, 2011	Haleakala	Pan-STARRS 1	·	2.4 km	MPC · JPL
533309	2014 EZ_{248}	—	September 11, 2005	Kitt Peak	Spacewatch	EOS	1.6 km	MPC · JPL
533310	2014 EF_{249}	—	March 8, 2014	Mount Lemmon	Mount Lemmon Survey	·	2.5 km	MPC · JPL
533311	2014 EK_{249}	—	March 28, 2009	Kitt Peak	Spacewatch	·	1.5 km	MPC · JPL
533312	2014 ET_{249}	—	April 19, 2009	Kitt Peak	Spacewatch	ELF	3.3 km	MPC · JPL
533313	2014 EV_{249}	—	November 17, 2006	Mount Lemmon	Mount Lemmon Survey	EOS	1.8 km	MPC · JPL
533314	2014 EW_{249}	—	January 17, 2008	Mount Lemmon	Mount Lemmon Survey	EOS	2.0 km	MPC · JPL
533315	2014 EC_{250}	—	March 13, 2014	Mount Lemmon	Mount Lemmon Survey	ARM	3.9 km	MPC · JPL
533316	2014 FL	—	March 20, 2014	Mount Lemmon	Mount Lemmon Survey	H	360 m	MPC · JPL
533317	2014 FQ	—	February 21, 2014	Haleakala	Pan-STARRS 1	H	440 m	MPC · JPL
533318	2014 FO_{1}	—	August 31, 2005	Kitt Peak	Spacewatch	VER	2.8 km	MPC · JPL
533319	2014 FD_{3}	—	February 28, 2014	Mount Lemmon	Mount Lemmon Survey	DOR	2.2 km	MPC · JPL
533320	2014 FE_{3}	—	September 23, 2011	Haleakala	Pan-STARRS 1	·	2.4 km	MPC · JPL
533321	2014 FV_{6}	—	November 24, 2000	Kitt Peak	Spacewatch	·	420 m	MPC · JPL
533322	2014 FL_{7}	—	March 20, 2014	Haleakala	Pan-STARRS 1	H	520 m	MPC · JPL
533323	2014 FN_{7}	—	February 27, 2014	Mount Lemmon	Mount Lemmon Survey	H	460 m	MPC · JPL
533324	2014 FA_{10}	—	February 26, 2008	Kitt Peak	Spacewatch	THM	1.9 km	MPC · JPL
533325	2014 FN_{10}	—	December 4, 2013	Haleakala	Pan-STARRS 1	·	2.0 km	MPC · JPL
533326	2014 FO_{20}	—	March 7, 2014	Mount Lemmon	Mount Lemmon Survey	H	400 m	MPC · JPL
533327	2014 FW_{22}	—	January 30, 2008	Mount Lemmon	Mount Lemmon Survey	VER	2.4 km	MPC · JPL
533328	2014 FG_{23}	—	April 18, 2009	Mount Lemmon	Mount Lemmon Survey	·	2.1 km	MPC · JPL
533329	2014 FC_{26}	—	May 4, 2009	Mount Lemmon	Mount Lemmon Survey	·	1.8 km	MPC · JPL
533330	2014 FW_{29}	—	August 10, 2011	Haleakala	Pan-STARRS 1	·	2.6 km	MPC · JPL
533331	2014 FE_{33}	—	March 24, 2014	Haleakala	Pan-STARRS 1	H	460 m	MPC · JPL
533332	2014 FV_{33}	—	May 26, 2006	Mount Lemmon	Mount Lemmon Survey	H	440 m	MPC · JPL
533333	2014 FC_{34}	—	February 4, 2006	Catalina	CSS	H	420 m	MPC · JPL
533334	2014 FJ_{35}	—	February 4, 2006	Catalina	CSS	H	640 m	MPC · JPL
533335	2014 FU_{35}	—	September 23, 2011	Haleakala	Pan-STARRS 1	·	2.9 km	MPC · JPL
533336	2014 FY_{37}	—	October 8, 2007	Catalina	CSS	H	520 m	MPC · JPL
533337	2014 FW_{40}	—	March 25, 2014	Kitt Peak	Spacewatch	·	650 m	MPC · JPL
533338	2014 FK_{43}	—	October 23, 2011	Haleakala	Pan-STARRS 1	·	2.9 km	MPC · JPL
533339	2014 FS_{43}	—	February 9, 2014	Mount Lemmon	Mount Lemmon Survey	H	650 m	MPC · JPL
533340	2014 FV_{47}	—	December 14, 2013	Haleakala	Pan-STARRS 1	·	2.5 km	MPC · JPL
533341	2014 FE_{57}	—	October 8, 2012	Haleakala	Pan-STARRS 1	·	2.1 km	MPC · JPL
533342	2014 FK_{68}	—	March 25, 2014	Kitt Peak	Spacewatch	H	510 m	MPC · JPL
533343	2014 FQ_{72}	—	October 8, 2007	Mount Lemmon	Mount Lemmon Survey	H	400 m	MPC · JPL
533344	2014 FR_{72}	—	March 22, 2014	Mount Lemmon	Mount Lemmon Survey	H	420 m	MPC · JPL
533345	2014 FT_{72}	—	March 22, 2014	Mount Lemmon	Mount Lemmon Survey	H	550 m	MPC · JPL
533346	2014 FC_{73}	—	January 14, 2008	Kitt Peak	Spacewatch	·	2.4 km	MPC · JPL
533347	2014 FS_{73}	—	October 22, 2006	Mount Lemmon	Mount Lemmon Survey	·	2.2 km	MPC · JPL
533348	2014 FT_{73}	—	October 4, 2006	Mount Lemmon	Mount Lemmon Survey	·	2.9 km	MPC · JPL
533349	2014 FU_{73}	—	September 22, 2011	Kitt Peak	Spacewatch	·	1.9 km	MPC · JPL
533350	2014 FZ_{73}	—	September 30, 2005	Mount Lemmon	Mount Lemmon Survey	·	3.0 km	MPC · JPL
533351	2014 FA_{74}	—	March 24, 2014	Haleakala	Pan-STARRS 1	EOS	1.7 km	MPC · JPL
533352	2014 FB_{74}	—	October 23, 2011	Haleakala	Pan-STARRS 1	·	2.6 km	MPC · JPL
533353	2014 FC_{74}	—	February 11, 2008	Mount Lemmon	Mount Lemmon Survey	·	2.2 km	MPC · JPL
533354	2014 FD_{74}	—	October 20, 2012	Mount Lemmon	Mount Lemmon Survey	·	2.3 km	MPC · JPL
533355	2014 FR_{74}	—	April 26, 2003	Kitt Peak	Spacewatch	·	4.1 km	MPC · JPL
533356	2014 FY_{74}	—	October 12, 2005	Kitt Peak	Spacewatch	·	2.8 km	MPC · JPL
533357	2014 FF_{75}	—	April 1, 2003	Apache Point	SDSS	·	2.4 km	MPC · JPL
533358	2014 FR_{75}	—	March 25, 2014	Kitt Peak	Spacewatch	·	2.2 km	MPC · JPL
533359	2014 FX_{75}	—	December 18, 2007	Mount Lemmon	Mount Lemmon Survey	·	1.6 km	MPC · JPL
533360	2014 FZ_{75}	—	May 15, 2009	Kitt Peak	Spacewatch	·	3.1 km	MPC · JPL
533361	2014 FA_{76}	—	September 4, 2011	Haleakala	Pan-STARRS 1	·	1.9 km	MPC · JPL
533362	2014 FE_{76}	—	March 29, 2014	Mount Lemmon	Mount Lemmon Survey	EOS	1.7 km	MPC · JPL
533363	2014 FF_{76}	—	May 13, 2005	Kitt Peak	Spacewatch	·	1.7 km	MPC · JPL
533364	2014 FJ_{76}	—	March 29, 2014	Haleakala	Pan-STARRS 1	·	2.8 km	MPC · JPL
533365	2014 FK_{76}	—	October 31, 2011	Mount Lemmon	Mount Lemmon Survey	EOS	1.5 km	MPC · JPL
533366	2014 FU_{76}	—	November 14, 2006	Kitt Peak	Spacewatch	·	2.6 km	MPC · JPL
533367	2014 FV_{76}	—	March 24, 2014	Haleakala	Pan-STARRS 1	·	2.3 km	MPC · JPL
533368	2014 FW_{76}	—	March 24, 2014	Haleakala	Pan-STARRS 1	·	1.8 km	MPC · JPL
533369	2014 GD	—	November 14, 1998	Kitt Peak	Spacewatch	·	1.8 km	MPC · JPL
533370	2014 GW_{1}	—	December 23, 2012	Haleakala	Pan-STARRS 1	·	1.9 km	MPC · JPL
533371	2014 GG_{11}	—	October 19, 2006	Kitt Peak	Spacewatch	EOS	1.6 km	MPC · JPL
533372	2014 GG_{17}	—	April 4, 2014	Kitt Peak	Spacewatch	APO · PHA	330 m	MPC · JPL
533373	2014 GW_{18}	—	May 16, 2009	Mount Lemmon	Mount Lemmon Survey	·	2.9 km	MPC · JPL
533374	2014 GH_{19}	—	February 18, 2008	Mount Lemmon	Mount Lemmon Survey	·	2.6 km	MPC · JPL
533375	2014 GA_{29}	—	October 10, 2007	Mount Lemmon	Mount Lemmon Survey	H	390 m	MPC · JPL
533376	2014 GC_{29}	—	February 12, 2008	Kitt Peak	Spacewatch	·	1.9 km	MPC · JPL
533377	2014 GW_{30}	—	January 16, 2013	Mount Lemmon	Mount Lemmon Survey	·	2.2 km	MPC · JPL
533378	2014 GY_{30}	—	January 12, 2008	Kitt Peak	Spacewatch	·	1.7 km	MPC · JPL
533379	2014 GP_{32}	—	February 28, 2014	Haleakala	Pan-STARRS 1	H	400 m	MPC · JPL
533380	2014 GR_{33}	—	October 21, 2011	Kitt Peak	Spacewatch	·	3.1 km	MPC · JPL
533381	2014 GX_{33}	—	April 5, 2014	Haleakala	Pan-STARRS 1	·	1.5 km	MPC · JPL
533382	2014 GF_{34}	—	March 24, 2009	Mount Lemmon	Mount Lemmon Survey	H	480 m	MPC · JPL
533383	2014 GP_{34}	—	October 27, 2005	Catalina	CSS	H	420 m	MPC · JPL
533384	2014 GB_{35}	—	March 2, 2008	XuYi	PMO NEO Survey Program	T_{j} (2.97)	3.2 km	MPC · JPL
533385	2014 GT_{35}	—	March 25, 2014	Haleakala	Pan-STARRS 1	H	530 m	MPC · JPL
533386	2014 GG_{37}	—	March 24, 2014	Haleakala	Pan-STARRS 1	·	2.3 km	MPC · JPL
533387	2014 GX_{39}	—	September 15, 2007	Mount Lemmon	Mount Lemmon Survey	H	500 m	MPC · JPL
533388	2014 GW_{44}	—	August 13, 2012	Haleakala	Pan-STARRS 1	H	430 m	MPC · JPL
533389	2014 GW_{45}	—	April 2, 2009	Mount Lemmon	Mount Lemmon Survey	·	1.4 km	MPC · JPL
533390	2014 GM_{46}	—	March 22, 2014	Mount Lemmon	Mount Lemmon Survey	·	2.5 km	MPC · JPL
533391	2014 GO_{47}	—	May 19, 2006	Mount Lemmon	Mount Lemmon Survey	H	480 m	MPC · JPL
533392	2014 GW_{47}	—	December 23, 2012	Haleakala	Pan-STARRS 1	·	1.8 km	MPC · JPL
533393	2014 GX_{52}	—	August 25, 2012	Haleakala	Pan-STARRS 1	H	440 m	MPC · JPL
533394	2014 GY_{52}	—	April 10, 2014	Haleakala	Pan-STARRS 1	H	390 m	MPC · JPL
533395	2014 GF_{53}	—	April 10, 2014	Haleakala	Pan-STARRS 1	H	460 m	MPC · JPL
533396	2014 GQ_{53}	—	April 8, 2014	Haleakala	Pan-STARRS 1	centaur	70 km	MPC · JPL
533397	2014 GZ_{53}	—	April 5, 2014	Haleakala	Pan-STARRS 1	cubewano (hot)	255 km	MPC · JPL
533398	2014 GA_{54}	—	April 5, 2014	Haleakala	Pan-STARRS 1	res · 5:8	134 km	MPC · JPL
533399	2014 GQ_{54}	—	October 16, 2012	Mount Lemmon	Mount Lemmon Survey	H	420 m	MPC · JPL
533400	2014 GZ_{54}	—	April 10, 2014	Haleakala	Pan-STARRS 1	H	400 m	MPC · JPL

== 533401–533500 ==
back to top

Designation			Discovery			Properties		Ref
Permanent	Provisional	Named after	Date	Site	Discoverer(s)	Category	Diam.	Ref
533401	2014 GD_{55}	—	November 14, 2006	Kitt Peak	Spacewatch	LIX	2.9 km	MPC · JPL
533402	2014 GY_{55}	—	April 4, 2008	Catalina	CSS	·	2.9 km	MPC · JPL
533403	2014 GF_{56}	—	April 5, 2014	Haleakala	Pan-STARRS 1	·	2.0 km	MPC · JPL
533404	2014 GP_{56}	—	March 10, 2008	Kitt Peak	Spacewatch	·	2.4 km	MPC · JPL
533405	2014 GQ_{56}	—	April 10, 2014	Haleakala	Pan-STARRS 1	·	2.8 km	MPC · JPL
533406	2014 GQ_{57}	—	February 26, 2008	Mount Lemmon	Mount Lemmon Survey	THM	1.8 km	MPC · JPL
533407	2014 GS_{57}	—	March 2, 2008	Mount Lemmon	Mount Lemmon Survey	·	2.3 km	MPC · JPL
533408	2014 GV_{57}	—	March 5, 2013	Kitt Peak	Spacewatch	·	3.0 km	MPC · JPL
533409	2014 GW_{57}	—	December 19, 2007	Mount Lemmon	Mount Lemmon Survey	EOS	1.7 km	MPC · JPL
533410	2014 GC_{58}	—	December 9, 2006	Kitt Peak	Spacewatch	CYB	2.4 km	MPC · JPL
533411	2014 GR_{58}	—	October 17, 2010	Mount Lemmon	Mount Lemmon Survey	·	2.5 km	MPC · JPL
533412	2014 GB_{59}	—	April 18, 2009	Kitt Peak	Spacewatch	EOS	2.0 km	MPC · JPL
533413	2014 GC_{59}	—	October 29, 2011	Kitt Peak	Spacewatch	·	1.9 km	MPC · JPL
533414	2014 GF_{59}	—	April 5, 2014	Haleakala	Pan-STARRS 1	EOS	1.3 km	MPC · JPL
533415	2014 GN_{59}	—	September 4, 2011	Haleakala	Pan-STARRS 1	·	3.5 km	MPC · JPL
533416	2014 GP_{59}	—	March 21, 2004	Kitt Peak	Spacewatch	·	2.3 km	MPC · JPL
533417	2014 GT_{59}	—	October 22, 2011	Mount Lemmon	Mount Lemmon Survey	·	2.2 km	MPC · JPL
533418	2014 GV_{59}	—	April 3, 2008	Catalina	CSS	T_{j} (2.99) · EUP	3.1 km	MPC · JPL
533419	2014 GF_{60}	—	October 24, 2011	Haleakala	Pan-STARRS 1	EOS	1.6 km	MPC · JPL
533420	2014 GL_{60}	—	October 1, 2010	Mount Lemmon	Mount Lemmon Survey	·	2.4 km	MPC · JPL
533421	2014 GH_{61}	—	April 5, 2014	Haleakala	Pan-STARRS 1	·	2.7 km	MPC · JPL
533422	2014 GM_{61}	—	April 5, 2014	Haleakala	Pan-STARRS 1	·	2.2 km	MPC · JPL
533423	2014 GN_{61}	—	January 17, 2013	Haleakala	Pan-STARRS 1	·	2.3 km	MPC · JPL
533424	2014 GQ_{61}	—	April 30, 2003	Kitt Peak	Spacewatch	·	2.7 km	MPC · JPL
533425	2014 GM_{62}	—	February 9, 2008	Kitt Peak	Spacewatch	·	1.7 km	MPC · JPL
533426	2014 GX_{62}	—	March 11, 2008	Kitt Peak	Spacewatch	·	2.3 km	MPC · JPL
533427	2014 GY_{62}	—	April 21, 2009	Mount Lemmon	Mount Lemmon Survey	·	1.3 km	MPC · JPL
533428	2014 GC_{63}	—	October 20, 2011	Mount Lemmon	Mount Lemmon Survey	·	1.9 km	MPC · JPL
533429	2014 GE_{63}	—	October 24, 2011	Haleakala	Pan-STARRS 1	·	1.9 km	MPC · JPL
533430	2014 GG_{63}	—	December 16, 2007	Kitt Peak	Spacewatch	·	1.5 km	MPC · JPL
533431	2014 GR_{63}	—	January 11, 2008	Kitt Peak	Spacewatch	·	1.4 km	MPC · JPL
533432	2014 GZ_{63}	—	April 5, 2014	Haleakala	Pan-STARRS 1	URS	2.6 km	MPC · JPL
533433	2014 GA_{64}	—	January 19, 2013	Mount Lemmon	Mount Lemmon Survey	THM	1.9 km	MPC · JPL
533434	2014 GK_{64}	—	June 7, 2010	WISE	WISE	·	2.5 km	MPC · JPL
533435	2014 GW_{64}	—	January 18, 2013	Haleakala	Pan-STARRS 1	·	2.8 km	MPC · JPL
533436	2014 GZ_{64}	—	April 5, 2014	Haleakala	Pan-STARRS 1	·	780 m	MPC · JPL
533437	2014 GB_{65}	—	October 13, 2006	Kitt Peak	Spacewatch	EOS	1.6 km	MPC · JPL
533438	2014 GC_{65}	—	September 24, 1995	Kitt Peak	Spacewatch	·	2.7 km	MPC · JPL
533439	2014 HO_{1}	—	April 5, 2014	Haleakala	Pan-STARRS 1	·	2.6 km	MPC · JPL
533440	2014 HQ_{2}	—	March 27, 2009	Mount Lemmon	Mount Lemmon Survey	H	480 m	MPC · JPL
533441	2014 HX_{4}	—	February 10, 2014	Haleakala	Pan-STARRS 1	H	450 m	MPC · JPL
533442	2014 HK_{6}	—	February 12, 2008	Mount Lemmon	Mount Lemmon Survey	·	2.2 km	MPC · JPL
533443	2014 HT_{6}	—	April 11, 2003	Kitt Peak	Spacewatch	H	390 m	MPC · JPL
533444	2014 HJ_{7}	—	March 21, 2014	Kitt Peak	Spacewatch	·	1.8 km	MPC · JPL
533445	2014 HS_{7}	—	October 24, 2011	Haleakala	Pan-STARRS 1	·	2.6 km	MPC · JPL
533446	2014 HX_{7}	—	March 26, 2008	Mount Lemmon	Mount Lemmon Survey	·	2.4 km	MPC · JPL
533447	2014 HK_{12}	—	February 2, 2008	Kitt Peak	Spacewatch	·	2.2 km	MPC · JPL
533448	2014 HM_{14}	—	November 13, 2006	Catalina	CSS	·	3.2 km	MPC · JPL
533449	2014 HO_{14}	—	May 11, 2010	WISE	WISE	·	3.3 km	MPC · JPL
533450	2014 HP_{15}	—	April 5, 2014	Haleakala	Pan-STARRS 1	·	1.4 km	MPC · JPL
533451	2014 HE_{16}	—	October 24, 2011	Haleakala	Pan-STARRS 1	·	1.6 km	MPC · JPL
533452	2014 HG_{22}	—	March 23, 2014	Kitt Peak	Spacewatch	·	2.1 km	MPC · JPL
533453	2014 HS_{24}	—	January 14, 2008	Kitt Peak	Spacewatch	·	1.6 km	MPC · JPL
533454	2014 HY_{24}	—	January 16, 2013	Haleakala	Pan-STARRS 1	·	2.5 km	MPC · JPL
533455	2014 HZ_{24}	—	February 28, 2014	Haleakala	Pan-STARRS 1	·	3.0 km	MPC · JPL
533456	2014 HB_{25}	—	April 8, 2014	Haleakala	Pan-STARRS 1	·	1.7 km	MPC · JPL
533457	2014 HK_{25}	—	March 15, 2008	Mount Lemmon	Mount Lemmon Survey	·	2.6 km	MPC · JPL
533458	2014 HK_{27}	—	April 4, 2014	Haleakala	Pan-STARRS 1	EOS	1.5 km	MPC · JPL
533459	2014 HM_{28}	—	October 1, 2010	Mount Lemmon	Mount Lemmon Survey	·	1.6 km	MPC · JPL
533460	2014 HH_{29}	—	March 25, 2014	Kitt Peak	Spacewatch	HNS	980 m	MPC · JPL
533461	2014 HX_{29}	—	December 1, 2005	Mount Lemmon	Mount Lemmon Survey	·	2.3 km	MPC · JPL
533462	2014 HV_{35}	—	January 16, 2013	Mount Lemmon	Mount Lemmon Survey	·	2.5 km	MPC · JPL
533463	2014 HB_{37}	—	October 1, 2005	Kitt Peak	Spacewatch	·	2.3 km	MPC · JPL
533464	2014 HR_{43}	—	March 11, 2008	Mount Lemmon	Mount Lemmon Survey	TIR	1.9 km	MPC · JPL
533465	2014 HP_{44}	—	November 18, 2007	Kitt Peak	Spacewatch	·	1.1 km	MPC · JPL
533466	2014 HR_{45}	—	December 30, 2007	Kitt Peak	Spacewatch	·	2.1 km	MPC · JPL
533467	2014 HQ_{46}	—	October 9, 2012	Catalina	CSS	H	590 m	MPC · JPL
533468	2014 HM_{47}	—	March 25, 2014	Kitt Peak	Spacewatch	EOS	2.0 km	MPC · JPL
533469	2014 HU_{51}	—	May 20, 2010	WISE	WISE	·	2.3 km	MPC · JPL
533470	2014 HD_{68}	—	October 23, 2011	Mount Lemmon	Mount Lemmon Survey	·	2.2 km	MPC · JPL
533471	2014 HW_{72}	—	October 1, 2005	Mount Lemmon	Mount Lemmon Survey	VER	2.2 km	MPC · JPL
533472	2014 HU_{74}	—	December 18, 2007	Mount Lemmon	Mount Lemmon Survey	·	1.7 km	MPC · JPL
533473	2014 HZ_{90}	—	March 25, 2014	Kitt Peak	Spacewatch	·	2.5 km	MPC · JPL
533474	2014 HT_{96}	—	November 2, 2011	Kitt Peak	Spacewatch	·	2.5 km	MPC · JPL
533475	2014 HM_{111}	—	December 18, 2001	Socorro	LINEAR	·	2.2 km	MPC · JPL
533476	2014 HK_{122}	—	February 24, 2008	Mount Lemmon	Mount Lemmon Survey	·	1.7 km	MPC · JPL
533477	2014 HW_{123}	—	April 25, 2014	Mount Lemmon	Mount Lemmon Survey	H	460 m	MPC · JPL
533478	2014 HY_{132}	—	November 15, 2007	Catalina	CSS	H	470 m	MPC · JPL
533479	2014 HE_{135}	—	January 10, 2008	Kitt Peak	Spacewatch	KOR	1.1 km	MPC · JPL
533480	2014 HA_{139}	—	March 25, 2014	Kitt Peak	Spacewatch	·	2.5 km	MPC · JPL
533481	2014 HM_{142}	—	June 5, 2011	Mount Lemmon	Mount Lemmon Survey	BAP	690 m	MPC · JPL
533482	2014 HR_{153}	—	February 9, 2008	Mount Lemmon	Mount Lemmon Survey	·	1.9 km	MPC · JPL
533483	2014 HQ_{155}	—	March 23, 2014	Kitt Peak	Spacewatch	·	2.8 km	MPC · JPL
533484	2014 HD_{156}	—	March 11, 2008	Mount Lemmon	Mount Lemmon Survey	·	2.6 km	MPC · JPL
533485	2014 HU_{156}	—	September 14, 2010	Mount Lemmon	Mount Lemmon Survey	·	2.5 km	MPC · JPL
533486	2014 HZ_{156}	—	June 12, 2010	WISE	WISE	·	2.5 km	MPC · JPL
533487	2014 HT_{157}	—	March 1, 2008	Kitt Peak	Spacewatch	·	2.5 km	MPC · JPL
533488	2014 HE_{163}	—	September 4, 2011	Haleakala	Pan-STARRS 1	·	2.3 km	MPC · JPL
533489	2014 HN_{163}	—	March 25, 2014	Mount Lemmon	Mount Lemmon Survey	EOS	2.1 km	MPC · JPL
533490	2014 HH_{168}	—	April 25, 2014	Mount Lemmon	Mount Lemmon Survey	·	2.6 km	MPC · JPL
533491	2014 HJ_{168}	—	October 29, 2005	Mount Lemmon	Mount Lemmon Survey	·	3.1 km	MPC · JPL
533492	2014 HR_{168}	—	September 16, 2010	Kitt Peak	Spacewatch	·	1.6 km	MPC · JPL
533493	2014 HF_{173}	—	April 29, 2014	Haleakala	Pan-STARRS 1	·	2.1 km	MPC · JPL
533494	2014 HH_{175}	—	October 31, 2005	Kitt Peak	Spacewatch	·	460 m	MPC · JPL
533495	2014 HU_{177}	—	September 7, 2008	Catalina	CSS	·	660 m	MPC · JPL
533496	2014 HK_{178}	—	February 28, 2014	Haleakala	Pan-STARRS 1	H	530 m	MPC · JPL
533497	2014 HD_{179}	—	April 2, 2006	Catalina	CSS	H	530 m	MPC · JPL
533498	2014 HT_{179}	—	February 13, 2013	Haleakala	Pan-STARRS 1	·	1.7 km	MPC · JPL
533499	2014 HD_{182}	—	December 22, 2012	Haleakala	Pan-STARRS 1	EOS	1.7 km	MPC · JPL
533500	2014 HY_{183}	—	March 6, 2008	Mount Lemmon	Mount Lemmon Survey	·	2.5 km	MPC · JPL

== 533501–533600 ==
back to top

Designation			Discovery			Properties		Ref
Permanent	Provisional	Named after	Date	Site	Discoverer(s)	Category	Diam.	Ref
533501	2014 HM_{185}	—	April 9, 2003	Socorro	LINEAR	H	590 m	MPC · JPL
533502	2014 HN_{187}	—	June 12, 2009	Kitt Peak	Spacewatch	H	450 m	MPC · JPL
533503	2014 HE_{190}	—	October 29, 2005	Kitt Peak	Spacewatch	·	1.7 km	MPC · JPL
533504	2014 HF_{190}	—	October 30, 2008	Kitt Peak	Spacewatch	(2076)	620 m	MPC · JPL
533505	2014 HQ_{190}	—	May 1, 2009	Mount Lemmon	Mount Lemmon Survey	H	420 m	MPC · JPL
533506	2014 HU_{199}	—	April 30, 2014	Haleakala	Pan-STARRS 1	cubewano (hot)	242 km	MPC · JPL
533507	2014 HV_{199}	—	April 30, 2014	Haleakala	Pan-STARRS 1	other TNO	191 km	MPC · JPL
533508	2014 HC_{200}	—	April 29, 2014	Haleakala	Pan-STARRS 1	SDO	200 km	MPC · JPL
533509	2014 HL_{200}	—	November 21, 2007	Mount Lemmon	Mount Lemmon Survey	H	500 m	MPC · JPL
533510	2014 HO_{200}	—	April 8, 2014	Haleakala	Pan-STARRS 1	H	500 m	MPC · JPL
533511	2014 HF_{202}	—	April 30, 2014	Haleakala	Pan-STARRS 1	·	2.6 km	MPC · JPL
533512	2014 HJ_{203}	—	February 9, 2008	Mount Lemmon	Mount Lemmon Survey	·	1.4 km	MPC · JPL
533513	2014 HM_{203}	—	December 21, 2006	Mount Lemmon	Mount Lemmon Survey	·	2.5 km	MPC · JPL
533514	2014 HN_{203}	—	January 20, 2008	Kitt Peak	Spacewatch	·	1.8 km	MPC · JPL
533515	2014 HY_{203}	—	July 14, 2010	WISE	WISE	·	3.0 km	MPC · JPL
533516	2014 HH_{204}	—	January 13, 2002	Kitt Peak	Spacewatch	·	1.8 km	MPC · JPL
533517	2014 HS_{204}	—	January 6, 2013	Kitt Peak	Spacewatch	T_{j} (2.99) · EUP	2.5 km	MPC · JPL
533518	2014 HH_{205}	—	April 24, 2014	Haleakala	Pan-STARRS 1	·	1.5 km	MPC · JPL
533519	2014 HE_{207}	—	March 8, 2008	Kitt Peak	Spacewatch	·	2.5 km	MPC · JPL
533520	2014 HM_{207}	—	October 18, 2011	Kitt Peak	Spacewatch	·	2.3 km	MPC · JPL
533521	2014 HE_{211}	—	December 24, 2006	Kitt Peak	Spacewatch	VER	2.6 km	MPC · JPL
533522	2014 HF_{211}	—	April 30, 2014	Haleakala	Pan-STARRS 1	·	2.2 km	MPC · JPL
533523	2014 JO	—	December 23, 2012	Haleakala	Pan-STARRS 1	CYB	3.0 km	MPC · JPL
533524	2014 JH_{5}	—	October 20, 2011	Mount Lemmon	Mount Lemmon Survey	LUT	2.9 km	MPC · JPL
533525	2014 JN_{14}	—	May 3, 2014	Mount Lemmon	Mount Lemmon Survey	·	1.6 km	MPC · JPL
533526	2014 JZ_{16}	—	December 12, 2006	Kitt Peak	Spacewatch	·	2.5 km	MPC · JPL
533527	2014 JK_{19}	—	October 23, 2011	Mount Lemmon	Mount Lemmon Survey	·	2.1 km	MPC · JPL
533528	2014 JH_{23}	—	September 30, 2009	Mount Lemmon	Mount Lemmon Survey	H	560 m	MPC · JPL
533529	2014 JA_{25}	—	April 10, 2014	Haleakala	Pan-STARRS 1	H	630 m	MPC · JPL
533530	2014 JQ_{26}	—	April 8, 2014	Haleakala	Pan-STARRS 1	·	2.7 km	MPC · JPL
533531	2014 JM_{28}	—	April 30, 2014	Haleakala	Pan-STARRS 1	·	3.2 km	MPC · JPL
533532	2014 JB_{30}	—	March 10, 2008	Mount Lemmon	Mount Lemmon Survey	T_{j} (2.96)	3.2 km	MPC · JPL
533533	2014 JU_{32}	—	April 3, 2008	Mount Lemmon	Mount Lemmon Survey	·	2.4 km	MPC · JPL
533534	2014 JW_{37}	—	May 4, 2014	Haleakala	Pan-STARRS 1	·	700 m	MPC · JPL
533535	2014 JO_{42}	—	September 24, 2011	Haleakala	Pan-STARRS 1	·	750 m	MPC · JPL
533536	2014 JQ_{49}	—	May 4, 2014	Kitt Peak	Spacewatch	EOS	1.4 km	MPC · JPL
533537	2014 JB_{50}	—	March 27, 2008	Mount Lemmon	Mount Lemmon Survey	·	2.0 km	MPC · JPL
533538	2014 JH_{52}	—	October 27, 2005	Kitt Peak	Spacewatch	·	3.0 km	MPC · JPL
533539	2014 JK_{53}	—	April 30, 2014	Haleakala	Pan-STARRS 1	TIR	2.2 km	MPC · JPL
533540	2014 JO_{53}	—	April 30, 2014	Haleakala	Pan-STARRS 1	THM	2.0 km	MPC · JPL
533541	2014 JU_{54}	—	May 7, 2014	Mount Lemmon	Mount Lemmon Survey	AMO	360 m	MPC · JPL
533542	2014 JA_{55}	—	April 17, 2009	Kitt Peak	Spacewatch	H	360 m	MPC · JPL
533543	2014 JA_{56}	—	February 5, 2011	Mount Lemmon	Mount Lemmon Survey	H	530 m	MPC · JPL
533544	2014 JK_{57}	—	May 9, 2014	Haleakala	Pan-STARRS 1	·	760 m	MPC · JPL
533545	2014 JD_{58}	—	April 25, 2003	Kitt Peak	Spacewatch	·	2.7 km	MPC · JPL
533546	2014 JF_{59}	—	January 16, 2008	Kitt Peak	Spacewatch	·	1.6 km	MPC · JPL
533547	2014 JO_{59}	—	May 28, 2009	Mount Lemmon	Mount Lemmon Survey	EOS	1.4 km	MPC · JPL
533548	2014 JO_{60}	—	September 2, 2010	Mount Lemmon	Mount Lemmon Survey	·	1.7 km	MPC · JPL
533549	2014 JA_{61}	—	July 17, 2010	WISE	WISE	·	4.4 km	MPC · JPL
533550	2014 JA_{62}	—	March 31, 2008	Mount Lemmon	Mount Lemmon Survey	·	2.3 km	MPC · JPL
533551	2014 JF_{63}	—	May 4, 2014	Haleakala	Pan-STARRS 1	T_{j} (2.98)	3.0 km	MPC · JPL
533552	2014 JO_{63}	—	April 6, 2014	Mount Lemmon	Mount Lemmon Survey	·	2.2 km	MPC · JPL
533553	2014 JQ_{68}	—	October 21, 2011	Mount Lemmon	Mount Lemmon Survey	·	3.3 km	MPC · JPL
533554	2014 JO_{70}	—	April 30, 2014	Haleakala	Pan-STARRS 1	·	870 m	MPC · JPL
533555	2014 JA_{75}	—	March 1, 2008	Kitt Peak	Spacewatch	·	2.1 km	MPC · JPL
533556	2014 JU_{75}	—	April 30, 2014	Haleakala	Pan-STARRS 1	·	2.4 km	MPC · JPL
533557	2014 JJ_{78}	—	April 10, 2014	Haleakala	Pan-STARRS 1	H	490 m	MPC · JPL
533558	2014 JW_{78}	—	November 9, 2007	Catalina	CSS	H	590 m	MPC · JPL
533559	2014 JG_{80}	—	May 9, 2014	Haleakala	Pan-STARRS 1	centaur	146 km	MPC · JPL
533560	2014 JM_{80}	—	May 7, 2014	Haleakala	Pan-STARRS 1	SDO	262 km	MPC · JPL
533561	2014 JN_{80}	—	May 7, 2014	Haleakala	Pan-STARRS 1	cubewano (hot)	224 km	MPC · JPL
533562	2014 JQ_{80}	—	May 8, 2014	Haleakala	Pan-STARRS 1	plutino	165 km	MPC · JPL
533563	2014 JW_{80}	—	May 8, 2014	Haleakala	Pan-STARRS 1	SDO	260 km	MPC · JPL
533564	2014 JA_{81}	—	October 14, 2007	Mount Lemmon	Mount Lemmon Survey	H	370 m	MPC · JPL
533565	2014 JL_{81}	—	April 11, 2003	Kitt Peak	Spacewatch	H	470 m	MPC · JPL
533566	2014 JF_{83}	—	April 25, 2003	Campo Imperatore	CINEOS	·	1.8 km	MPC · JPL
533567	2014 JA_{84}	—	September 29, 2005	Mount Lemmon	Mount Lemmon Survey	·	2.6 km	MPC · JPL
533568	2014 JR_{84}	—	February 8, 2008	Kitt Peak	Spacewatch	·	1.7 km	MPC · JPL
533569	2014 JU_{85}	—	May 3, 2008	Mount Lemmon	Mount Lemmon Survey	LUT	5.7 km	MPC · JPL
533570	2014 JC_{86}	—	October 20, 1998	Kitt Peak	Spacewatch	·	760 m	MPC · JPL
533571	2014 JO_{86}	—	March 28, 2008	Kitt Peak	Spacewatch	VER	2.3 km	MPC · JPL
533572	2014 JQ_{86}	—	May 6, 2014	Haleakala	Pan-STARRS 1	·	1.9 km	MPC · JPL
533573	2014 JC_{87}	—	May 5, 2003	Kitt Peak	Spacewatch	(8737)	3.2 km	MPC · JPL
533574	2014 JE_{87}	—	April 8, 2003	Kitt Peak	Spacewatch	·	2.2 km	MPC · JPL
533575	2014 JF_{87}	—	May 6, 2014	Haleakala	Pan-STARRS 1	EOS	1.7 km	MPC · JPL
533576	2014 JG_{87}	—	May 6, 2014	Haleakala	Pan-STARRS 1	EOS	1.4 km	MPC · JPL
533577	2014 JH_{87}	—	February 15, 2013	Haleakala	Pan-STARRS 1	EOS	1.4 km	MPC · JPL
533578	2014 JJ_{87}	—	May 10, 2014	Kitt Peak	Spacewatch	LIX	2.8 km	MPC · JPL
533579	2014 JH_{88}	—	September 11, 2004	Kitt Peak	Spacewatch	THM	2.0 km	MPC · JPL
533580	2014 JM_{88}	—	January 17, 2013	Haleakala	Pan-STARRS 1	·	1.5 km	MPC · JPL
533581	2014 JG_{89}	—	October 22, 2011	Kitt Peak	Spacewatch	·	2.5 km	MPC · JPL
533582	2014 JS_{89}	—	May 6, 2014	Haleakala	Pan-STARRS 1	·	2.2 km	MPC · JPL
533583	2014 JA_{90}	—	March 24, 2013	Mount Lemmon	Mount Lemmon Survey	·	2.7 km	MPC · JPL
533584	2014 JA_{91}	—	June 1, 2003	Kitt Peak	Spacewatch	·	2.3 km	MPC · JPL
533585	2014 KX_{1}	—	May 27, 2009	Mount Lemmon	Mount Lemmon Survey	TIR	2.7 km	MPC · JPL
533586	2014 KG_{4}	—	October 24, 2012	Haleakala	Pan-STARRS 1	H	470 m	MPC · JPL
533587	2014 KS_{4}	—	March 31, 2014	Kitt Peak	Spacewatch	·	2.6 km	MPC · JPL
533588	2014 KF_{8}	—	October 6, 2012	Haleakala	Pan-STARRS 1	H	420 m	MPC · JPL
533589	2014 KU_{9}	—	October 20, 2008	Mount Lemmon	Mount Lemmon Survey	·	480 m	MPC · JPL
533590	2014 KV_{13}	—	May 21, 2014	Haleakala	Pan-STARRS 1	·	730 m	MPC · JPL
533591	2014 KQ_{17}	—	January 4, 2013	Kitt Peak	Spacewatch	·	2.4 km	MPC · JPL
533592	2014 KP_{21}	—	September 13, 2007	Catalina	CSS	H	420 m	MPC · JPL
533593	2014 KR_{21}	—	December 29, 2008	Kitt Peak	Spacewatch	·	590 m	MPC · JPL
533594	2014 KS_{21}	—	January 18, 2013	Mount Lemmon	Mount Lemmon Survey	·	600 m	MPC · JPL
533595	2014 KY_{21}	—	April 10, 2014	Haleakala	Pan-STARRS 1	H	500 m	MPC · JPL
533596	2014 KJ_{22}	—	April 8, 2014	Haleakala	Pan-STARRS 1	H	450 m	MPC · JPL
533597	2014 KK_{22}	—	April 10, 2014	Haleakala	Pan-STARRS 1	H	510 m	MPC · JPL
533598	2014 KO_{22}	—	April 9, 2014	Haleakala	Pan-STARRS 1	TIR	2.6 km	MPC · JPL
533599	2014 KE_{24}	—	December 22, 2012	Haleakala	Pan-STARRS 1	·	3.1 km	MPC · JPL
533600	2014 KS_{27}	—	October 2, 2006	Mount Lemmon	Mount Lemmon Survey	·	2.9 km	MPC · JPL

== 533601–533700 ==
back to top

Designation			Discovery			Properties		Ref
Permanent	Provisional	Named after	Date	Site	Discoverer(s)	Category	Diam.	Ref
533601	2014 KX_{28}	—	December 25, 2005	Mount Lemmon	Mount Lemmon Survey	·	780 m	MPC · JPL
533602	2014 KN_{29}	—	April 30, 2014	Haleakala	Pan-STARRS 1	·	2.3 km	MPC · JPL
533603	2014 KY_{31}	—	February 9, 2008	Kitt Peak	Spacewatch	·	1.5 km	MPC · JPL
533604	2014 KN_{32}	—	April 26, 2008	Mount Lemmon	Mount Lemmon Survey	·	2.8 km	MPC · JPL
533605	2014 KU_{32}	—	February 14, 2013	Haleakala	Pan-STARRS 1	·	2.4 km	MPC · JPL
533606	2014 KC_{33}	—	October 1, 2008	Mount Lemmon	Mount Lemmon Survey	·	520 m	MPC · JPL
533607	2014 KO_{34}	—	April 8, 2014	Mount Lemmon	Mount Lemmon Survey	·	2.5 km	MPC · JPL
533608	2014 KW_{35}	—	February 21, 2002	Kitt Peak	Spacewatch	·	3.1 km	MPC · JPL
533609	2014 KS_{38}	—	October 28, 2011	Mount Lemmon	Mount Lemmon Survey	·	920 m	MPC · JPL
533610	2014 KY_{39}	—	September 21, 2008	Catalina	CSS	·	720 m	MPC · JPL
533611	2014 KR_{40}	—	April 28, 2014	Haleakala	Pan-STARRS 1	H	440 m	MPC · JPL
533612	2014 KH_{41}	—	February 3, 2013	Haleakala	Pan-STARRS 1	·	2.6 km	MPC · JPL
533613	2014 KD_{44}	—	January 10, 2013	Kitt Peak	Spacewatch	EUP	3.4 km	MPC · JPL
533614	2014 KS_{44}	—	September 4, 2008	Kitt Peak	Spacewatch	·	580 m	MPC · JPL
533615	2014 KU_{45}	—	April 30, 2014	Haleakala	Pan-STARRS 1	H	430 m	MPC · JPL
533616	2014 KX_{45}	—	April 8, 2014	Haleakala	Pan-STARRS 1	H	610 m	MPC · JPL
533617	2014 KX_{52}	—	November 7, 2008	Mount Lemmon	Mount Lemmon Survey	V	500 m	MPC · JPL
533618	2014 KL_{62}	—	February 11, 2013	Catalina	CSS	EUP	3.2 km	MPC · JPL
533619	2014 KU_{62}	—	May 19, 2006	Mount Lemmon	Mount Lemmon Survey	3:2 · SHU	5.0 km	MPC · JPL
533620	2014 KN_{68}	—	May 9, 2014	Haleakala	Pan-STARRS 1	·	2.4 km	MPC · JPL
533621	2014 KK_{72}	—	May 5, 2014	Mount Lemmon	Mount Lemmon Survey	URS	3.0 km	MPC · JPL
533622	2014 KM_{73}	—	October 26, 2011	Haleakala	Pan-STARRS 1	·	3.2 km	MPC · JPL
533623	2014 KK_{74}	—	May 22, 2014	Mount Lemmon	Mount Lemmon Survey	·	2.6 km	MPC · JPL
533624	2014 KW_{74}	—	January 30, 2008	Mount Lemmon	Mount Lemmon Survey	·	1.3 km	MPC · JPL
533625	2014 KZ_{74}	—	April 4, 2014	Kitt Peak	Spacewatch	·	1.6 km	MPC · JPL
533626	2014 KJ_{78}	—	April 27, 2009	Mount Lemmon	Mount Lemmon Survey	·	1.8 km	MPC · JPL
533627	2014 KQ_{78}	—	April 15, 2007	Kitt Peak	Spacewatch	·	520 m	MPC · JPL
533628	2014 KU_{78}	—	May 6, 2014	Haleakala	Pan-STARRS 1	·	2.5 km	MPC · JPL
533629	2014 KC_{79}	—	May 27, 2014	Mount Lemmon	Mount Lemmon Survey	·	1.1 km	MPC · JPL
533630	2014 KG_{80}	—	January 18, 2008	Mount Lemmon	Mount Lemmon Survey	·	1.9 km	MPC · JPL
533631	2014 KH_{80}	—	November 2, 2010	Mount Lemmon	Mount Lemmon Survey	THB	3.3 km	MPC · JPL
533632	2014 KL_{80}	—	March 8, 2008	Mount Lemmon	Mount Lemmon Survey	·	1.8 km	MPC · JPL
533633	2014 KW_{81}	—	March 28, 2008	Mount Lemmon	Mount Lemmon Survey	THM	1.9 km	MPC · JPL
533634	2014 KW_{83}	—	October 17, 2012	Haleakala	Pan-STARRS 1	H	550 m	MPC · JPL
533635	2014 KK_{84}	—	May 28, 2014	Haleakala	Pan-STARRS 1	H	530 m	MPC · JPL
533636	2014 KF_{85}	—	October 8, 2012	Mount Lemmon	Mount Lemmon Survey	H	330 m	MPC · JPL
533637	2014 KG_{85}	—	November 24, 2012	Haleakala	Pan-STARRS 1	H	530 m	MPC · JPL
533638	2014 KT_{86}	—	May 27, 2014	Haleakala	Pan-STARRS 1	APO	300 m	MPC · JPL
533639	2014 KE_{89}	—	May 10, 2014	Haleakala	Pan-STARRS 1	·	2.8 km	MPC · JPL
533640	2014 KY_{90}	—	February 4, 2011	Catalina	CSS	H	390 m	MPC · JPL
533641	2014 KV_{92}	—	October 3, 1999	Kitt Peak	Spacewatch	EUP	2.8 km	MPC · JPL
533642	2014 KP_{93}	—	May 21, 2014	Haleakala	Pan-STARRS 1	·	2.8 km	MPC · JPL
533643	2014 KS_{94}	—	January 5, 2013	Mount Lemmon	Mount Lemmon Survey	·	2.0 km	MPC · JPL
533644	2014 KR_{96}	—	September 9, 2008	Mount Lemmon	Mount Lemmon Survey	·	610 m	MPC · JPL
533645	2014 KR_{100}	—	August 20, 2004	Kitt Peak	Spacewatch	·	520 m	MPC · JPL
533646	2014 KN_{102}	—	December 9, 2004	Kitt Peak	Spacewatch	H	540 m	MPC · JPL
533647	2014 KD_{104}	—	May 7, 2014	Haleakala	Pan-STARRS 1	·	2.5 km	MPC · JPL
533648	2014 KO_{104}	—	May 7, 2014	Haleakala	Pan-STARRS 1	·	2.4 km	MPC · JPL
533649	2014 KH_{105}	—	May 20, 2014	Haleakala	Pan-STARRS 1	HYG	2.0 km	MPC · JPL
533650	2014 KN_{106}	—	November 12, 2006	Mount Lemmon	Mount Lemmon Survey	·	1.7 km	MPC · JPL
533651	2014 KA_{107}	—	January 10, 2007	Kitt Peak	Spacewatch	EOS	2.0 km	MPC · JPL
533652	2014 KJ_{107}	—	May 21, 2014	Haleakala	Pan-STARRS 1	·	1.6 km	MPC · JPL
533653	2014 KX_{107}	—	November 6, 2010	Mount Lemmon	Mount Lemmon Survey	·	2.7 km	MPC · JPL
533654	2014 KC_{109}	—	May 23, 2014	Haleakala	Pan-STARRS 1	·	1.8 km	MPC · JPL
533655	2014 KT_{109}	—	May 23, 2014	Haleakala	Pan-STARRS 1	·	1.7 km	MPC · JPL
533656	2014 KU_{109}	—	May 7, 2014	Haleakala	Pan-STARRS 1	·	2.1 km	MPC · JPL
533657	2014 KX_{109}	—	May 23, 2014	Haleakala	Pan-STARRS 1	EOS	1.7 km	MPC · JPL
533658	2014 KH_{110}	—	February 15, 2013	Haleakala	Pan-STARRS 1	EOS	1.4 km	MPC · JPL
533659	2014 KY_{111}	—	March 5, 2013	Haleakala	Pan-STARRS 1	·	2.5 km	MPC · JPL
533660	2014 KL_{112}	—	May 28, 2014	Haleakala	Pan-STARRS 1	·	1.6 km	MPC · JPL
533661	2014 KX_{112}	—	February 17, 2007	Mount Lemmon	Mount Lemmon Survey	·	810 m	MPC · JPL
533662	2014 KD_{113}	—	May 28, 2014	Haleakala	Pan-STARRS 1	(2076)	680 m	MPC · JPL
533663	2014 LZ	—	December 25, 2011	Mount Lemmon	Mount Lemmon Survey	·	3.4 km	MPC · JPL
533664	2014 LQ_{5}	—	April 22, 2007	Kitt Peak	Spacewatch	·	560 m	MPC · JPL
533665	2014 LH_{9}	—	October 9, 2012	Mount Lemmon	Mount Lemmon Survey	H	430 m	MPC · JPL
533666	2014 LV_{10}	—	May 7, 2014	Haleakala	Pan-STARRS 1	·	2.0 km	MPC · JPL
533667	2014 LM_{15}	—	July 18, 2007	Mount Lemmon	Mount Lemmon Survey	·	700 m	MPC · JPL
533668	2014 LW_{17}	—	May 6, 2014	Haleakala	Pan-STARRS 1	·	1.9 km	MPC · JPL
533669	2014 LF_{18}	—	May 7, 2014	Haleakala	Pan-STARRS 1	·	620 m	MPC · JPL
533670	2014 LA_{21}	—	June 5, 2014	Haleakala	Pan-STARRS 1	H	620 m	MPC · JPL
533671 Nabu	2014 LJ_{21}	Nabu	June 5, 2014	Catalina	CSS	T_{j} (2.4) · APO +1km · PHA	2.3 km	MPC · JPL
533672	2014 LT_{23}	—	November 7, 2010	Mount Lemmon	Mount Lemmon Survey	·	2.8 km	MPC · JPL
533673	2014 LB_{27}	—	October 20, 2012	Haleakala	Pan-STARRS 1	H	450 m	MPC · JPL
533674	2014 LJ_{27}	—	November 1, 2011	Kitt Peak	Spacewatch	PHO	1.1 km	MPC · JPL
533675	2014 LU_{27}	—	July 1, 2011	Haleakala	Pan-STARRS 1	·	1.1 km	MPC · JPL
533676	2014 LS_{28}	—	June 3, 2014	Haleakala	Pan-STARRS 1	cubewano (cold)	195 km	MPC · JPL
533677	2014 LX_{28}	—	June 7, 2014	Haleakala	Pan-STARRS 1	H	480 m	MPC · JPL
533678	2014 LG_{30}	—	February 14, 2013	Mount Lemmon	Mount Lemmon Survey	·	2.2 km	MPC · JPL
533679	2014 LH_{30}	—	October 14, 2007	Mount Lemmon	Mount Lemmon Survey	·	1.2 km	MPC · JPL
533680	2014 LJ_{30}	—	October 2, 2003	Kitt Peak	Spacewatch	V	600 m	MPC · JPL
533681	2014 LL_{31}	—	February 14, 2013	Haleakala	Pan-STARRS 1	·	860 m	MPC · JPL
533682	2014 LY_{31}	—	June 4, 2014	Haleakala	Pan-STARRS 1	EUP	3.4 km	MPC · JPL
533683	2014 LF_{32}	—	April 14, 2008	Mount Lemmon	Mount Lemmon Survey	·	2.3 km	MPC · JPL
533684	2014 LM_{32}	—	October 8, 2004	Kitt Peak	Spacewatch	TIR	2.3 km	MPC · JPL
533685	2014 LT_{32}	—	June 22, 2006	Kitt Peak	Spacewatch	·	1.1 km	MPC · JPL
533686	2014 MT_{2}	—	June 19, 2014	Haleakala	Pan-STARRS 1	H	660 m	MPC · JPL
533687	2014 MK_{3}	—	December 23, 2012	Haleakala	Pan-STARRS 1	T_{j} (2.99)	2.6 km	MPC · JPL
533688	2014 MV_{7}	—	November 8, 2007	Catalina	CSS	·	1.1 km	MPC · JPL
533689	2014 MG_{12}	—	April 3, 2008	Mount Lemmon	Mount Lemmon Survey	·	2.6 km	MPC · JPL
533690	2014 MA_{14}	—	March 7, 2013	Mount Lemmon	Mount Lemmon Survey	·	2.5 km	MPC · JPL
533691	2014 MF_{14}	—	June 22, 2014	Mount Lemmon	Mount Lemmon Survey	LIX	3.2 km	MPC · JPL
533692	2014 MH_{17}	—	October 23, 2003	Kitt Peak	Spacewatch	·	850 m	MPC · JPL
533693	2014 MX_{18}	—	April 25, 2011	Mount Lemmon	Mount Lemmon Survey	H	470 m	MPC · JPL
533694	2014 MY_{20}	—	September 30, 1999	Kitt Peak	Spacewatch	·	2.8 km	MPC · JPL
533695	2014 MK_{24}	—	November 30, 2011	Kitt Peak	Spacewatch	·	620 m	MPC · JPL
533696	2014 MD_{31}	—	September 20, 2007	Kitt Peak	Spacewatch	·	830 m	MPC · JPL
533697	2014 MR_{31}	—	October 26, 2011	Haleakala	Pan-STARRS 1	·	730 m	MPC · JPL
533698	2014 MJ_{32}	—	March 27, 2008	Mount Lemmon	Mount Lemmon Survey	·	2.6 km	MPC · JPL
533699	2014 MG_{39}	—	December 6, 2011	Haleakala	Pan-STARRS 1	NYS	650 m	MPC · JPL
533700	2014 MT_{39}	—	June 27, 2014	Haleakala	Pan-STARRS 1	·	670 m	MPC · JPL

== 533701–533800 ==
back to top

Designation			Discovery			Properties		Ref
Permanent	Provisional	Named after	Date	Site	Discoverer(s)	Category	Diam.	Ref
533701	2014 MZ_{41}	—	December 23, 2012	Haleakala	Pan-STARRS 1	H	590 m	MPC · JPL
533702	2014 MD_{53}	—	April 5, 2008	Mount Lemmon	Mount Lemmon Survey	LIX	2.4 km	MPC · JPL
533703	2014 MG_{63}	—	June 28, 2014	Haleakala	Pan-STARRS 1	·	880 m	MPC · JPL
533704	2014 MZ_{69}	—	June 28, 2014	Haleakala	Pan-STARRS 1	cubewano (hot)	277 km	MPC · JPL
533705	2014 MC_{72}	—	October 22, 2006	Catalina	CSS	EUN	1.0 km	MPC · JPL
533706	2014 ML_{72}	—	February 14, 2013	Haleakala	Pan-STARRS 1	MRX	880 m	MPC · JPL
533707	2014 MU_{78}	—	June 21, 2014	Haleakala	Pan-STARRS 1	·	800 m	MPC · JPL
533708	2014 MW_{78}	—	June 24, 2014	Haleakala	Pan-STARRS 1	·	1.2 km	MPC · JPL
533709	2014 NQ_{1}	—	September 16, 2009	Kitt Peak	Spacewatch	·	2.9 km	MPC · JPL
533710	2014 NC_{2}	—	June 3, 2014	Haleakala	Pan-STARRS 1	·	3.1 km	MPC · JPL
533711	2014 NA_{3}	—	August 7, 2007	Siding Spring	SSS	·	650 m	MPC · JPL
533712	2014 NL_{3}	—	August 10, 2009	Kitt Peak	Spacewatch	·	1.8 km	MPC · JPL
533713	2014 NU_{6}	—	November 19, 2003	Anderson Mesa	LONEOS	NYS	1.3 km	MPC · JPL
533714	2014 NX_{7}	—	February 3, 2013	Haleakala	Pan-STARRS 1	·	600 m	MPC · JPL
533715	2014 NE_{17}	—	May 5, 2014	Mount Lemmon	Mount Lemmon Survey	EOS	1.5 km	MPC · JPL
533716	2014 NO_{28}	—	September 8, 2000	Kitt Peak	Spacewatch	·	650 m	MPC · JPL
533717	2014 NT_{36}	—	November 24, 2009	Kitt Peak	Spacewatch	THB	2.8 km	MPC · JPL
533718	2014 NW_{37}	—	September 27, 2007	Mount Lemmon	Mount Lemmon Survey	·	1.1 km	MPC · JPL
533719	2014 NH_{38}	—	January 11, 2008	Kitt Peak	Spacewatch	H	600 m	MPC · JPL
533720	2014 NR_{45}	—	November 3, 2007	Mount Lemmon	Mount Lemmon Survey	·	990 m	MPC · JPL
533721	2014 NT_{45}	—	September 13, 2007	Socorro	LINEAR	·	820 m	MPC · JPL
533722	2014 NE_{52}	—	May 25, 2014	Haleakala	Pan-STARRS 1	APO +1km · PHA	700 m	MPC · JPL
533723	2014 NG_{52}	—	May 20, 2011	Haleakala	Pan-STARRS 1	H	480 m	MPC · JPL
533724	2014 NE_{55}	—	June 28, 2014	Haleakala	Pan-STARRS 1	V	490 m	MPC · JPL
533725	2014 NS_{55}	—	January 2, 2009	Mount Lemmon	Mount Lemmon Survey	·	690 m	MPC · JPL
533726	2014 NK_{59}	—	June 5, 2014	Haleakala	Pan-STARRS 1	·	730 m	MPC · JPL
533727	2014 NZ_{59}	—	September 13, 2007	Mount Lemmon	Mount Lemmon Survey	·	600 m	MPC · JPL
533728	2014 NJ_{61}	—	December 22, 2008	Kitt Peak	Spacewatch	·	520 m	MPC · JPL
533729	2014 NX_{63}	—	August 17, 2010	WISE	WISE	·	3.2 km	MPC · JPL
533730	2014 NW_{67}	—	October 18, 2007	Mount Lemmon	Mount Lemmon Survey	·	980 m	MPC · JPL
533731	2014 NY_{68}	—	January 19, 2012	Haleakala	Pan-STARRS 1	CYB	3.6 km	MPC · JPL
533732	2014 NH_{69}	—	July 7, 2014	Haleakala	Pan-STARRS 1	·	940 m	MPC · JPL
533733	2014 NA_{70}	—	March 14, 2013	Catalina	CSS	·	2.8 km	MPC · JPL
533734	2014 NU_{70}	—	September 21, 2011	Kitt Peak	Spacewatch	·	600 m	MPC · JPL
533735	2014 OB_{3}	—	July 3, 2014	Haleakala	Pan-STARRS 1	·	860 m	MPC · JPL
533736	2014 OG_{3}	—	November 3, 2007	Socorro	LINEAR	PHO	1.0 km	MPC · JPL
533737	2014 OB_{10}	—	September 22, 2003	Kitt Peak	Spacewatch	·	880 m	MPC · JPL
533738	2014 OB_{16}	—	September 10, 2007	Kitt Peak	Spacewatch	MAS	560 m	MPC · JPL
533739	2014 OB_{23}	—	June 2, 2014	Haleakala	Pan-STARRS 1	·	2.6 km	MPC · JPL
533740	2014 OG_{23}	—	October 24, 2011	Haleakala	Pan-STARRS 1	·	560 m	MPC · JPL
533741	2014 OL_{33}	—	April 9, 2010	Kitt Peak	Spacewatch	·	630 m	MPC · JPL
533742	2014 OH_{34}	—	October 26, 2011	Haleakala	Pan-STARRS 1	·	570 m	MPC · JPL
533743	2014 OV_{39}	—	December 25, 2011	Kitt Peak	Spacewatch	·	690 m	MPC · JPL
533744	2014 OA_{40}	—	January 21, 2012	Kitt Peak	Spacewatch	·	720 m	MPC · JPL
533745	2014 OG_{40}	—	July 25, 2014	Haleakala	Pan-STARRS 1	·	810 m	MPC · JPL
533746	2014 OH_{44}	—	October 27, 2011	Catalina	CSS	·	520 m	MPC · JPL
533747	2014 OG_{46}	—	October 25, 2011	XuYi	PMO NEO Survey Program	·	580 m	MPC · JPL
533748	2014 OY_{46}	—	November 19, 2001	Socorro	LINEAR	·	600 m	MPC · JPL
533749	2014 OV_{57}	—	October 27, 2011	Mount Lemmon	Mount Lemmon Survey	·	570 m	MPC · JPL
533750	2014 OT_{64}	—	May 24, 2006	Mount Lemmon	Mount Lemmon Survey	·	830 m	MPC · JPL
533751	2014 OR_{71}	—	June 26, 2014	Haleakala	Pan-STARRS 1	·	1 km	MPC · JPL
533752	2014 OW_{71}	—	October 9, 2007	Mount Lemmon	Mount Lemmon Survey	·	1.1 km	MPC · JPL
533753	2014 ON_{72}	—	June 26, 2014	Haleakala	Pan-STARRS 1	·	890 m	MPC · JPL
533754	2014 OF_{85}	—	November 19, 2008	Kitt Peak	Spacewatch	·	580 m	MPC · JPL
533755	2014 OD_{93}	—	September 9, 2004	Kitt Peak	Spacewatch	·	610 m	MPC · JPL
533756	2014 OW_{94}	—	December 31, 2011	Kitt Peak	Spacewatch	·	1.2 km	MPC · JPL
533757	2014 OG_{95}	—	November 3, 2011	Kitt Peak	Spacewatch	·	560 m	MPC · JPL
533758	2014 OV_{95}	—	February 24, 2008	Mount Lemmon	Mount Lemmon Survey	·	1 km	MPC · JPL
533759	2014 OQ_{96}	—	September 5, 2007	Mount Lemmon	Mount Lemmon Survey	·	740 m	MPC · JPL
533760	2014 OJ_{97}	—	July 26, 2014	Haleakala	Pan-STARRS 1	·	1.2 km	MPC · JPL
533761	2014 OV_{97}	—	October 3, 2003	Kitt Peak	Spacewatch	·	910 m	MPC · JPL
533762	2014 OC_{98}	—	March 5, 2013	Haleakala	Pan-STARRS 1	(2076)	640 m	MPC · JPL
533763	2014 ON_{101}	—	October 2, 2008	Mount Lemmon	Mount Lemmon Survey	CYB	3.3 km	MPC · JPL
533764	2014 OT_{101}	—	October 23, 2011	Haleakala	Pan-STARRS 1	·	720 m	MPC · JPL
533765	2014 OW_{104}	—	February 14, 2013	Haleakala	Pan-STARRS 1	LIX	4.1 km	MPC · JPL
533766	2014 OY_{104}	—	May 23, 2014	Haleakala	Pan-STARRS 1	H	560 m	MPC · JPL
533767	2014 OE_{105}	—	March 12, 2008	Kitt Peak	Spacewatch	·	2.3 km	MPC · JPL
533768	2014 OG_{106}	—	July 3, 2014	Haleakala	Pan-STARRS 1	V	500 m	MPC · JPL
533769	2014 OP_{109}	—	August 21, 2007	Anderson Mesa	LONEOS	·	710 m	MPC · JPL
533770	2014 OX_{125}	—	September 26, 2011	Haleakala	Pan-STARRS 1	·	500 m	MPC · JPL
533771	2014 OF_{129}	—	March 31, 2013	Mount Lemmon	Mount Lemmon Survey	·	790 m	MPC · JPL
533772	2014 OW_{130}	—	March 29, 2008	Kitt Peak	Spacewatch	TIR	2.5 km	MPC · JPL
533773	2014 OH_{132}	—	May 25, 2014	Haleakala	Pan-STARRS 1	·	820 m	MPC · JPL
533774	2014 OB_{133}	—	March 27, 1996	Kitt Peak	Spacewatch	·	840 m	MPC · JPL
533775	2014 OJ_{140}	—	May 25, 2014	Haleakala	Pan-STARRS 1	·	1.3 km	MPC · JPL
533776	2014 OD_{144}	—	September 13, 2007	Mount Lemmon	Mount Lemmon Survey	MAS	500 m	MPC · JPL
533777	2014 OU_{144}	—	October 8, 2007	Mount Lemmon	Mount Lemmon Survey	NYS	980 m	MPC · JPL
533778	2014 OA_{153}	—	January 31, 2009	Kitt Peak	Spacewatch	·	650 m	MPC · JPL
533779	2014 OA_{156}	—	September 26, 2011	Mount Lemmon	Mount Lemmon Survey	·	580 m	MPC · JPL
533780	2014 OM_{156}	—	November 30, 2005	Kitt Peak	Spacewatch	·	630 m	MPC · JPL
533781	2014 OF_{158}	—	May 25, 2014	Haleakala	Pan-STARRS 1	V	540 m	MPC · JPL
533782	2014 OL_{160}	—	February 9, 2013	Haleakala	Pan-STARRS 1	·	690 m	MPC · JPL
533783	2014 ON_{162}	—	December 2, 2004	Kitt Peak	Spacewatch	·	760 m	MPC · JPL
533784	2014 OD_{163}	—	September 12, 2007	Kitt Peak	Spacewatch	NYS	770 m	MPC · JPL
533785	2014 OX_{169}	—	September 18, 2007	Kitt Peak	Spacewatch	V	620 m	MPC · JPL
533786	2014 OO_{170}	—	June 29, 2014	Haleakala	Pan-STARRS 1	·	3.0 km	MPC · JPL
533787	2014 OF_{174}	—	November 1, 2008	Mount Lemmon	Mount Lemmon Survey	(2076)	700 m	MPC · JPL
533788	2014 OT_{178}	—	November 8, 2008	Mount Lemmon	Mount Lemmon Survey	·	660 m	MPC · JPL
533789	2014 OT_{180}	—	January 19, 2012	Haleakala	Pan-STARRS 1	PHO	910 m	MPC · JPL
533790	2014 ON_{182}	—	February 17, 2013	Kitt Peak	Spacewatch	·	890 m	MPC · JPL
533791	2014 OH_{184}	—	November 1, 2011	Mount Lemmon	Mount Lemmon Survey	V	610 m	MPC · JPL
533792	2014 OP_{184}	—	June 28, 2014	Haleakala	Pan-STARRS 1	V	490 m	MPC · JPL
533793	2014 OL_{185}	—	September 23, 2011	Haleakala	Pan-STARRS 1	·	870 m	MPC · JPL
533794	2014 OY_{185}	—	March 16, 2013	Kitt Peak	Spacewatch	·	780 m	MPC · JPL
533795	2014 OU_{187}	—	November 3, 2007	Mount Lemmon	Mount Lemmon Survey	·	910 m	MPC · JPL
533796	2014 OW_{187}	—	February 11, 2004	Kitt Peak	Spacewatch	·	1.2 km	MPC · JPL
533797	2014 OX_{188}	—	November 14, 2007	Kitt Peak	Spacewatch	·	930 m	MPC · JPL
533798	2014 OB_{195}	—	May 23, 2006	Kitt Peak	Spacewatch	·	1 km	MPC · JPL
533799	2014 ON_{195}	—	April 30, 2006	Kitt Peak	Spacewatch	·	980 m	MPC · JPL
533800	2014 OX_{196}	—	July 27, 2014	Haleakala	Pan-STARRS 1	·	1.1 km	MPC · JPL

== 533801–533900 ==
back to top

Designation			Discovery			Properties		Ref
Permanent	Provisional	Named after	Date	Site	Discoverer(s)	Category	Diam.	Ref
533801	2014 OS_{197}	—	August 2, 2010	Socorro	LINEAR	·	1.1 km	MPC · JPL
533802	2014 OX_{197}	—	August 21, 2007	Anderson Mesa	LONEOS	·	580 m	MPC · JPL
533803	2014 OK_{198}	—	July 27, 2014	Haleakala	Pan-STARRS 1	NYS	950 m	MPC · JPL
533804	2014 OR_{199}	—	May 7, 2014	Haleakala	Pan-STARRS 1	T_{j} (2.96)	3.5 km	MPC · JPL
533805	2014 OB_{200}	—	July 28, 2014	Haleakala	Pan-STARRS 1	·	1.1 km	MPC · JPL
533806	2014 OR_{201}	—	October 26, 2011	Haleakala	Pan-STARRS 1	·	630 m	MPC · JPL
533807	2014 OH_{203}	—	August 30, 2011	Haleakala	Pan-STARRS 1	·	620 m	MPC · JPL
533808	2014 OP_{205}	—	October 2, 1997	Caussols	ODAS	·	650 m	MPC · JPL
533809	2014 OM_{208}	—	October 8, 2007	Mount Lemmon	Mount Lemmon Survey	3:2	4.5 km	MPC · JPL
533810	2014 OU_{208}	—	September 23, 2011	Haleakala	Pan-STARRS 1	·	550 m	MPC · JPL
533811	2014 OC_{212}	—	June 9, 1999	Kitt Peak	Spacewatch	·	920 m	MPC · JPL
533812	2014 OB_{214}	—	September 11, 2007	Mount Lemmon	Mount Lemmon Survey	MAS	580 m	MPC · JPL
533813	2014 OP_{219}	—	September 23, 2011	Haleakala	Pan-STARRS 1	·	600 m	MPC · JPL
533814	2014 OE_{224}	—	June 24, 2014	Haleakala	Pan-STARRS 1	H	330 m	MPC · JPL
533815	2014 ON_{225}	—	October 2, 2003	Kitt Peak	Spacewatch	·	1.0 km	MPC · JPL
533816	2014 OC_{229}	—	December 6, 2007	Kitt Peak	Spacewatch	NYS	990 m	MPC · JPL
533817	2014 OE_{230}	—	October 21, 2003	Kitt Peak	Spacewatch	MAS	580 m	MPC · JPL
533818	2014 OL_{230}	—	December 18, 2007	Kitt Peak	Spacewatch	NYS	920 m	MPC · JPL
533819	2014 OO_{230}	—	July 27, 2014	Haleakala	Pan-STARRS 1	·	780 m	MPC · JPL
533820	2014 OA_{231}	—	February 4, 2012	Haleakala	Pan-STARRS 1	NYS	1.1 km	MPC · JPL
533821	2014 OR_{232}	—	July 27, 2014	Haleakala	Pan-STARRS 1	·	1 km	MPC · JPL
533822	2014 ON_{234}	—	June 29, 2014	Haleakala	Pan-STARRS 1	·	1.4 km	MPC · JPL
533823	2014 OP_{240}	—	September 8, 2007	Mount Lemmon	Mount Lemmon Survey	MAS	500 m	MPC · JPL
533824	2014 OZ_{242}	—	October 19, 2007	Catalina	CSS	·	860 m	MPC · JPL
533825	2014 OR_{244}	—	September 22, 2011	Kitt Peak	Spacewatch	·	580 m	MPC · JPL
533826	2014 OV_{254}	—	December 2, 2010	Mount Lemmon	Mount Lemmon Survey	·	4.1 km	MPC · JPL
533827	2014 OU_{276}	—	September 28, 2011	Kitt Peak	Spacewatch	·	500 m	MPC · JPL
533828	2014 OQ_{278}	—	December 25, 2011	Mount Lemmon	Mount Lemmon Survey	·	810 m	MPC · JPL
533829	2014 OQ_{288}	—	September 5, 2007	Catalina	CSS	·	820 m	MPC · JPL
533830	2014 OV_{288}	—	July 8, 2014	Haleakala	Pan-STARRS 1	H	370 m	MPC · JPL
533831	2014 OY_{289}	—	October 10, 2004	Kitt Peak	Spacewatch	·	440 m	MPC · JPL
533832	2014 OF_{293}	—	July 29, 2014	Haleakala	Pan-STARRS 1	·	860 m	MPC · JPL
533833	2014 OH_{293}	—	July 29, 2014	Haleakala	Pan-STARRS 1	·	780 m	MPC · JPL
533834	2014 ON_{294}	—	July 29, 2014	Haleakala	Pan-STARRS 1	MAS	740 m	MPC · JPL
533835	2014 OR_{296}	—	October 1, 2010	Catalina	CSS	·	780 m	MPC · JPL
533836	2014 OM_{297}	—	October 23, 2003	Kitt Peak	Spacewatch	·	1.2 km	MPC · JPL
533837	2014 OJ_{299}	—	September 13, 2007	Kitt Peak	Spacewatch	·	720 m	MPC · JPL
533838	2014 OK_{299}	—	September 4, 1999	Kitt Peak	Spacewatch	MAS	650 m	MPC · JPL
533839	2014 OE_{307}	—	October 19, 2003	Kitt Peak	Spacewatch	NYS	960 m	MPC · JPL
533840	2014 OH_{307}	—	July 26, 2014	Haleakala	Pan-STARRS 1	NYS	910 m	MPC · JPL
533841	2014 OZ_{310}	—	October 22, 2008	Kitt Peak	Spacewatch	·	630 m	MPC · JPL
533842	2014 OH_{314}	—	December 5, 2007	Mount Lemmon	Mount Lemmon Survey	·	1.0 km	MPC · JPL
533843	2014 OW_{317}	—	November 30, 2003	Kitt Peak	Spacewatch	MAS	520 m	MPC · JPL
533844	2014 ON_{326}	—	November 3, 2011	Mount Lemmon	Mount Lemmon Survey	V	450 m	MPC · JPL
533845	2014 OA_{334}	—	December 30, 2007	Kitt Peak	Spacewatch	·	1.3 km	MPC · JPL
533846	2014 OX_{334}	—	September 24, 2007	Kitt Peak	Spacewatch	·	760 m	MPC · JPL
533847	2014 OF_{337}	—	January 16, 2005	Kitt Peak	Spacewatch	·	890 m	MPC · JPL
533848	2014 OL_{337}	—	April 7, 2013	Mount Lemmon	Mount Lemmon Survey	NYS	1.2 km	MPC · JPL
533849	2014 OH_{338}	—	June 30, 2014	Mount Lemmon	Mount Lemmon Survey	·	1.5 km	MPC · JPL
533850	2014 OD_{339}	—	August 30, 2010	La Sagra	OAM	·	660 m	MPC · JPL
533851	2014 OP_{343}	—	October 15, 2007	Catalina	CSS	·	940 m	MPC · JPL
533852	2014 OR_{343}	—	November 14, 2007	Kitt Peak	Spacewatch	NYS	1.1 km	MPC · JPL
533853	2014 OW_{343}	—	November 19, 2003	Kitt Peak	Spacewatch	·	1.1 km	MPC · JPL
533854	2014 OC_{352}	—	February 1, 2006	Kitt Peak	Spacewatch	·	2.6 km	MPC · JPL
533855	2014 OT_{353}	—	June 1, 2014	Haleakala	Pan-STARRS 1	PHO	710 m	MPC · JPL
533856	2014 OG_{357}	—	September 15, 2007	Mount Lemmon	Mount Lemmon Survey	NYS	690 m	MPC · JPL
533857	2014 OA_{367}	—	September 12, 2007	Mount Lemmon	Mount Lemmon Survey	·	630 m	MPC · JPL
533858	2014 OC_{367}	—	July 30, 2014	Kitt Peak	Spacewatch	·	490 m	MPC · JPL
533859	2014 OC_{372}	—	October 17, 1995	Kitt Peak	Spacewatch	·	1.3 km	MPC · JPL
533860	2014 OL_{375}	—	March 12, 2010	Kitt Peak	Spacewatch	·	680 m	MPC · JPL
533861	2014 OY_{377}	—	December 31, 2007	Kitt Peak	Spacewatch	·	1.4 km	MPC · JPL
533862	2014 OY_{378}	—	June 26, 2014	Haleakala	Pan-STARRS 1	PHO	1.1 km	MPC · JPL
533863	2014 OP_{380}	—	June 30, 2014	Haleakala	Pan-STARRS 1	·	2.5 km	MPC · JPL
533864	2014 ON_{381}	—	June 5, 2014	Haleakala	Pan-STARRS 1	·	1.0 km	MPC · JPL
533865	2014 OS_{389}	—	December 23, 2012	Haleakala	Pan-STARRS 1	H	510 m	MPC · JPL
533866	2014 OK_{391}	—	July 31, 2014	Haleakala	Pan-STARRS 1	·	1.3 km	MPC · JPL
533867	2014 OY_{392}	—	October 24, 2011	Haleakala	Pan-STARRS 1	·	810 m	MPC · JPL
533868	2014 OG_{394}	—	July 28, 2014	Haleakala	Pan-STARRS 1	other TNO	200 km	MPC · JPL
533869	2014 OX_{399}	—	September 19, 2003	Kitt Peak	Spacewatch	V	830 m	MPC · JPL
533870	2014 OX_{400}	—	November 26, 2011	Kitt Peak	Spacewatch	·	770 m	MPC · JPL
533871	2014 OG_{401}	—	July 28, 2014	Haleakala	Pan-STARRS 1	·	880 m	MPC · JPL
533872	2014 OF_{402}	—	July 31, 2014	Haleakala	Pan-STARRS 1	MAR	790 m	MPC · JPL
533873	2014 OH_{402}	—	July 28, 2014	Haleakala	Pan-STARRS 1	·	580 m	MPC · JPL
533874	2014 OB_{404}	—	July 28, 2014	Haleakala	Pan-STARRS 1	BAR	1.2 km	MPC · JPL
533875	2014 OE_{404}	—	July 25, 2014	Haleakala	Pan-STARRS 1	V	540 m	MPC · JPL
533876	2014 OV_{404}	—	July 30, 2014	Haleakala	Pan-STARRS 1	·	900 m	MPC · JPL
533877	2014 OW_{404}	—	October 1, 2005	Mount Lemmon	Mount Lemmon Survey	AST	1.5 km	MPC · JPL
533878	2014 OB_{407}	—	September 24, 2011	Haleakala	Pan-STARRS 1	·	710 m	MPC · JPL
533879	2014 OT_{415}	—	July 25, 2014	Haleakala	Pan-STARRS 1	NYS	840 m	MPC · JPL
533880	2014 OU_{415}	—	July 28, 2014	Haleakala	Pan-STARRS 1	·	690 m	MPC · JPL
533881	2014 OW_{415}	—	July 31, 2014	Haleakala	Pan-STARRS 1	·	900 m	MPC · JPL
533882	2014 PD_{2}	—	October 9, 2007	Mount Lemmon	Mount Lemmon Survey	·	950 m	MPC · JPL
533883	2014 PZ_{6}	—	June 21, 2014	Haleakala	Pan-STARRS 1	·	670 m	MPC · JPL
533884	2014 PP_{8}	—	August 23, 2007	Kitt Peak	Spacewatch	·	740 m	MPC · JPL
533885	2014 PX_{9}	—	January 26, 2012	Mount Lemmon	Mount Lemmon Survey	NYS	990 m	MPC · JPL
533886	2014 PK_{13}	—	October 1, 2011	Mount Lemmon	Mount Lemmon Survey	·	500 m	MPC · JPL
533887	2014 PU_{14}	—	July 25, 2014	Haleakala	Pan-STARRS 1	·	760 m	MPC · JPL
533888	2014 PD_{15}	—	September 10, 2007	Kitt Peak	Spacewatch	·	870 m	MPC · JPL
533889	2014 PA_{16}	—	July 25, 2014	Haleakala	Pan-STARRS 1	·	860 m	MPC · JPL
533890	2014 PX_{20}	—	September 18, 2003	Kitt Peak	Spacewatch	·	880 m	MPC · JPL
533891	2014 PC_{21}	—	March 25, 2010	Mount Lemmon	Mount Lemmon Survey	·	660 m	MPC · JPL
533892	2014 PK_{22}	—	September 9, 2007	Kitt Peak	Spacewatch	·	730 m	MPC · JPL
533893	2014 PP_{25}	—	September 18, 2007	Anderson Mesa	LONEOS	V	670 m	MPC · JPL
533894	2014 PM_{28}	—	February 10, 2010	WISE	WISE	·	1.6 km	MPC · JPL
533895	2014 PM_{32}	—	November 10, 1999	Kitt Peak	Spacewatch	NYS	860 m	MPC · JPL
533896	2014 PE_{35}	—	July 18, 2007	Mount Lemmon	Mount Lemmon Survey	·	850 m	MPC · JPL
533897	2014 PM_{35}	—	June 26, 2014	Haleakala	Pan-STARRS 1	·	1.1 km	MPC · JPL
533898	2014 PW_{38}	—	June 24, 2014	Mount Lemmon	Mount Lemmon Survey	·	1.2 km	MPC · JPL
533899	2014 PS_{39}	—	September 14, 2007	Kitt Peak	Spacewatch	·	660 m	MPC · JPL
533900	2014 PC_{42}	—	July 7, 2014	Haleakala	Pan-STARRS 1	PHO	860 m	MPC · JPL

== 533901–534000 ==
back to top

Designation			Discovery			Properties		Ref
Permanent	Provisional	Named after	Date	Site	Discoverer(s)	Category	Diam.	Ref
533901	2014 PE_{42}	—	August 29, 2006	Catalina	CSS	·	870 m	MPC · JPL
533902	2014 PS_{44}	—	September 10, 2007	Kitt Peak	Spacewatch	·	960 m	MPC · JPL
533903	2014 PN_{47}	—	October 19, 2003	Kitt Peak	Spacewatch	·	1.1 km	MPC · JPL
533904	2014 PG_{49}	—	June 26, 2014	Haleakala	Pan-STARRS 1	NYS	900 m	MPC · JPL
533905	2014 PX_{49}	—	September 10, 2007	Mount Lemmon	Mount Lemmon Survey	·	650 m	MPC · JPL
533906	2014 PZ_{50}	—	October 24, 2011	Haleakala	Pan-STARRS 1	·	740 m	MPC · JPL
533907	2014 PW_{52}	—	June 21, 2014	Mount Lemmon	Mount Lemmon Survey	·	1.2 km	MPC · JPL
533908	2014 PO_{55}	—	June 23, 2014	Mount Lemmon	Mount Lemmon Survey	NYS	930 m	MPC · JPL
533909	2014 PV_{55}	—	October 10, 2007	Mount Lemmon	Mount Lemmon Survey	MAS	580 m	MPC · JPL
533910	2014 PX_{55}	—	July 28, 2014	Haleakala	Pan-STARRS 1	·	970 m	MPC · JPL
533911	2014 PM_{56}	—	September 30, 1991	Kitt Peak	Spacewatch	·	1.1 km	MPC · JPL
533912	2014 PU_{57}	—	August 15, 2010	WISE	WISE	·	4.1 km	MPC · JPL
533913	2014 PO_{62}	—	September 12, 2007	Catalina	CSS	·	1.0 km	MPC · JPL
533914	2014 PA_{63}	—	November 18, 2011	Mount Lemmon	Mount Lemmon Survey	·	770 m	MPC · JPL
533915	2014 PN_{63}	—	November 2, 2007	Mount Lemmon	Mount Lemmon Survey	NYS	810 m	MPC · JPL
533916	2014 PW_{63}	—	October 10, 2007	Kitt Peak	Spacewatch	CLA	1.2 km	MPC · JPL
533917	2014 PA_{64}	—	October 20, 2007	Mount Lemmon	Mount Lemmon Survey	·	820 m	MPC · JPL
533918	2014 PW_{65}	—	September 17, 2003	Kitt Peak	Spacewatch	·	900 m	MPC · JPL
533919	2014 PY_{65}	—	December 10, 2004	Kitt Peak	Spacewatch	·	840 m	MPC · JPL
533920	2014 PL_{66}	—	November 14, 2007	Kitt Peak	Spacewatch	·	920 m	MPC · JPL
533921	2014 PC_{70}	—	August 14, 2014	Haleakala	Pan-STARRS 1	·	1.4 km	MPC · JPL
533922	2014 PB_{72}	—	July 19, 2007	Mount Lemmon	Mount Lemmon Survey	·	1.0 km	MPC · JPL
533923	2014 PW_{72}	—	March 18, 2013	Mount Lemmon	Mount Lemmon Survey	·	750 m	MPC · JPL
533924	2014 PG_{74}	—	December 15, 2007	Kitt Peak	Spacewatch	V	570 m	MPC · JPL
533925	2014 PK_{75}	—	January 1, 2012	Mount Lemmon	Mount Lemmon Survey	·	860 m	MPC · JPL
533926	2014 PC_{78}	—	November 30, 2003	Kitt Peak	Spacewatch	V	560 m	MPC · JPL
533927	2014 PK_{78}	—	October 20, 2011	Haleakala	Pan-STARRS 1	·	1.7 km	MPC · JPL
533928	2014 PT_{78}	—	April 15, 2010	Kitt Peak	Spacewatch	·	760 m	MPC · JPL
533929	2014 PG_{79}	—	August 23, 2007	Kitt Peak	Spacewatch	·	760 m	MPC · JPL
533930	2014 PO_{79}	—	September 10, 2007	Mount Lemmon	Mount Lemmon Survey	·	700 m	MPC · JPL
533931	2014 PN_{80}	—	September 27, 2011	Mount Lemmon	Mount Lemmon Survey	·	580 m	MPC · JPL
533932	2014 PP_{80}	—	October 9, 2007	Mount Lemmon	Mount Lemmon Survey	NYS	930 m	MPC · JPL
533933	2014 PJ_{82}	—	August 3, 2014	Haleakala	Pan-STARRS 1	·	650 m	MPC · JPL
533934	2014 QT_{1}	—	November 18, 2011	Kitt Peak	Spacewatch	·	740 m	MPC · JPL
533935	2014 QA_{4}	—	July 30, 2009	Kitt Peak	Spacewatch	·	2.1 km	MPC · JPL
533936	2014 QP_{19}	—	July 29, 2014	Haleakala	Pan-STARRS 1	·	1.1 km	MPC · JPL
533937	2014 QZ_{19}	—	August 18, 2014	Haleakala	Pan-STARRS 1	·	980 m	MPC · JPL
533938	2014 QO_{22}	—	February 14, 2013	Haleakala	Pan-STARRS 1	V	660 m	MPC · JPL
533939	2014 QV_{22}	—	September 29, 2003	Kitt Peak	Spacewatch	V	500 m	MPC · JPL
533940	2014 QO_{23}	—	December 4, 2007	Mount Lemmon	Mount Lemmon Survey	·	850 m	MPC · JPL
533941	2014 QO_{25}	—	February 19, 2009	Mount Lemmon	Mount Lemmon Survey	·	710 m	MPC · JPL
533942	2014 QD_{26}	—	September 13, 2007	Kitt Peak	Spacewatch	·	790 m	MPC · JPL
533943	2014 QV_{26}	—	January 20, 2009	Mount Lemmon	Mount Lemmon Survey	·	720 m	MPC · JPL
533944	2014 QU_{27}	—	July 5, 2014	Haleakala	Pan-STARRS 1	·	640 m	MPC · JPL
533945	2014 QS_{34}	—	October 26, 2011	Haleakala	Pan-STARRS 1	·	590 m	MPC · JPL
533946	2014 QT_{34}	—	July 28, 2014	Haleakala	Pan-STARRS 1	·	570 m	MPC · JPL
533947	2014 QL_{35}	—	September 22, 2003	Kitt Peak	Spacewatch	NYS	880 m	MPC · JPL
533948	2014 QM_{36}	—	September 12, 2007	Kitt Peak	Spacewatch	NYS	810 m	MPC · JPL
533949	2014 QT_{46}	—	October 13, 2007	Catalina	CSS	·	590 m	MPC · JPL
533950	2014 QJ_{57}	—	October 11, 2007	Mount Lemmon	Mount Lemmon Survey	·	910 m	MPC · JPL
533951	2014 QD_{60}	—	October 24, 2011	Haleakala	Pan-STARRS 1	·	640 m	MPC · JPL
533952	2014 QJ_{93}	—	December 30, 2008	Mount Lemmon	Mount Lemmon Survey	·	640 m	MPC · JPL
533953	2014 QW_{98}	—	April 6, 2013	Mount Lemmon	Mount Lemmon Survey	·	670 m	MPC · JPL
533954	2014 QU_{108}	—	March 15, 2010	Mount Lemmon	Mount Lemmon Survey	·	2.3 km	MPC · JPL
533955	2014 QX_{117}	—	March 2, 2013	Catalina	CSS	·	1.1 km	MPC · JPL
533956	2014 QG_{127}	—	August 20, 2014	Haleakala	Pan-STARRS 1	V	460 m	MPC · JPL
533957	2014 QQ_{128}	—	January 30, 2006	Kitt Peak	Spacewatch	·	590 m	MPC · JPL
533958	2014 QU_{134}	—	January 4, 2012	Mount Lemmon	Mount Lemmon Survey	·	1.2 km	MPC · JPL
533959	2014 QD_{135}	—	October 10, 2007	Kitt Peak	Spacewatch	CLA	1.6 km	MPC · JPL
533960	2014 QS_{135}	—	January 14, 2012	Mount Lemmon	Mount Lemmon Survey	·	920 m	MPC · JPL
533961	2014 QU_{135}	—	December 30, 2011	Kitt Peak	Spacewatch	MAS	500 m	MPC · JPL
533962	2014 QD_{141}	—	September 30, 2003	Kitt Peak	Spacewatch	·	790 m	MPC · JPL
533963	2014 QJ_{143}	—	July 7, 2014	Haleakala	Pan-STARRS 1	·	880 m	MPC · JPL
533964	2014 QX_{147}	—	July 7, 2014	Haleakala	Pan-STARRS 1	·	590 m	MPC · JPL
533965	2014 QE_{149}	—	December 29, 2011	Mount Lemmon	Mount Lemmon Survey	·	640 m	MPC · JPL
533966	2014 QW_{151}	—	August 20, 2014	Haleakala	Pan-STARRS 1	·	1.4 km	MPC · JPL
533967	2014 QV_{168}	—	August 24, 2014	La Sagra	OAM	·	820 m	MPC · JPL
533968	2014 QD_{171}	—	April 16, 2009	Kitt Peak	Spacewatch	·	1.3 km	MPC · JPL
533969	2014 QL_{172}	—	October 19, 2003	Kitt Peak	Spacewatch	MAS	650 m	MPC · JPL
533970	2014 QS_{172}	—	October 18, 2007	Mount Lemmon	Mount Lemmon Survey	·	790 m	MPC · JPL
533971	2014 QH_{176}	—	November 9, 1993	Kitt Peak	Spacewatch	·	660 m	MPC · JPL
533972	2014 QF_{177}	—	October 20, 1995	Kitt Peak	Spacewatch	MAS	650 m	MPC · JPL
533973	2014 QF_{181}	—	October 9, 2007	Mount Lemmon	Mount Lemmon Survey	·	660 m	MPC · JPL
533974	2014 QR_{186}	—	December 21, 2008	Mount Lemmon	Mount Lemmon Survey	·	700 m	MPC · JPL
533975	2014 QN_{193}	—	July 4, 2014	Haleakala	Pan-STARRS 1	·	960 m	MPC · JPL
533976	2014 QK_{213}	—	June 23, 2014	Mount Lemmon	Mount Lemmon Survey	MAS	540 m	MPC · JPL
533977	2014 QA_{214}	—	July 7, 2014	Haleakala	Pan-STARRS 1	·	830 m	MPC · JPL
533978	2014 QT_{221}	—	September 14, 2007	Anderson Mesa	LONEOS	·	800 m	MPC · JPL
533979	2014 QR_{230}	—	November 2, 2008	Mount Lemmon	Mount Lemmon Survey	·	510 m	MPC · JPL
533980	2014 QT_{231}	—	September 12, 2007	Mount Lemmon	Mount Lemmon Survey	·	620 m	MPC · JPL
533981	2014 QG_{233}	—	October 9, 1999	Socorro	LINEAR	·	930 m	MPC · JPL
533982	2014 QQ_{239}	—	July 7, 2014	Haleakala	Pan-STARRS 1	·	1.0 km	MPC · JPL
533983	2014 QZ_{239}	—	October 13, 2007	Catalina	CSS	·	1.3 km	MPC · JPL
533984	2014 QG_{241}	—	January 25, 2009	Kitt Peak	Spacewatch	·	1.1 km	MPC · JPL
533985	2014 QT_{241}	—	December 3, 2007	Kitt Peak	Spacewatch	·	990 m	MPC · JPL
533986	2014 QN_{242}	—	November 18, 2011	Mount Lemmon	Mount Lemmon Survey	·	680 m	MPC · JPL
533987	2014 QZ_{243}	—	July 7, 2014	Haleakala	Pan-STARRS 1	·	670 m	MPC · JPL
533988	2014 QA_{245}	—	August 16, 2007	XuYi	PMO NEO Survey Program	·	830 m	MPC · JPL
533989	2014 QM_{253}	—	July 31, 2014	Haleakala	Pan-STARRS 1	·	1.0 km	MPC · JPL
533990	2014 QX_{266}	—	August 22, 2014	Haleakala	Pan-STARRS 1	AMO · fast	120 m	MPC · JPL
533991	2014 QG_{267}	—	November 4, 2010	Catalina	CSS	·	1.7 km	MPC · JPL
533992	2014 QL_{267}	—	November 3, 2007	Mount Lemmon	Mount Lemmon Survey	·	960 m	MPC · JPL
533993	2014 QW_{268}	—	September 23, 2011	Haleakala	Pan-STARRS 1	·	400 m	MPC · JPL
533994	2014 QX_{269}	—	July 7, 2014	Haleakala	Pan-STARRS 1	·	1.2 km	MPC · JPL
533995	2014 QS_{274}	—	March 26, 2009	Mount Lemmon	Mount Lemmon Survey	·	1.7 km	MPC · JPL
533996	2014 QC_{275}	—	July 7, 2014	Haleakala	Pan-STARRS 1	ERI	1.0 km	MPC · JPL
533997	2014 QK_{280}	—	July 28, 2014	Haleakala	Pan-STARRS 1	·	780 m	MPC · JPL
533998	2014 QQ_{280}	—	July 28, 2014	Haleakala	Pan-STARRS 1	V	470 m	MPC · JPL
533999	2014 QA_{281}	—	October 19, 2007	Mount Lemmon	Mount Lemmon Survey	·	860 m	MPC · JPL
534000	2014 QM_{281}	—	August 24, 2014	Haleakala	Pan-STARRS 1	·	1.7 km	MPC · JPL

== Meaning of names ==
As minor planet discoveries are confirmed, they are given a permanent number by the IAU's Minor Planet Center (MPC), and the discoverers can then submit names for them, following the IAU's naming conventions. The list below concerns those minor planets in the specified number-range that have received names, and explains the meanings of those names.

Official naming citations of newly named small Solar System bodies are approved and published in a bulletin by IAU's Working Group for Small Bodies Nomenclature (WGSBN). Before May 2021, citations were published in MPC's Minor Planet Circulars for many decades. Recent citations can also be found on the JPL Small-Body Database (SBDB). Until his death in 2016, German astronomer Lutz D. Schmadel compiled these citations into the Dictionary of Minor Planet Names (DMP) and regularly updated the collection.

Based on Paul Herget's The Names of the Minor Planets, Schmadel also researched the unclear origin of numerous asteroids, most of which had been named prior to World War II. This article incorporates text from this source, which is in the public domain: SBDB New namings may only be added to this list below after official publication as the preannouncement of names is condemned. The WGSBN publishes a comprehensive guideline for the naming rules of non-cometary small Solar System bodies.

Named minor planet	Provisional	This minor planet was named for...	Ref · Catalog
533671 Nabu	2014 LJ_{21}	Nabu, Mesopotamian god of writing and wisdom, and the patron of scribes in Babylonian mythology.	IAU · 533671
