= NABO =

NABO or Nabo may refer to:

- National Association of Boat Owners, a boating organization in the UK
- North American Boxing Organization, a boxing organization in the US
- An alternative spelling of the ancient Mesopotamian god Nebo or Nabu
- The Spanish and Portuguese name of Brassica napus
- Nabo Gass (born 1954), German painter and glass artist

== See also ==
- Naboo, a planet in the fictional Star Wars universe
