= Barnówko =

- Village
- Location within Poland
- Coordinates: 52°47′4″N 14°46′8″E
- Country: Poland
- Voivodeship: West Pomeranian
- County: Myślibórz
- Gmina: Dębno
- Elevation: 47 m (154 ft)
- Population: 290

Barnówko [barˈnufkɔ] (German: Berneuchen) is a village in the administrative district of Gmina Dębno, within Myślibórz County, West Pomeranian Voivodeship, in north-western Poland. It lies approximately 8 km (5 mi) north-east of Dębno, 18 km (11 mi) south of Myślibórz, and 72 km (45 mi) south of the regional capital Szczecin.

The Christian Berneuchen Movement was born in the 1920s in Berneuchen in the New March (Frankfurt Region). The founders, meeting annually on the Berneuchen Manor, worked to give to spiritual life a greater and more perfect concrete form, in order to throw off the influence of liberal theology. In 1926 the circle published the Berneuchener Buch (Berneuchen Book), written by Karl Bernhard Ritter, Wilhelm Stählin, Ludwig Heitmann and Wilhelm Thomas. Today the Berneuchen societies include Berneuchener Dienst, Evangelische Michaelsbruderschaft and Gemeinschaft Sankt Michael, its current centre, the Berneuchen House (Berneuchener Haus) is in the Kirchberg convent.

The village has a population of 290.
