= Leutra =

Leutra may refer to the following places in Germany:

- Jena-Leutra, a village in the city of Jena, Thuringia
- Leutra (Jena), a small river in the central part of Jena, tributary of the Saale
- Leutra (Maua), a small river in the southern part of Jena, tributary of the Saale
