= Naturschutzgebiet Leutratal und Cospoth =

Nature reserve in Germany

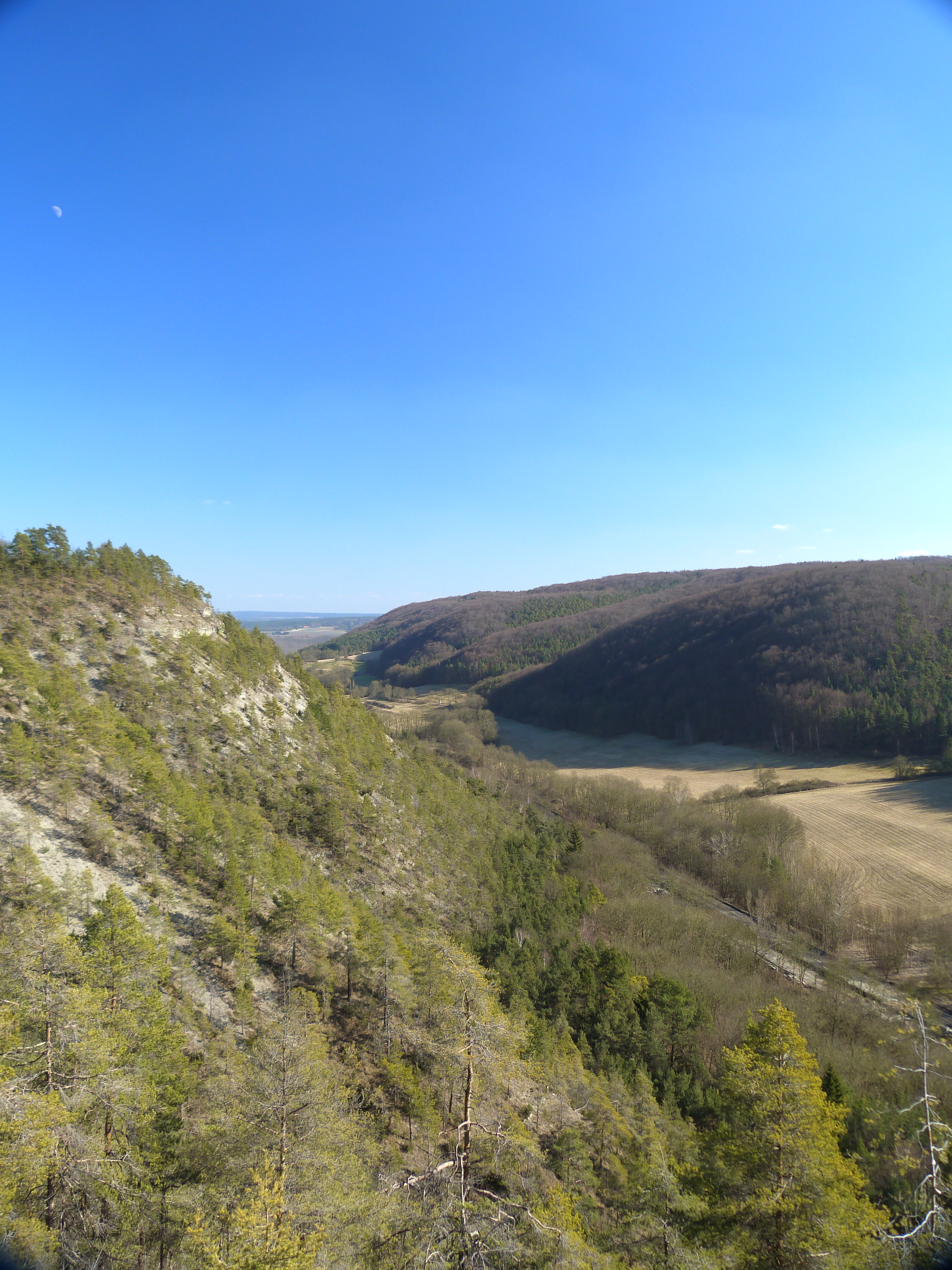
Leutratal in winter 2015, after the removal of the Autobahn

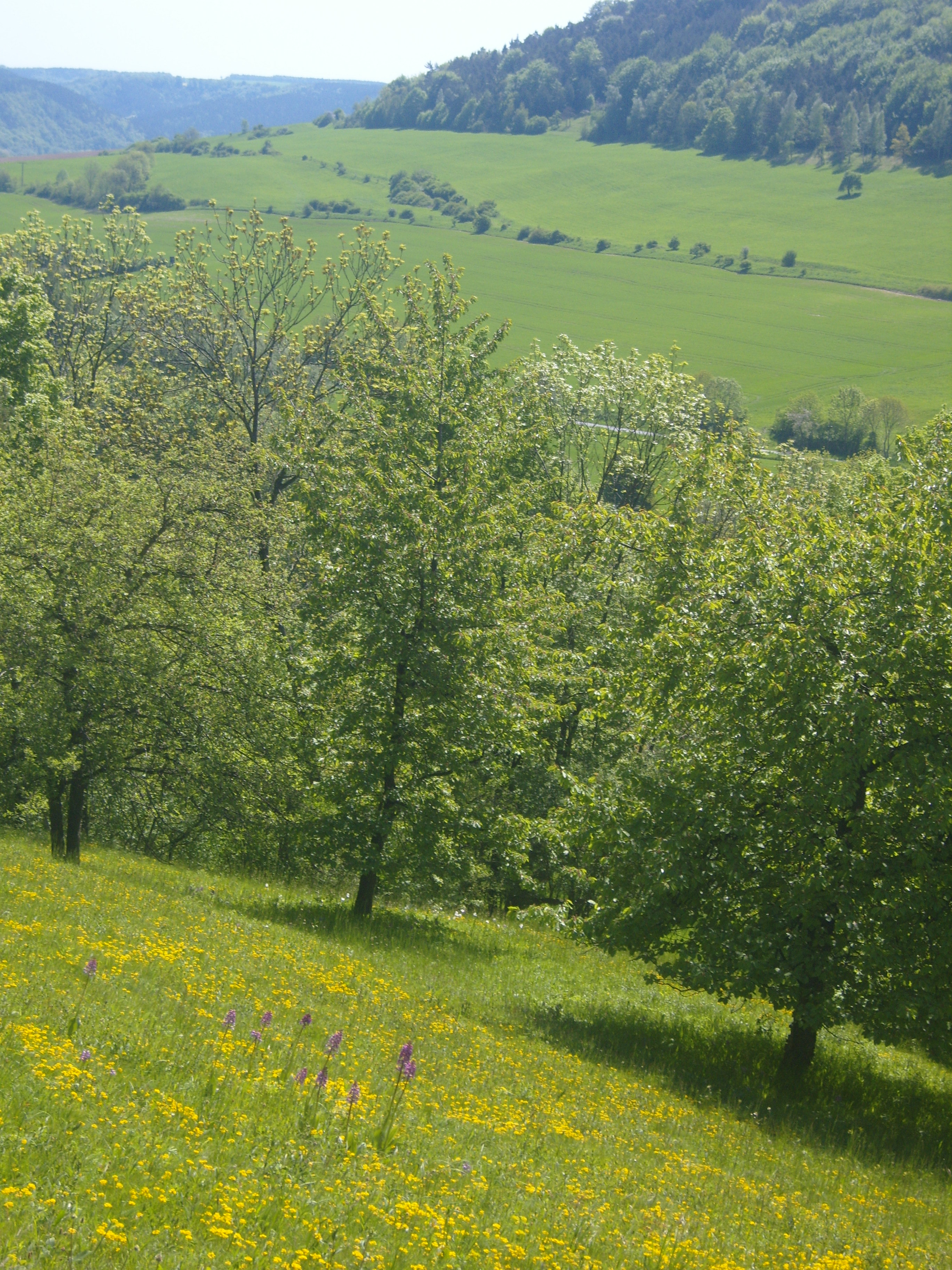
A view across the Leutra valley in summer 2008, two species of orchid visible in the meadow.

NSG Leutratal und Cospoth (often referred to simply as Leutratal) is an important nature reserve in Germany, southwest of the town of Jena. The reserve is maintained by Naturschutzbund Deutschland. The reserve contains the valley of the river Leutra and beech forest. The nature reserve measures 582.9 hectares. The bedrock is Muschelkalk (limestone). In 2018, 23% of the reserve was pine forest and 16% broadleaf trees, 23% was xerothermic meadow, 9% brome semi-dry grassland and 14% agricultural use. Rare tree species growing in the forests and on the slope include wild pear and wild service tree.

A huge variety of wildflowers grow in the valley, including at least 26 species of orchids. Other flowers in the reserve include Carthusian pink, purple gromwell and liquorice milk-vetch.

In 2007 the protected area was expanded by 441.4 hectares from its initial size of 141.5 hectares. During the Nazi era a motorway (the A4) was built through the valley, however Angela Merkel's government had a 3 kilometre road tunnel built in 2014 (Jagdbergtunnel) to expand capacity of the Autobahn while reducing the impact of the road on the nature reserve.

The results of this work have so far been mixed. The burial of the Autobahn led to invasive non-native plant species including Bunias orientalis (Turkish rocket) colonising the bare ground, which it is feared threaten to displace native wildflowers, however it has also already been observed that more bats (including Rhinolophus hipposideros) are visiting the valley.

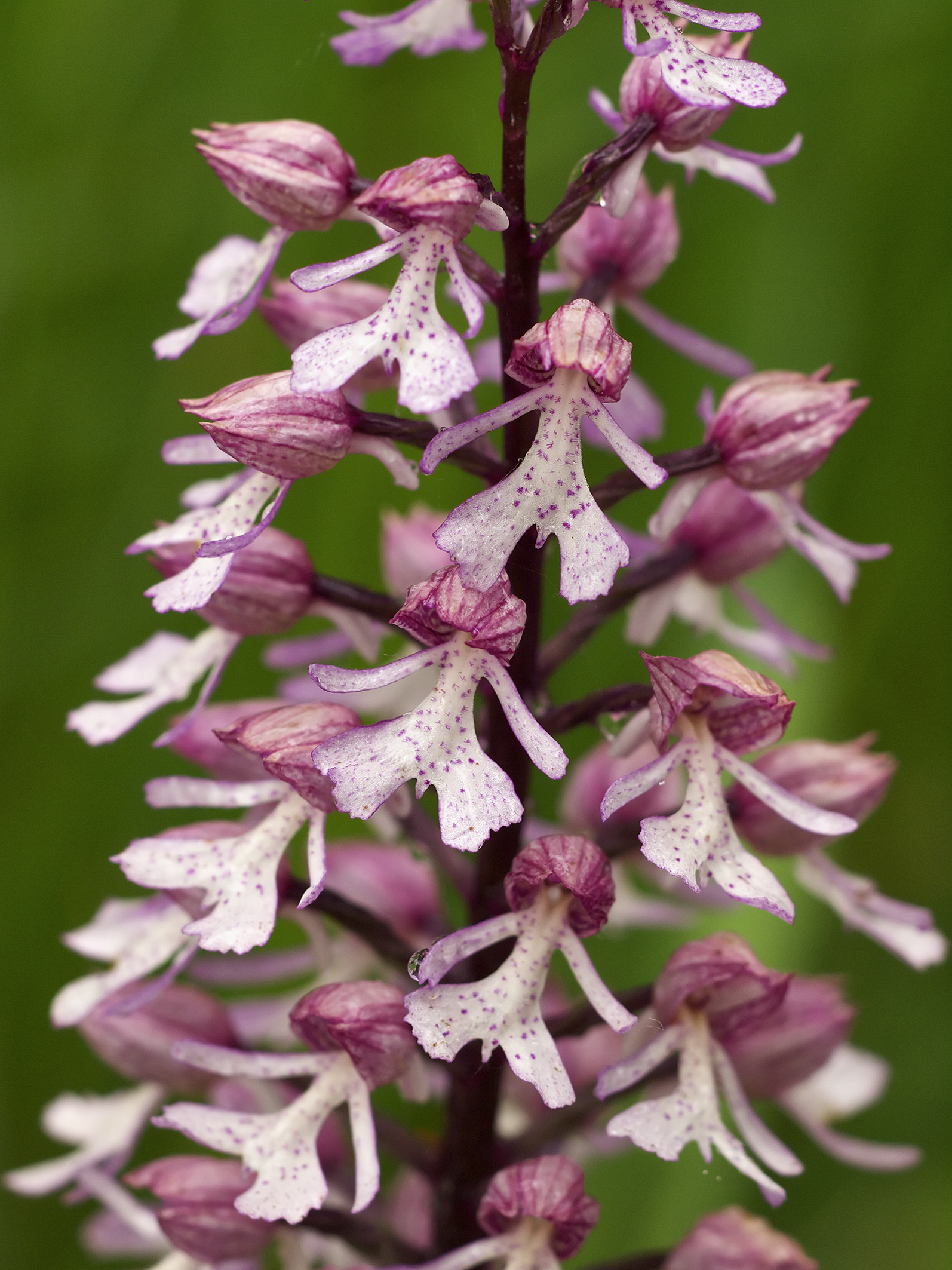
Orchis militarisxpurpurea natural hybrid, photographed in the reserve in 2014

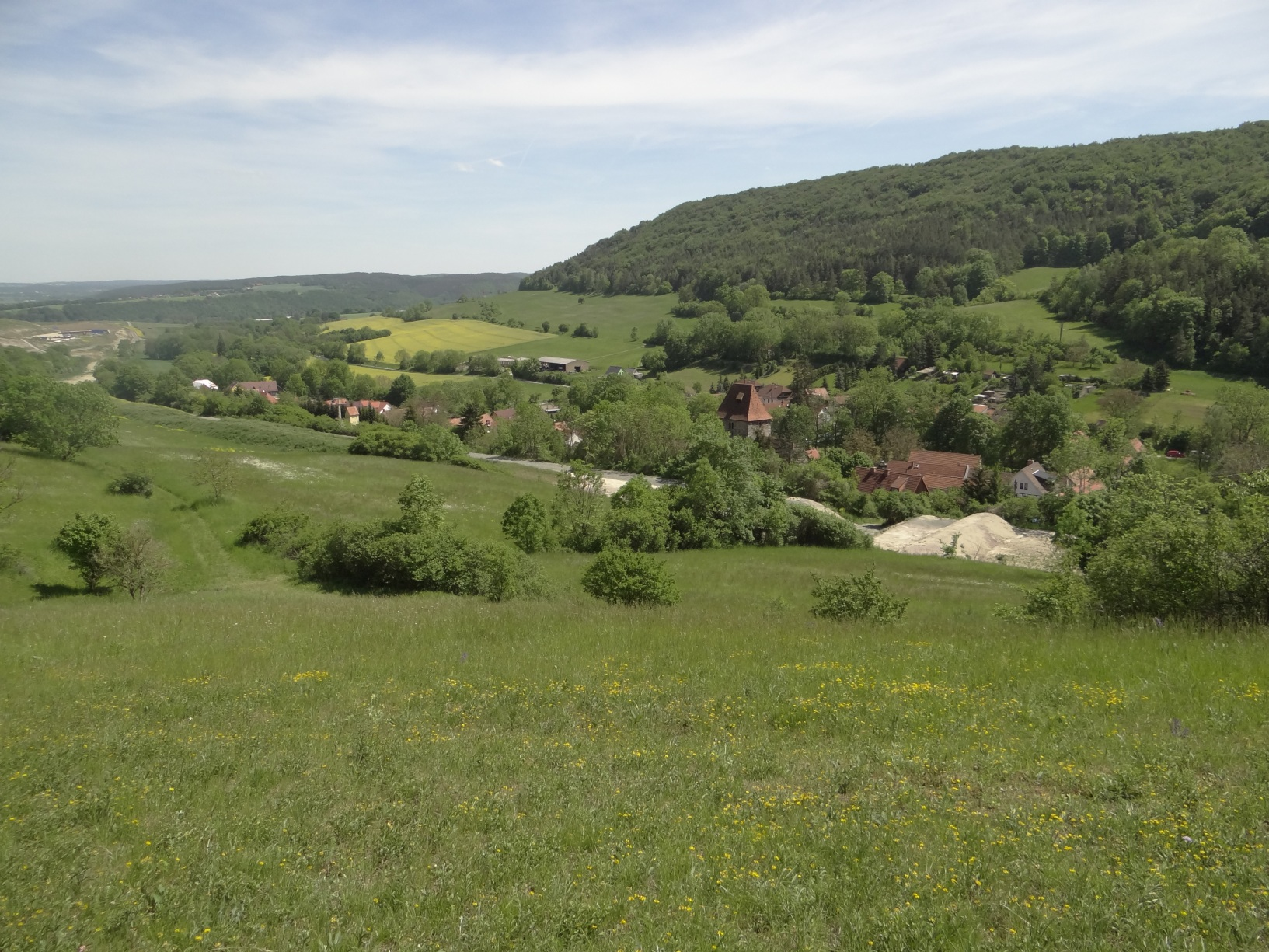
Leutratal in 2016, looking towards Leutra

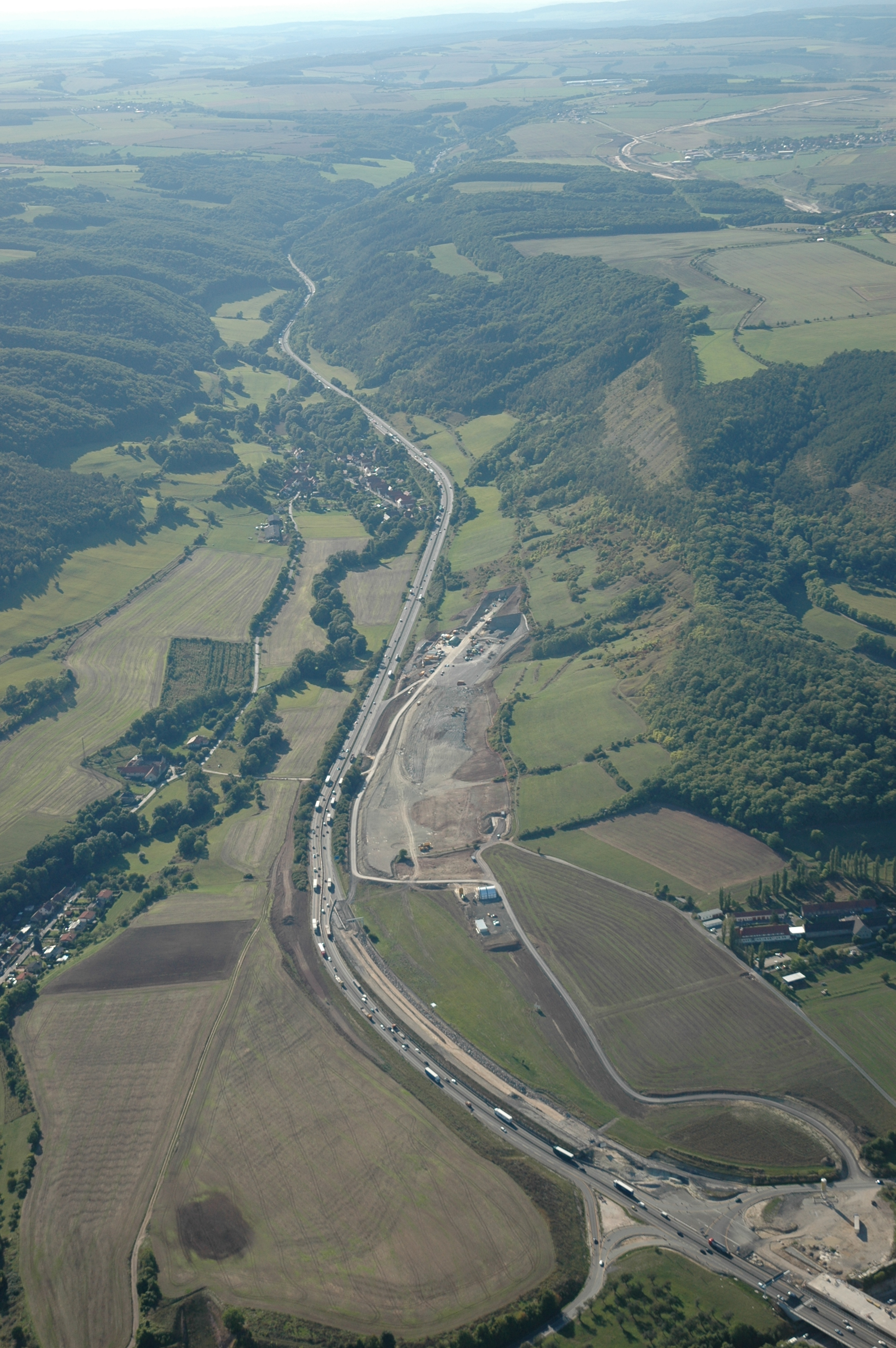
An aerial view of the Leutra valley in 2008, after the expansion of the nature reserve, but before the Autobahn was removed.
