= Leutra (Maua) =

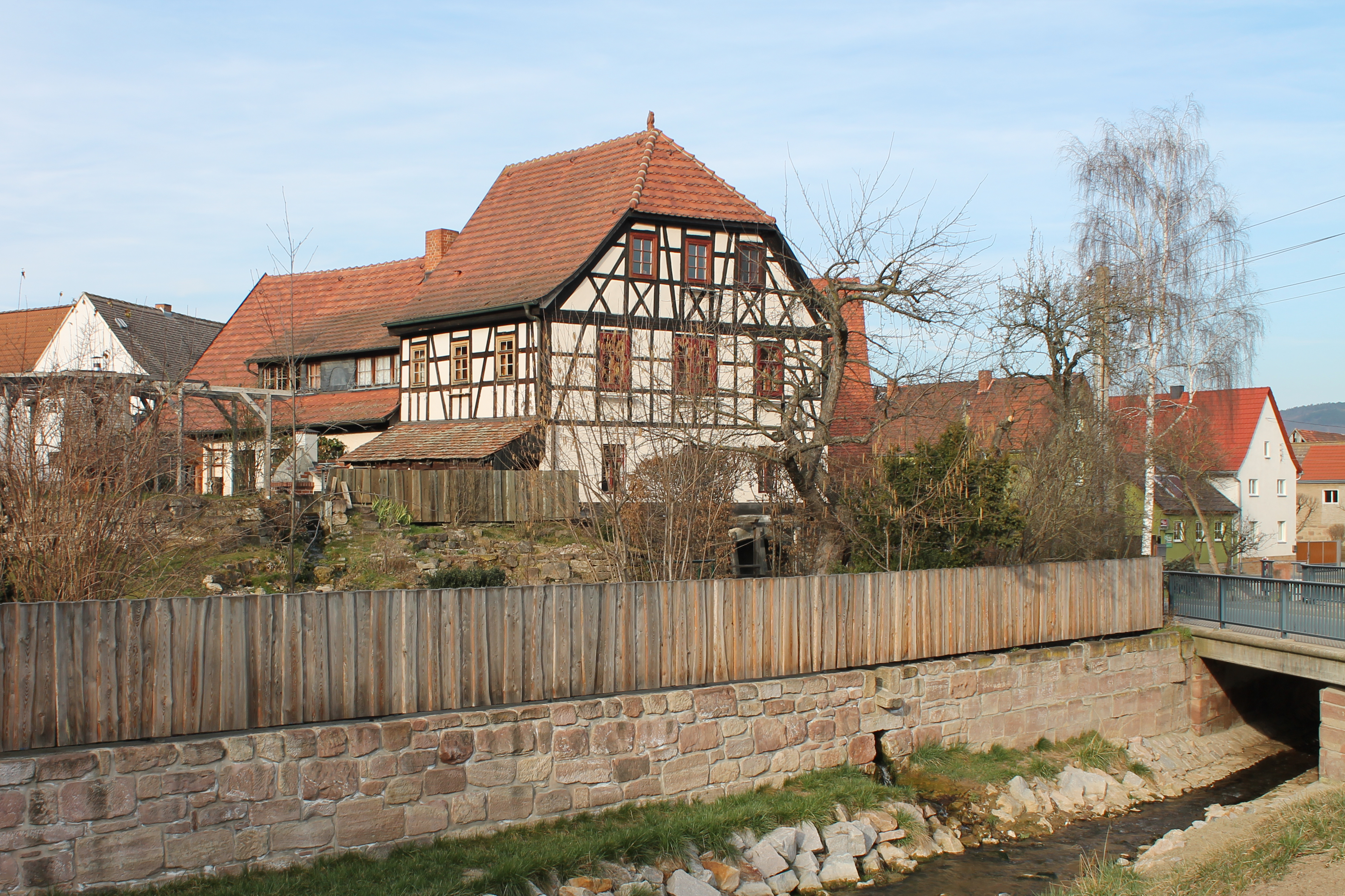

Location
- Country: Germany
- State: Thuringia

Physical characteristics
- Source
  - coordinates: 50°51′20″N 11°27′06″E
- Mouth
  - location: Saale
  - coordinates: 50°52′8″N 11°36′01″E

Basin features
- Progression: Saale→ Elbe→ North Sea

Leutra is a small river in Thuringia, Germany. It flows into the Saale in the village Maua, in the southern part of Jena. Another small river also named Leutra flows into the Saale in the centre of Jena, 6 km to the north.

The valley through which the Leutra flows is part of an important nature reserve, called Naturschutzgebiet Leutratal und Cospoth, maintained by Naturschutzbund Deutschland.

During the Nazi era a motorway (the A4) was built through the valley, but Angela Merkel's government had a road tunnel built (Jagdbergtunnel) to increase the capacity of the Autobahn while reducing the impact of the road on the nature reserve.

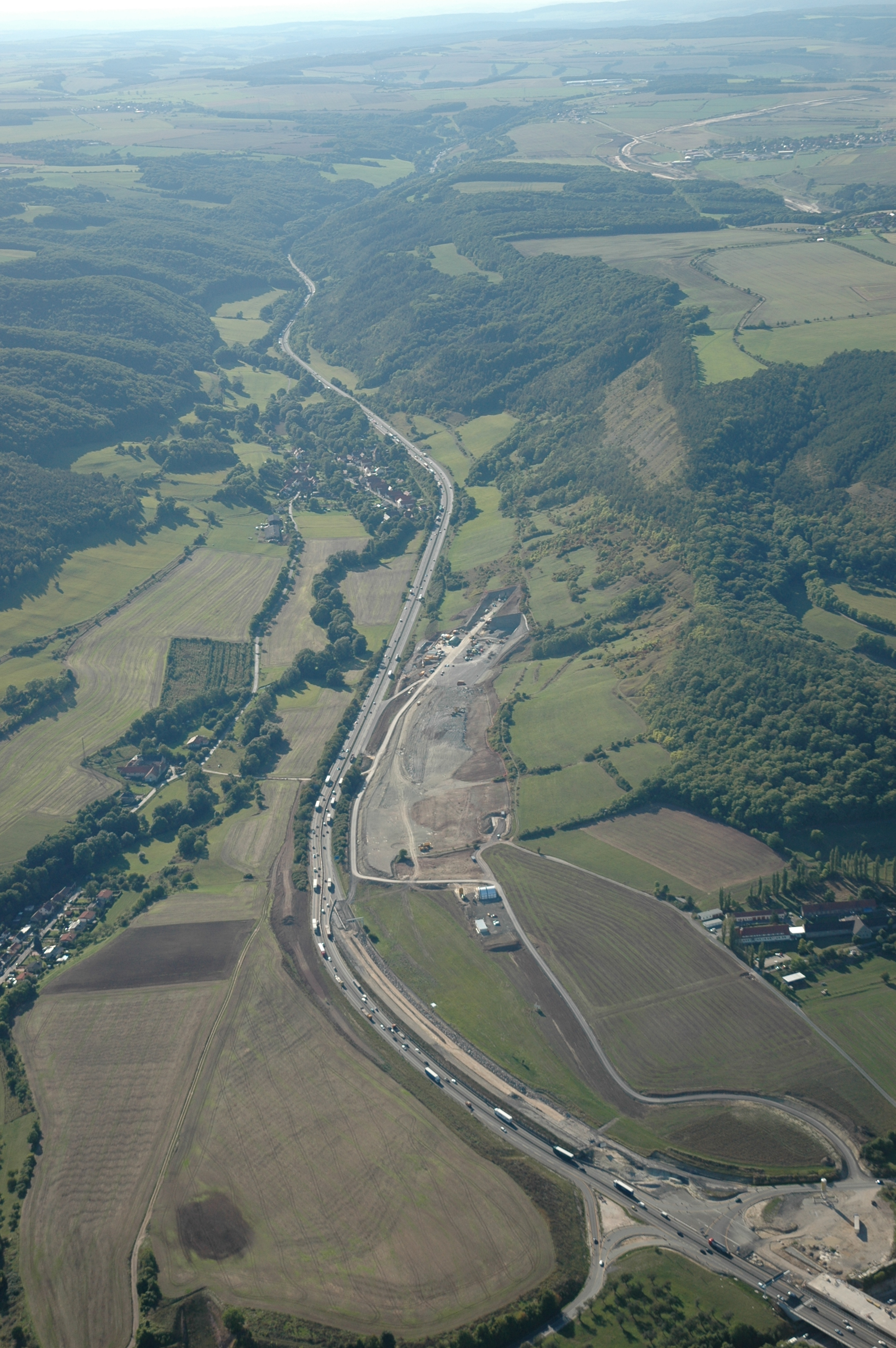
An aerial view of the Leutra valley in 2008, after the expansion of the nature reserve, but before the Autobahn was removed.

== See also ==
- List of rivers of Thuringia
