= Lina Hähnle =

Pioneer of bird conservation in Germany

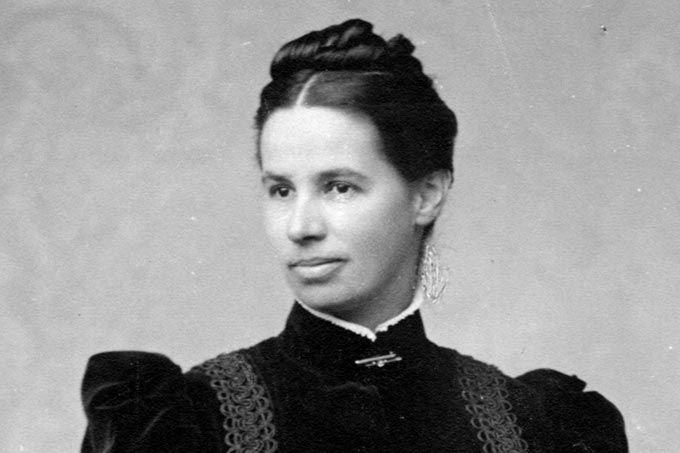
Lina Hähnle

Emilie Karoline "Lina" Hähnle (3 February 1851 – 1 February 1941) was a German pioneer of bird conservation. She founded the Swabian league for bird protection in Germany which would later merge into what became the Naturschutzbund Deutschland (NABU). Her son Hermann Hähnle made films on birds and also worked on bird conservation.

== Early life and career ==
Hähnle was born in Sulz am Neckar. Her father Johannes Hähnle was a salt works inspector. The family moved to Rottweil, Schwäbisch Hall and then Tübingen. She married her cousin Hans Hähnle who ran a factory in Giengen an der Brenz. She volunteered as the chairperson of the newly formed bird protection union Bund für Vogelschutz (BfV) in 1899 which was based on the system followed in Austria. She helped popularize bird conservation through lectures and other efforts. One of the supporters of the organization was Robert Bosch of Albeck, not far from Giengen. They were also supported by Protestant theologians from Tübingen. By 1899 the organization had 3,500 members in Württemberg alone. This would later become a much bigger organization, the Naturschutzbund Deutschland.
