= Wilhelm Stählin =

German Lutheran theologian (1883–1975)

Wilhelm Stählin (24 September 1883, Gunzenhausen, Bavaria – 16 December 1975, Prien am Chiemsee, Bavaria) was a German Lutheran theologian, bishop and preacher. He was one of the major initiators of the Liturgical Movement in German Protestantism in the 20th Century.

== Life ==
=== Early life ===
After completing his school education in Augsburg Stählin began studying theology in 1901 in Erlangen, Rostock and Berlin. In 1905 he completed this theological examinations and served afterwards as a vicar in Bavaria. After a trip to England in 1908 Stählin became a parish pastor in Egloffstein and married. In 1913 he received his doctorate at the University of Marburg. His dissertation dealt with the problem of biblical metaphors. In 1914 he founded the "Gesellschaft für Religionspsychologie" (The Society for Religious Psychology) and published the "Archive for Religious Psychology". At the same time he established contact with the German Youth Movement of that time.

=== WWI and WWII ===
He was a voluntary military chaplain in the German army from 1914 until 1916. In 1917 he became a parish pastor in Nürnberg. After World War I he intensified his contact to the German youth movement. In 1923 he was one of the initiators of the Berneuchen Movement and in 1931 of the affiliated St. Michael's Brotherhood. This movement saw its goal in a liturgical renewal of Protestantism. In 1926 Stählin became a professor for practical theology at the Westphalian Wilhelms-Universität in Münster.

After 1933 he became an active member of the Confessing Church; he withdrew his membership from this movement in 1941.

=== Later life ===
Having become a widower in 1945 he remarried in 1946.

From 1945 until 1952 he served as the bishop of the Evangelical Lutheran Church of Oldenburg. Since 1946 he was active in the Lutheran Liturgical Conference.

In 1946 Stählin and Lorenz Cardinal Jaeger co-founded an ecumenical study group of Catholic and Lutheran theologians called the "Jaeger-Stählin-Circle". He was the Lutheran head of this group from 1946 until 1970. Until this very day this group furthers the ecumenical discussion between Catholics and Lutherans.

Stählin retired in 1952; however, he continued to hold lectures for many years at the University of Münster. In 1968 he published his autobiography, Via Vitae.

As an exponent of liturgical renewal and as the author of sermon aids Stählin continues to influence a large number of German theologians to the present day.

== Family ==
Stählin was the son of a Christian preacher and missionary.

Stählin was married twice; first to Emmy Thäter, who died in 1945, and then to Liselotte Künne. He and Emmy had several children.

== Publications ==
His publications include;

- "Lay Work in English Congregations," 1913
- "The New Lifestyle," 1919
- "Fever and Healing in the Youth Movement," 1922
- "Fate and Meaning of German Youth," 1926
