= Gustav Bauernfeind =

German artist

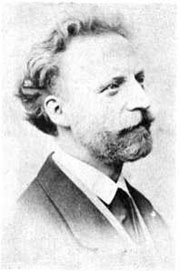
- Gustav Bauernfeind
- Born: 4 September 1848; Sulz am Neckar, Kingdom of Württemberg
- Died: 24 December 1904 (aged 56); Jerusalem, Ottoman Empire
- Resting place: Templer Cemetery in the German Colony, Jerusalem
- Education: Polytechnic Institute, Stuttgart,
- Movement: Orientalist

Gustav Bauernfeind (German: [ˈɡʊstaf ˈbaʊɐnfaɪnt]; 4 September 1848 – 24 December 1904) was a German painter, illustrator, and architect. He is considered to be one of the most notable Orientalist painters of Germany.

== Education and early career ==
Bauernfeind was born in Sulz am Neckar. His father was a pharmacist who converted to Catholicism from Judaism. After completing his architectural studies at the Polytechnic Institute in Stuttgart, he was in the architectural firm of Professor Wilhelm Bäumer and later in that of Adolph Gnauth, where he also learned painting. In his earlier paintings, Bauernfeind focused on local views of Germany, as well as motifs from Italy.

== Painting the Levant ==
During his journey to the Levant from 1880 to 1882, he became interested in the Orient and repeated his travels again and again. In 1896 he moved with his wife and son to Ottoman Palestine and subsequently settled in Jerusalem in 1898. He also lived and worked in Lebanon and Syria.

His work is characterized primarily by architectural views of Jerusalem and the Holy Land. The oil paintings of Bauernfeind are mostly meticulously crafted, intricately composed and almost photographically accurate cityscapes and images of known edifices. In addition, he produced landscape scenes and watercolours.

Bauernfeind had a heart defect that resulted in poor health and eventually death by heart attack at age 56, in Jerusalem. His wife, Elise, died three years later.

== Reception ==
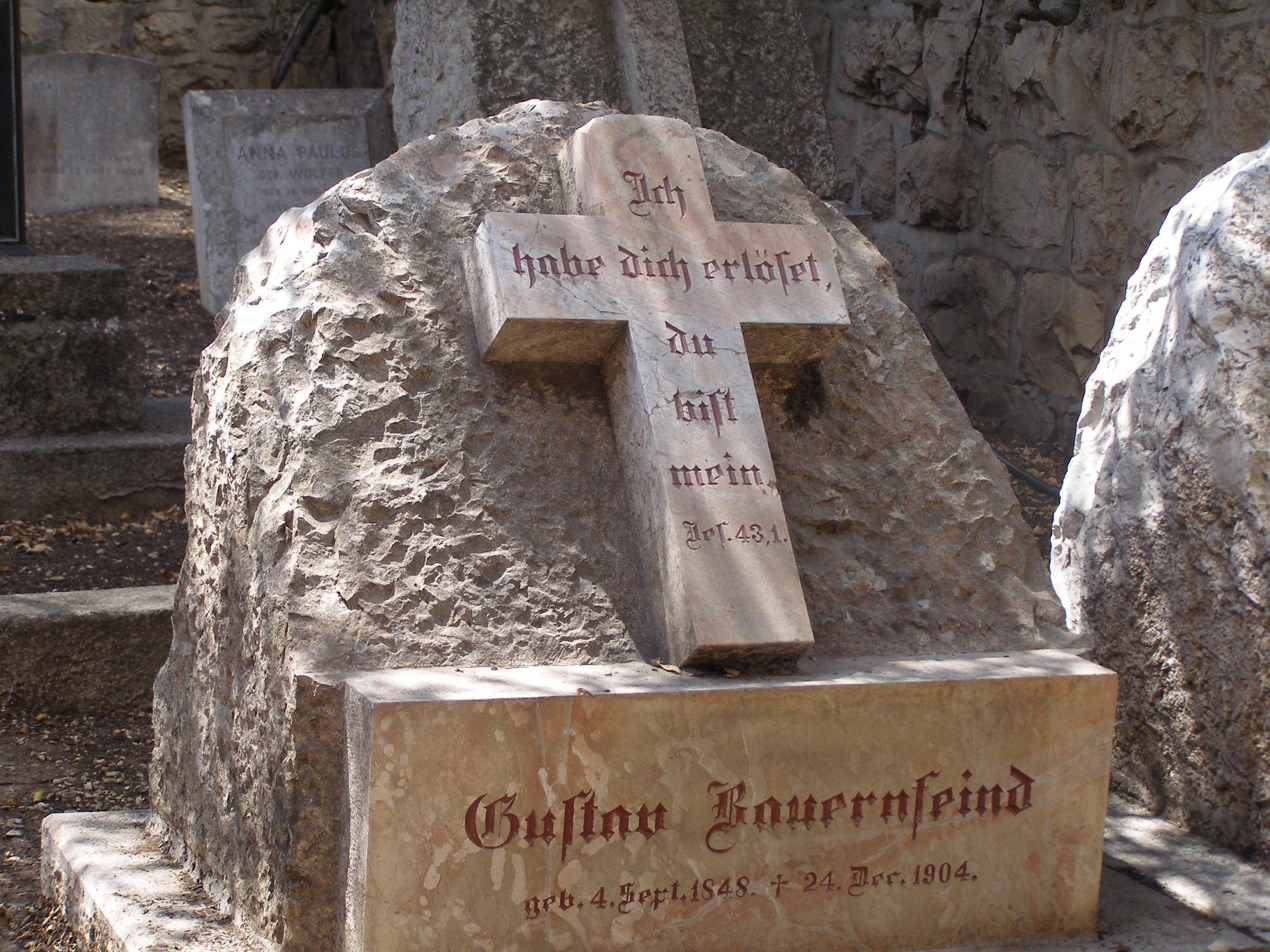
Gustav Bauernfeind's grave in the Templer Cemetery in the German Colony, Jerusalem

During his lifetime he was the most popular Orientalist painter of Germany, but would fade into irrelevance after his death. However, since the early 1980s, Bauernfeind was gradually rediscovered, with his paintings appearing at auctions with high prices. Thus, his oil painting The Wailing Wall was sold at Christie's in London for the equivalent of €326,000 in 1992. The same painting would reach at Sotheby's in London the equivalent of €4.5 million in a later auction in 2007. In 1997, another oil painting of Bauernfeind, The Port of Jaffa, was sold at the Van Ham Kunstauktionen in Cologne for 1,510,000 DM, thus becoming the most expensive 19th-century painting ever sold in Germany.

== Legacy ==
At his birthplace in Sulz am Neckar, the life and work of the painter is commemorated by the Gustav Bauernfeind Museum with a large permanent exhibition.

== Work ==
=== Gallery ===
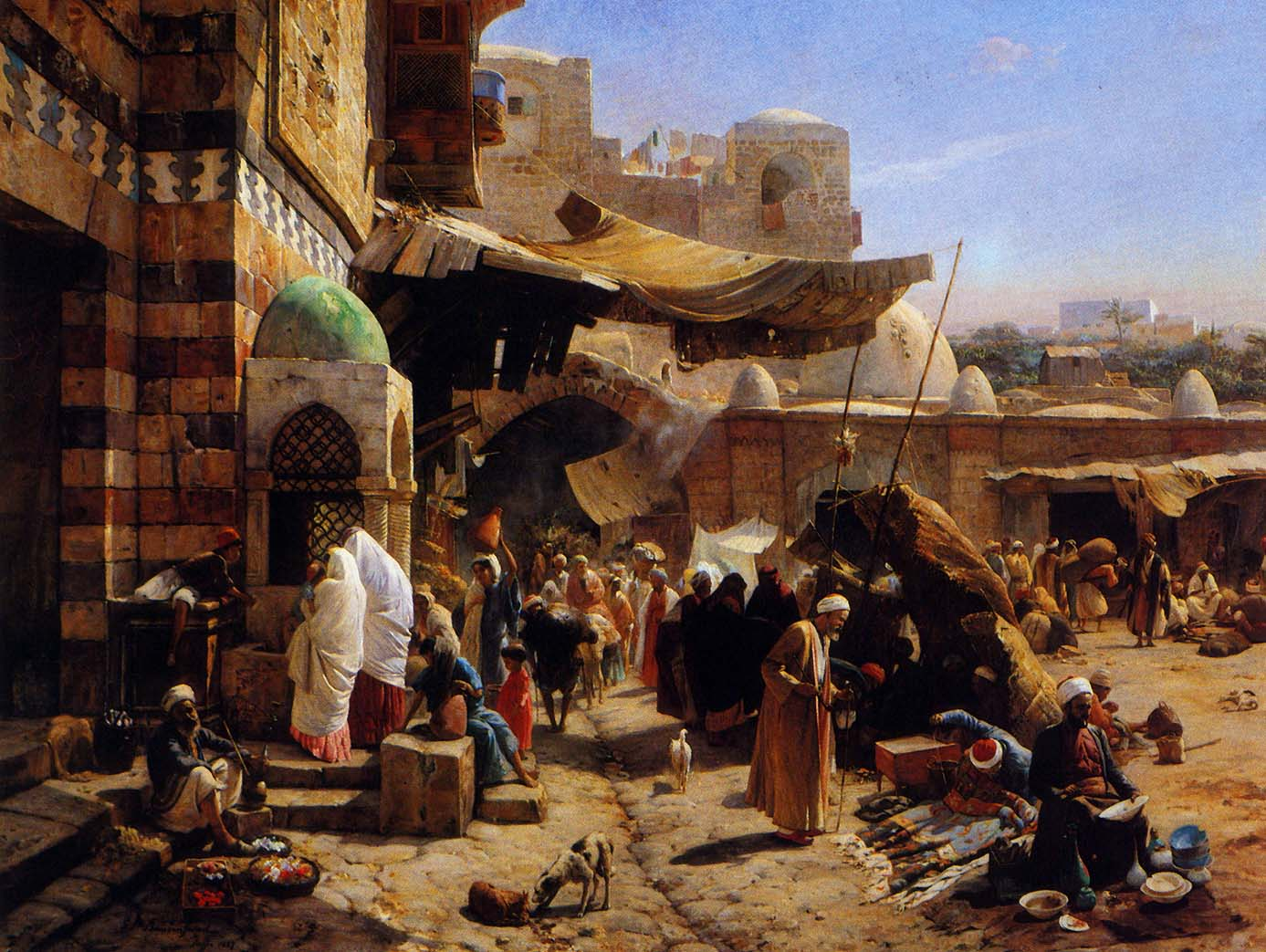
Market at Jaffa, 1877.

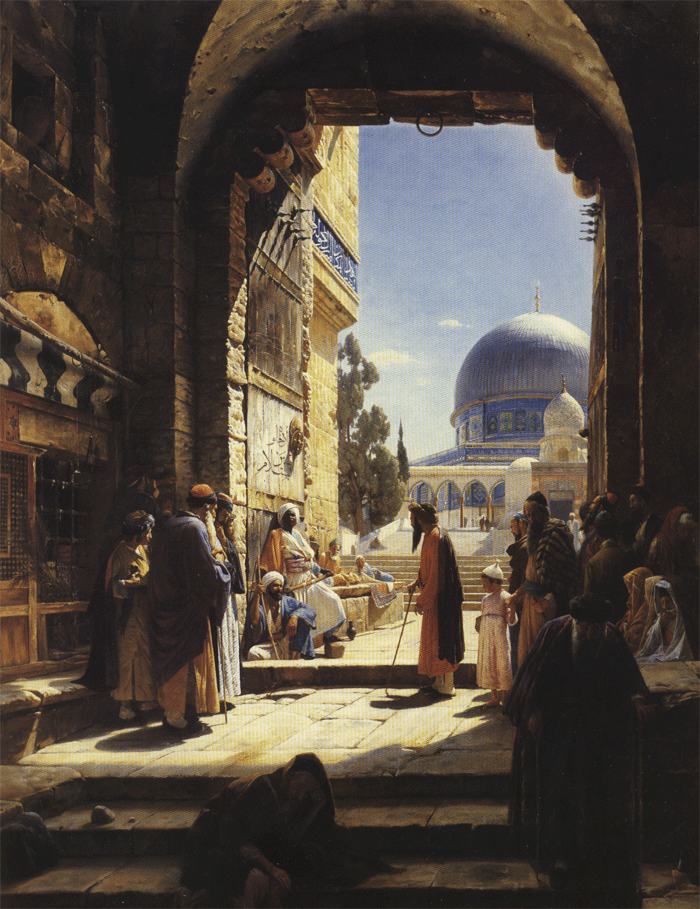
At the Entrance to the Temple Mount, Jerusalem, 1886.

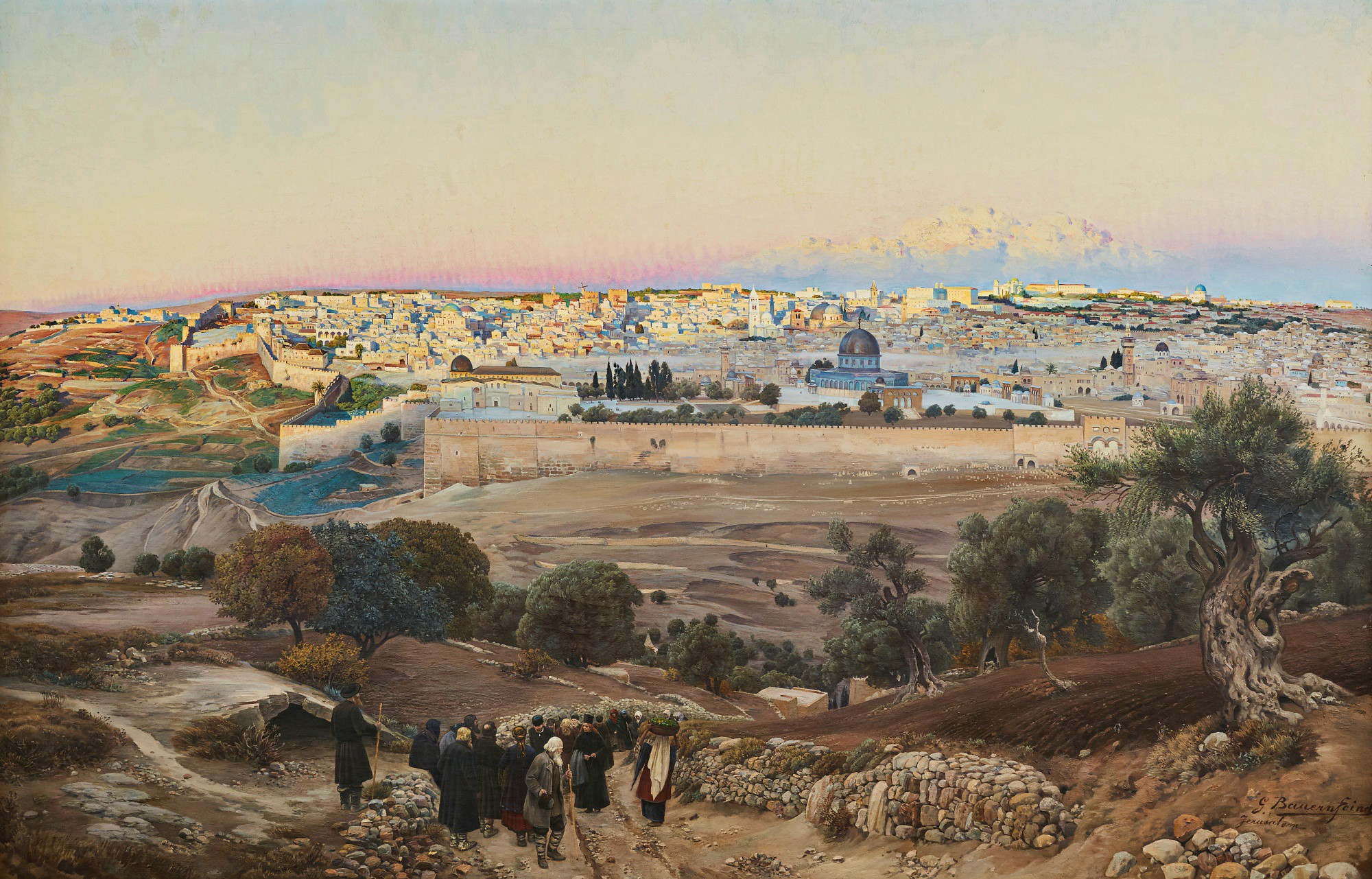
Jerusalem from the Mount of Olives at Sunrise (circa 1902)

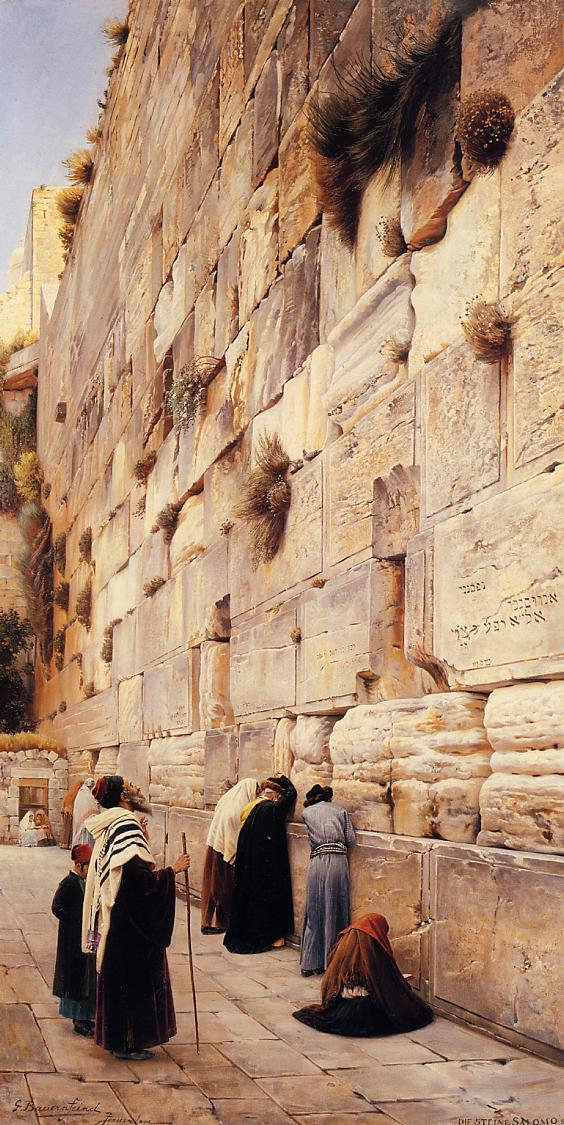
The Wailing Wall, 1904.

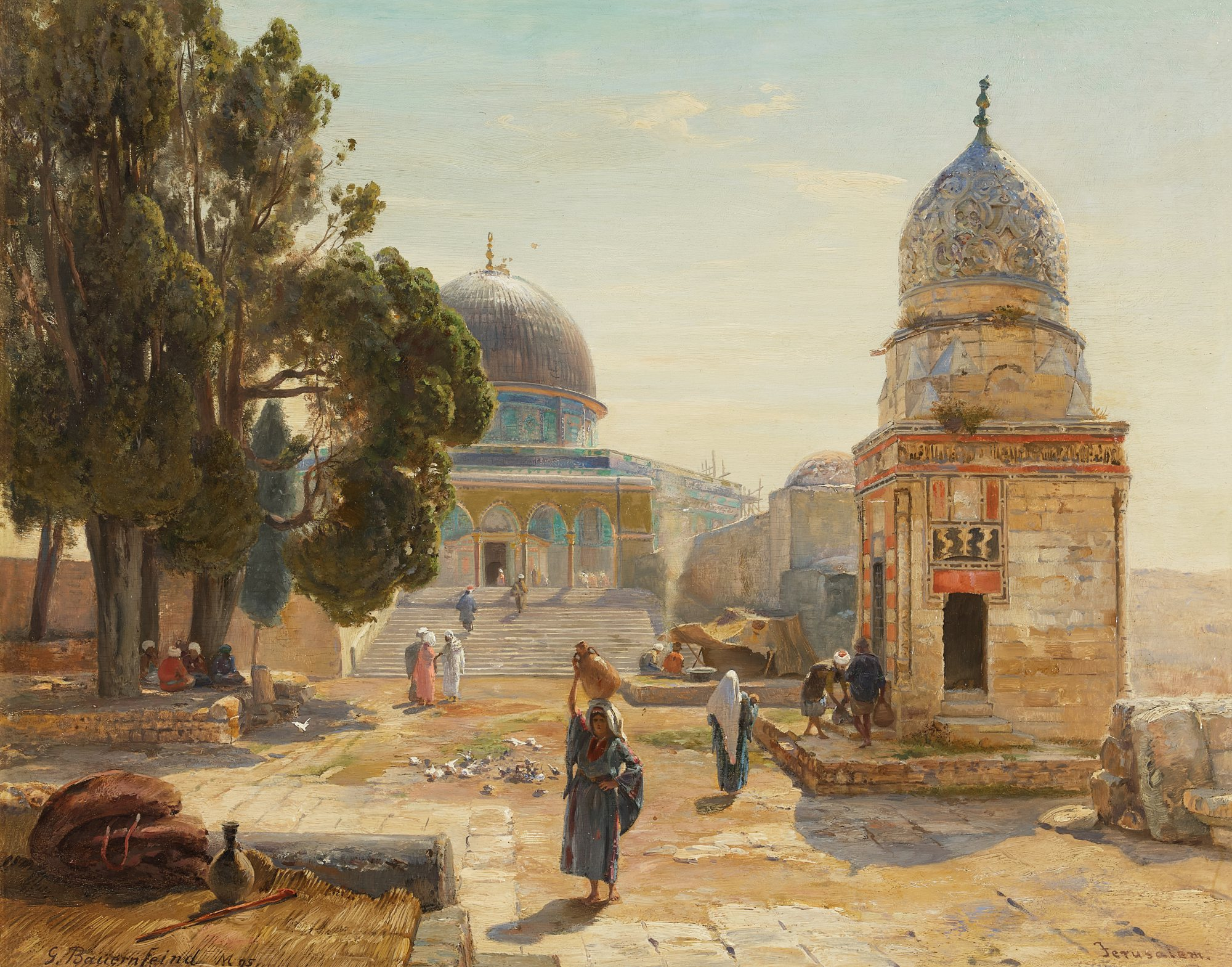
At the Dome of the Rock and the Fountain of Qayt Bay, Jerusalem (late 19th Century)

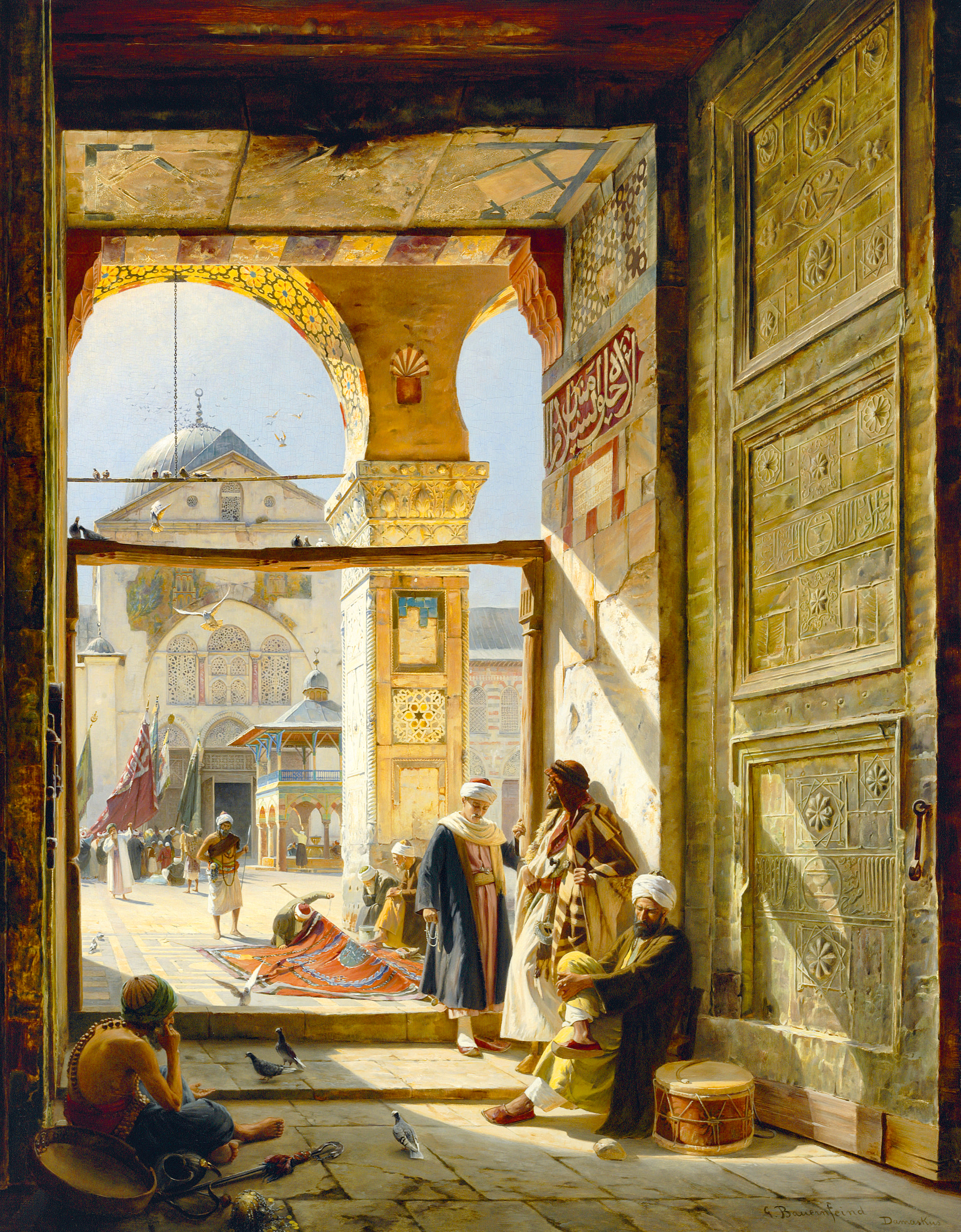
The Gate Of The Great Umayyad Mosque, Damascus, 1890

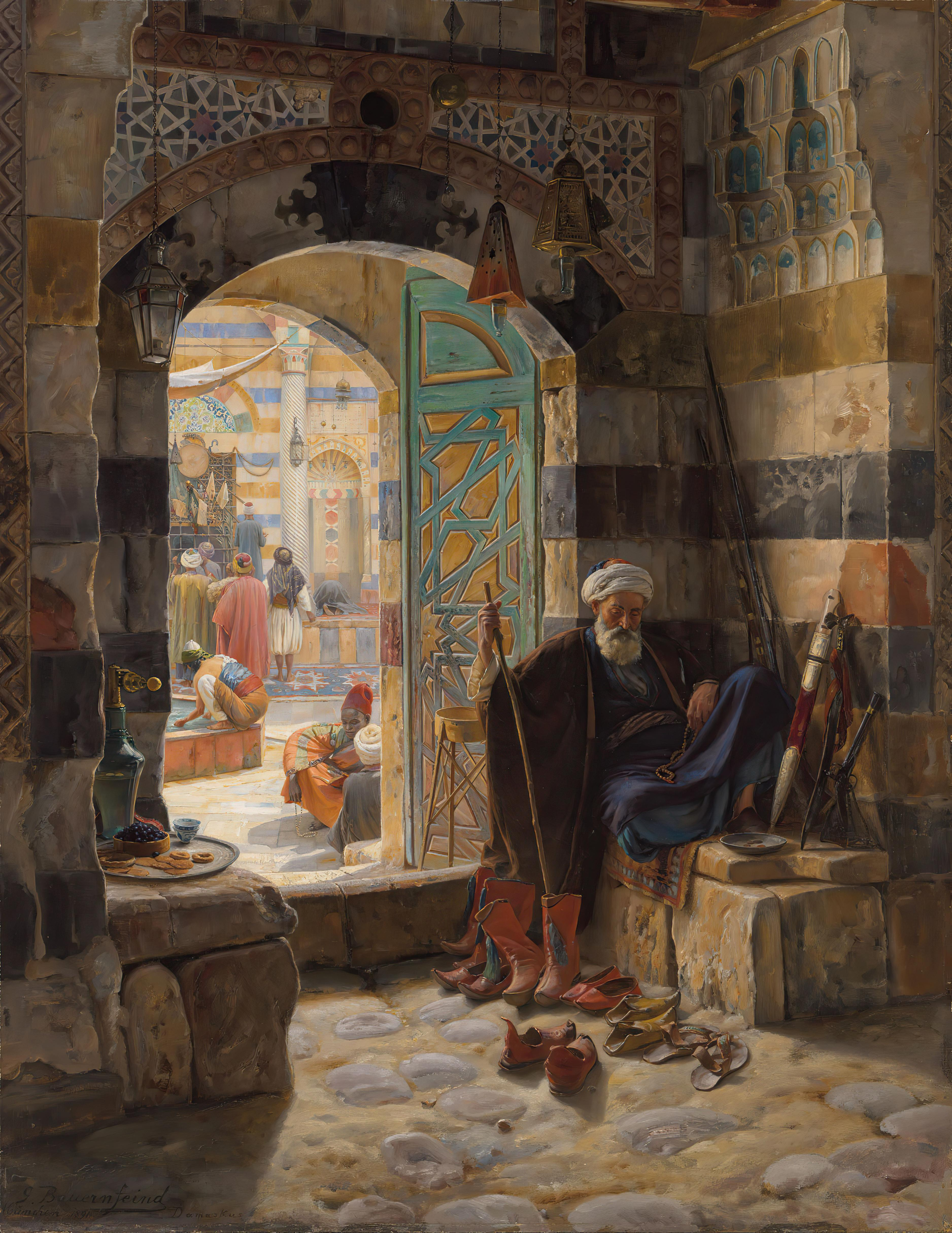
Warden of the Mosque, Damascus, 1891.

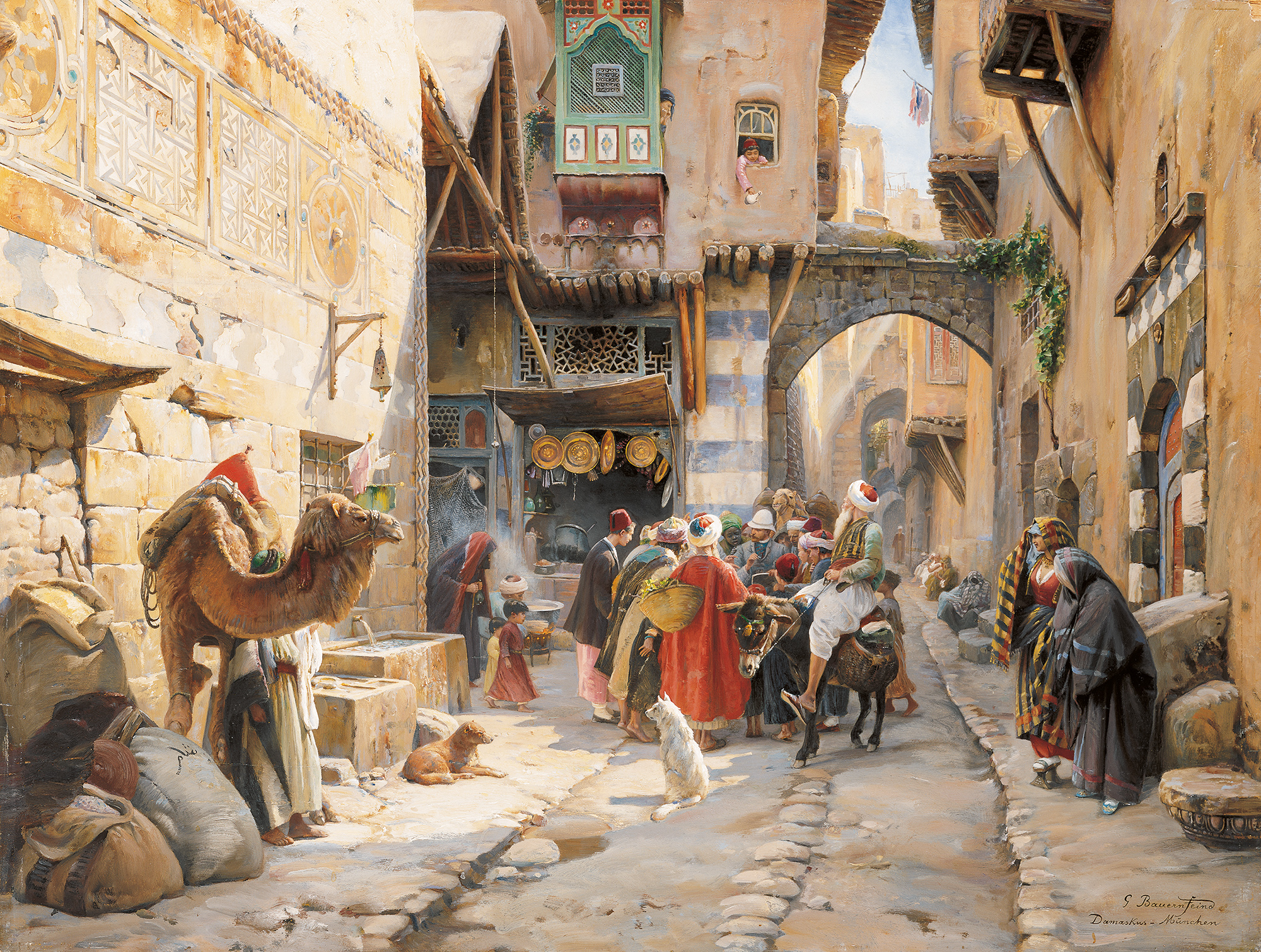
A Street Scene, Damascus (late 19th Century)

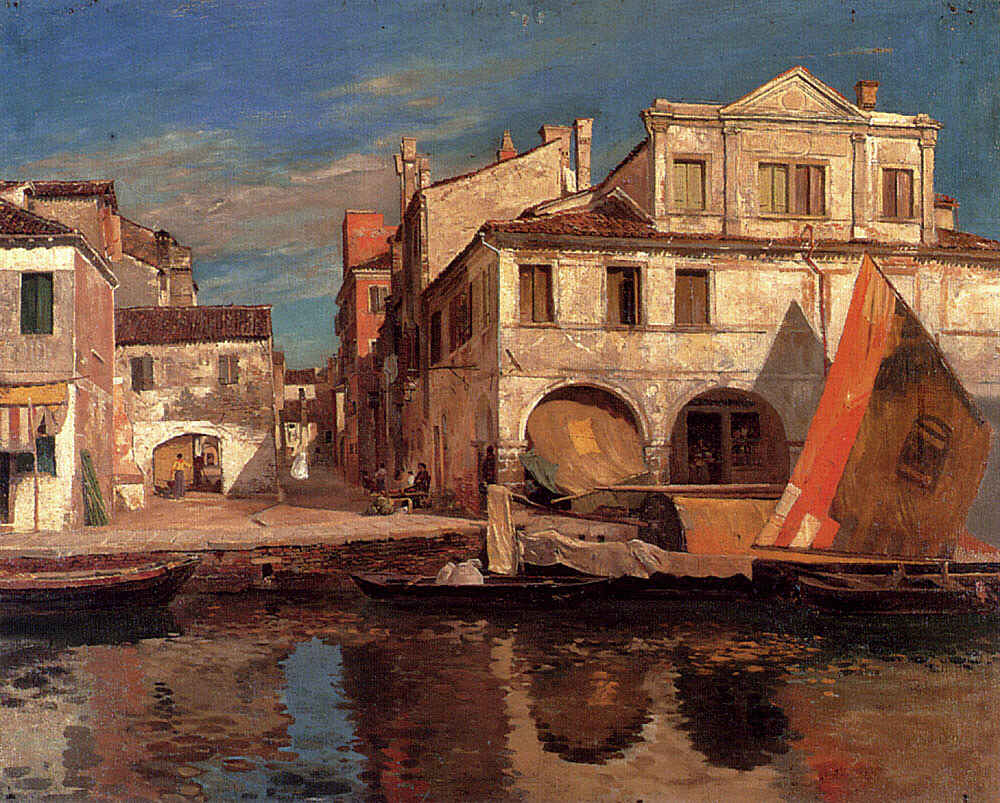
Canal Scene in Chioggia

=== Select list of paintings ===
- Castel Gandolfo am Albaner See, 1864 (Drawing)
- Markt in Jaffa, 1877 (Oil painting)
- Der Hafen von Jaffa, 1888 (Oil painting)
- Straßenszene in Damaskus, um 1887 (Oil painting, 51 × 68 cm)
- Jaffa, Einziehung der türkischen Landwehr in Palästina, 1888 (Oil painting)
- Die Klagemauer, Jerusalem, 1890 (Oil painting, 130 × 101 cm)
- Straße in Jerusalem (Oil painting, 109 × 82 cm)
- Ansicht der deutschen Kolonie in Haifa, 1898 (Oil painting)
- Jerusalem, Blick von unten auf den Felsendom (Oil painting, 109 × 82 cm)
- Eingang zum Tempelberg, Jerusalem (Oil painting, 102 × 70 cm)
- Forecourt of the Umayyad Mosque, Damascus (Oil painting on panel, 47 ¼ x 36 ¼ in. (120.8 x 92.2 cm.) Painted in 1890.)

=== Books ===
- Die Reise nach Damaskus. 1888/89. Tagebuchaufzeichnungen des Orientmalers, herausgegeben von Hugo Schmid unter Mitarbeit von Otto Höschle, Tübingen und Basel 1996 (ISBN 3-7720-2163-8)

== Bibliography ==
- Hugo Schmid: Der Maler Gustav Bauernfeind (1848–1904) und der Orient. Mit einer Einführung von Petra S. Versteegh-Kühner. Hauswedell, Stuttgart 2004, 208 (XX) S., ISBN 3-7762-0904-6
- Hugo Schmid: Der Maler Gustav Bauernfeind. 1848–1904. H. Schmid, Sulz 1980, 149 S.
- Alex Carmel, Hugo Schmid (Bearb.), Gustav Bauernfeind (Ill.): Der Orientmaler Gustav Bauernfeind. 1848–1904. Leben und Werk/The life and work of Gustav Bauernfeind, orientalist painter. Herausgegeben in Zusammenarbeit mit dem Gottlieb-Schumacher-Institut zur Erforschung des Christlichen Beitrages zum Wiederaufbau Palästinas im 19. Jahrhundert an der Universität Haifa, Israel. Hauswedell, Stuttgart 1990, 360 (XII) S., ISBN 3-7762-0319-6
- Petra S. Kühner: Gustav Bauernfeind. Gemälde und Aquarelle. Monographien zur bildenden Kunst, Band 5. (Dissertationsschrift.) Lang, Frankfurt am Main, Berlin, Bern, New York, Paris und Wien 1996, 315 (X) S., ISBN 3-631-49793-8
- Hugo Schmid, Otto Höschle (Bearb.), Gustav Bauernfeind (Autor): Die Reise nach Damaskus 1888/1889. Tagebuchaufzeichnungen des Orientmalers. Francke, Tübingen 1996, 135 Seiten. ISBN 978-3772021633.
- Hugo Schmid: Der Orientmaler Gustav Bauernfeind in Italien. Geiger, Horb 2008, 128 Seiten. ISBN 978-3865952431.

== See also ==
- List of German painters
- List of Orientalist artists
- Orientalism
