= Carl Reinhold August Wunderlich =

German physician and psychiatrist

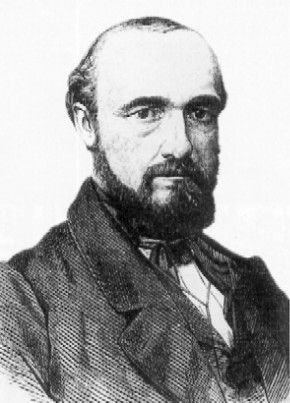
Portrait

Carl Reinhold August Wunderlich (4 August 1815, Sulz am Neckar – 25 September 1877, Leipzig) was a German medical doctor, pioneer psychiatrist, and medical professor. He is known for his measurement of mean normal human body temperature of 37 °C (98.6 °F), now known more accurately to be about 36.8 °C (98.2 °F).

== Life and career ==
He attended grammar school in Stuttgart and at the age of eighteen he began his medical studies at University of Tübingen, where he completed his final exams in 1837. In 1838 he worked as assistant at St Catharine's Hospital in Stuttgart, and wrote his MD thesis. Two years later he wrote his MD habilitation on internal medicine at University of Tübingen.

In 1846, he was appointed Professor (ordentlicher Professor) and head of the general hospital at Tübingen. He moved to Leipzig University as Professor and Medical Director of the university hospital four years later. There he introduced clinical pedagogy, combined with a rigorous methodology of diagnosis, and empirical observation of patients. He introduced temperature charts into hospitals, holding that fever is not a disease, but a symptom. The thermometer he used was reportedly a foot long, and required 20 minutes to register the temperature.

He was known for his lectures on psychiatry and on the "pathology and therapy of illnesses of the nervous system." He described an extremely rare eponymous syndrome that consists of retroperitoneal bleeding from the kidney, which tracks into the surrounding tissues. This may be due to benign or malignant disease. In 1871, he was appointed to the Department of Medicine's organisational commission for the construction and design of psychiatric hospitals.

== Publications ==
- Wunderlich, Carl Reinhold August (1856). Handbuch der Pathologie und Therapie. Stuttgart: Ebner & Seubert.
- Wunderlich, Carl Reinhold August (1868). Das Verhalten der Eigenwärme in Krankheiten [The behavior of the self-warmth in diseases]. Leipzig: O. Wigand.; its 2nd edition translated into English and published with the title On the temperature in diseases: a manual of medical thermometry (1871).
