= Sulz am Neckar =

- Town
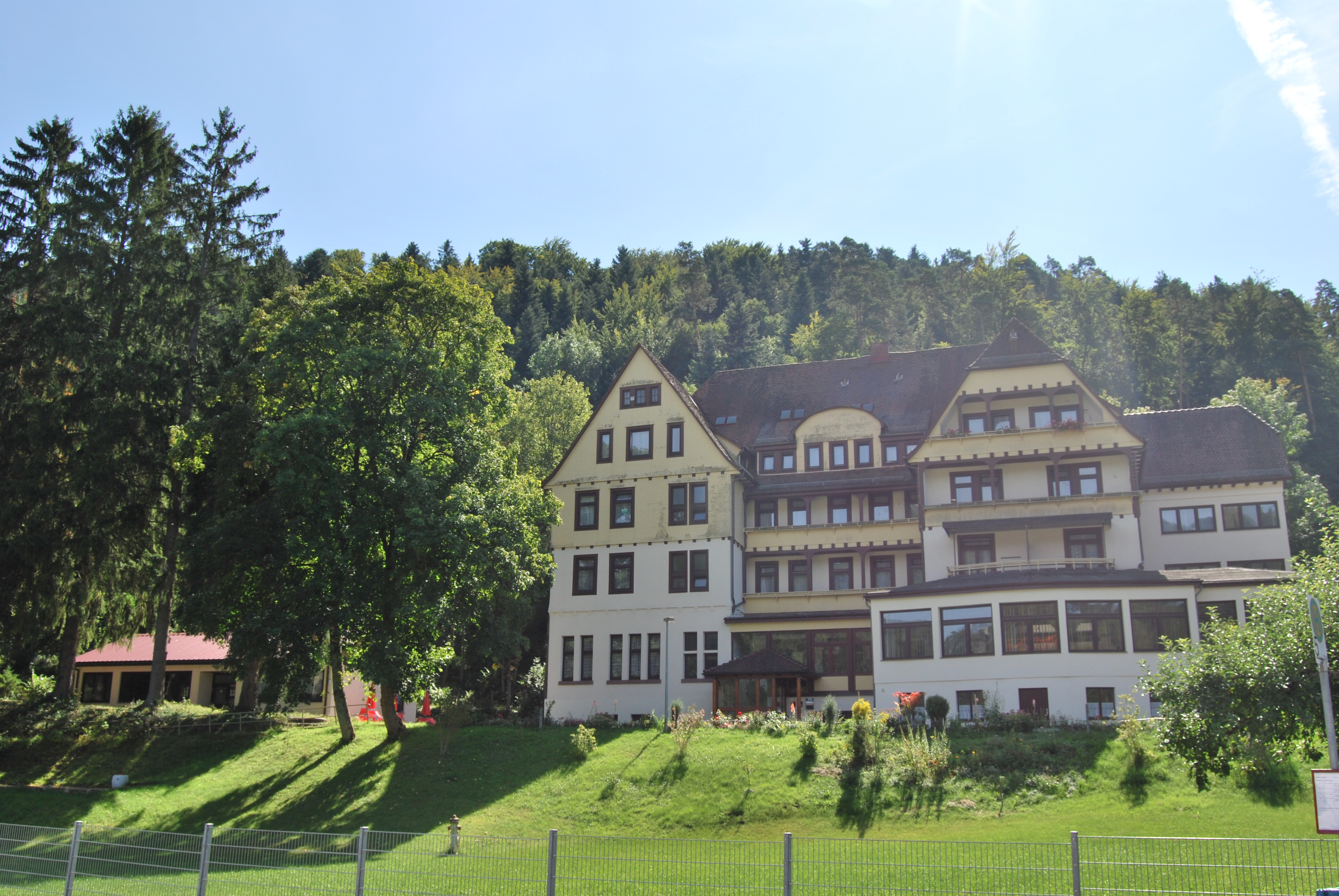
- Free Baptist Church in Sulz am Neckar

- Coat of arms

- Location of Sulz am Neckar within Rottweil district
- Interactive map of Sulz am Neckar
- Location within Germany Location within Baden-Württemberg
- Coordinates: 48°21′46″N 8°37′54″E
- Country: Germany
- State: Baden-Württemberg
- Admin. region: Freiburg
- District: Rottweil
- Subdivisions: 9 Ortsteile

Government
  - Mayor (2022–30): Jens Keuchner

Area
  - Total: 87.62 km^{2} (33.83 sq mi)
- Elevation: 443 m (1,453 ft)

Population (2025-12-31)
  - Total: 12,772
  - Density: 145.8/km^{2} (377.5/sq mi)
- Time zone: UTC+01:00 (CET)
  - Summer (DST): UTC+02:00 (CEST)
- Postal codes: 72168–72172
- Dialling codes: 07454
- Vehicle registration: RW
- Website: www.sulz.de

Sulz am Neckar (German pronunciation: [ˈzʊlts ʔam ˈnɛkaʁ], lit. 'Sulz on the Neckar') is a town in the district of Rottweil, in Baden-Württemberg, Germany. It is situated on the river Neckar, 22 km north of Rottweil, and 19 km southeast of Freudenstadt.

Sulz am Neckar came in the possession of the Hohengeroldseck in AD 1242.

At Sulz a powerline for traction current crosses the Neckar Valley in a large span, which is mounted on two 61-metre-tall electricity pylons.

== Geography ==
=== Geographical Location ===
The city is situated between the Black Forest and Swabian Jura as well as between Stuttgart and Lake Constance at the Neckar at an altitude of 410 to 675 m. Sulz has with a size of 87,60 km^{2} the largest municipal area in the Rottweil (district).

=== Urban structure ===
The city of Sulz is divided into the core city of Sulz with its two districts Sulz-Kastell and Sulz-Schillerhöhe as well as the nine districts Bergfelden, Dürrenmettstetten, Fischingen, Glatt, Holzhausen, Hopfau, Mühlheim, Renfrizhausen, Sigmarswangen.

== History ==
=== Early history ===
The first traces of settlement date back to the Celts period, evidenced by a series of burial mounds and a square enclosure.

Fort Sulz, a Roman military camp, was built around the year 74 AD on a hill south of the present-day town centre. Today, the Sulz-Kastell district with an industrial area is located there.

The first documented mention dates back to the year 790 as "villa publica Sulza". The town owes its name to its salt springs, which have shaped the town's history for centuries. The first owners of the saltworks were the Counts of Sulz in the 11th century. Probably from 1250 onwards, the Lords of Geroldseck ruled over the town and the salt works, while the Counts of Sulz were pushed back to marginal possessions; the process has not yet been fully explained. The domain of the counts of Sulz also included Loßburg and the valleys behind Schenkenzell.

The Lords of Geroldseck were also the builders of the Burg Albeck southwest of the city. In 1284 King Rudolf of Habsburg gave Sulz town privileges. Between 1301 and 1473 the town was the seat of the line of the Geroldseckers, who resided here, but despite some inheritances they experienced a steady economic decline in the 15th century and finally had to sell it to Württemberg under massive pressure in 1473.

The Lordship of the Geroldseckers after the expulsion of Duke Ulrich of Württemberg by the Swabian League in 1519 was only an interlude which ended in 1534 with the return of the duke. All that remained for the Geroldseckers was the title "von Geroldseck und Sulz". The city burned down almost completely within the city walls twice (1581 and 1794). It took two years to rebuild it; in the meantime it was plundered again and again by French soldiers.

The district Mühlheim was already mentioned in 772 as Muliheim in the Lorsch Codex.

=== 19th and 20th century ===
For a long time, Sulz in Württemberg was the only salt works in the state. When in 1803 the much more productive salt works on the Kocher became Württemberg, the town lost its economic status as a salt town, but remained the seat of the Oberamts Sulz, which in the early years of the Kingdom of Württemberg gained considerably in size in the course of the new administrative division of Württemberg. In 1867, the expansion of the Stuttgart–Horb railway line on the Horb to Talhausen section connected it to the network of the Royal Württemberg State Railways.

In 1938, during the administrative reform during the NS in Württemberg, the district of Sulz, which had emerged from the upper office of Sulz in 1934, was dissolved and became part of the district of Horb.

Towards the end of the Second World War, a subcamp of the Natzweiler-Struthof concentration camp was established in Sulz am Neckar. In 1944, Gestapo men interrogated and tortured Polish forced labourers suspected of being associated with a resistance organisation in the former district court prison. At least seven of the detainees died in the process.

After the Second World War the city fell into the French occupation zone and thus in 1947 came to the newly founded state Württemberg-Hohenzollern, which was absorbed into the state of Baden-Württemberg in 1952.

During the district reform Sulz became part of the district of Rottweil. With the dissolution of the district Südwürttemberg-Hohenzollern, which took place at the same time, Sulz became part of the region of Freiburg.

From 1963 to 1993 there was a Bundeswehr depot in Sulz.

In remembrance of the former importance of salt extraction from brine, the swimming pool has been filled with brine since the construction of the new open-air pool and is thus the only brine open-air pool in the area.

== Incorporations ==
In the course of the Gemeindegebietsreform in Baden-Württemberg the following municipalities were incorporated into Sulz am Neckar:

- 1 January 1972: Bergfelden, Hopfau and Mühlheim am Bach
- 1 March 1972: Fischingen
- 1 January 1974: Holzhausen, Renfrizhausen and Sigmarswangen
- 1 January 1975: Dürrenmettstetten and Glatt

== Religions ==
Since the Reformation Sulz has been protestant. The Lutheran parish of Sulz has seven parishes, and the districts of Fischingen and Glatt also have their own Lutheran parish. All together belong to the evangelic deanery of Sulz. The town is also the seat of the Sulz church district of the Evangelical-Lutheran Church in Württemberg. The office of the school dean responsible for the Protestant church district Sulz a. N. is located in Freudenstadt. The Berneuchen Movement within the Protestant Church has its centre in the former Kirchberg convent.

The Roman Catholic Church first disappeared from Sulz during the Reformation upheavals of the 16th century. With the renewed influx of Catholics after the Second World War, however, a Catholic city parish was founded. The church St. Johannes Evangelist was built in 1950 according to the plans of the architect Hans Lütkemeier. The Catholic parish belongs to the deanery Rottweil.

In addition, the Volksmission entschiedener Christen, the Freie Baptisten Gemeinde Sulz, a New Apostolic Church, a congregation representing Jehovah's Witnesses and an Islam congregation exist.

== Politics ==
=== City council ===
The municipal elections in Baden-Württemberg 2019 led to the result shown below, which resulted in the following distribution of the 22 (- 2) seats on the municipal council:

party / list	votes	+/- %p	seats	+/-
Free Voters Baden-Wuerttemberg, FWV	42,5 %	+ 1,4	10	± 0
Christian Democratic Union of Germany, CDU	23,4 %	− 8,1	5	− 2
Alliance 90/The Greens, GAL	20,1 %	+ 4,7	4	± 0
Social Democratic Party of Germany, SPD	10,7 %	− 1,3	2	− 1
Alternative for Germany, AFD	3,3 %	+ 3,3	1	+ 1

^{+/- : Difference to the municipal elections on 25 May 2014}

=== Mayor ===
In November 2022 Jens Keuchner was elected mayor.

== Town twinning ==
The city of Sulz maintains a town twinning with

- Montendre, Département Charente-Maritime (France)
- Altenberg (Saxony)

== Economy and Infrastructure ==
=== Traffic ===
Sulz is located on the Plochingen–Immendingen railway and is Regional-Express and Intercity stop of Line 87. There are hourly trains to Stuttgart and Rottweil, two hourly trains to Singen. Occasionally there are also direct connections to Konstanz and Villingen.

Sulz can be reached via Bundesautobahn 81 (Würzburg – Gottmadingen) and the Bundesstraße 14 (Stockach – Waidhaus). The city is 60 km away from Stuttgart and 100 km from Bodensee.

Sulz has an airfield for ultralight aviation. Furthermore there is the VHF omnidirectional range (VOR) Sulz (116.10 MHz).

=== Educational institutions ===
- Albeck-Gymnasium
- Lina-Hähnle-Realschule
- Primary and secondary school with Werkrealschule
- Elly-Heuss-Knapp school, commercial schools Sulz with commercial high school
- Adult education centre

=== Leisure and sports facilities ===
- Outdoor pool susolei (swimming pool filled with brine (salt water)

== Culture and sightseeing ==
Sulz is Located on two scenic routes, the Hohenzollernstraße and the Römerstraße. They lead fast the following sights:

- Stone Fountain Stock of the Market Square Fountain (1807) with decorated cast metal plates
- Epitaphs of the old cemetery laid out in 1542
- Bronze tomb of Anna von Hohengeroldseck born Gräfin von Lindow und Ruppin and her son Walter in the Sulzer Stadtkirche (1533)

=== Museums ===
- Gustav Bauernfeind-Museum in the building Untere Hauptstraße 5
- Cultural and museum centre in Glatt castle
- Römerkeller-Museum in the area of the former Roman Fort Sulz
- The studio of the art foundation Paul Kälberer in the district of Glatt contains an exhibition of paintings and graphics by Kälberer

=== Buildings ===
- The castle of today's Ruin Albeck was built at the end of the 13th century by Baron von Geroldseck and was destroyed and set on fire on 30 December 1688 by a French patrol corps.
- The Kirchberg convent is a former Dominican convent. Today it serves as a Protestant meeting and retreat house.
- The Bernsteinschule, former academy of arts in the former convent of the Franciscan friars in Bernstein.
- The 24 m high observation tower Mettstetten, built in 1998 is located not far west of the Sulzer district Dürrenmettstetten. Its viewing platform is located exactly at 700 m above sea level.

== Notable people from Sulz am Neckar ==
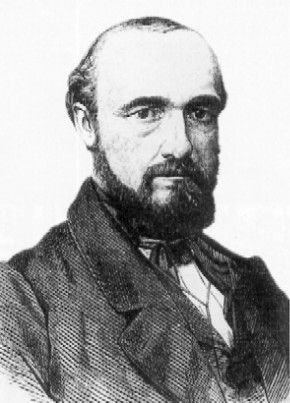
Carl Reinhold August Wunderlich

- Sixtus Riessinger (ca. 1440 - ca. 1505), a German printer active in Italy.
- Salomon Schweigger (1551–1622 ), Lutheran theologian, anthropologist, orientalist and pilgrim
- Joseph Gottlieb Kölreuter (1733-1806), botanist, professor of natural history and anthecology
- Friedrich August von Alberti (1795-1878), geologist
- Carl Reinhold August Wunderlich (1815–77), physician and pioneer psychiatrist.
- Gustav Bauernfeind (1848–1904), notable Orientalist painter, illustrator and architect
- Lina Hähnle (1851–1941), pioneer of bird conservation.
- Richard Schmid, (DE Wiki) (1899–1986), lawyer and politician (SPD) local Landesminister and member of the German resistance
- Brigitte Peterhans (1928-2021), German-American architect

== Gallery ==
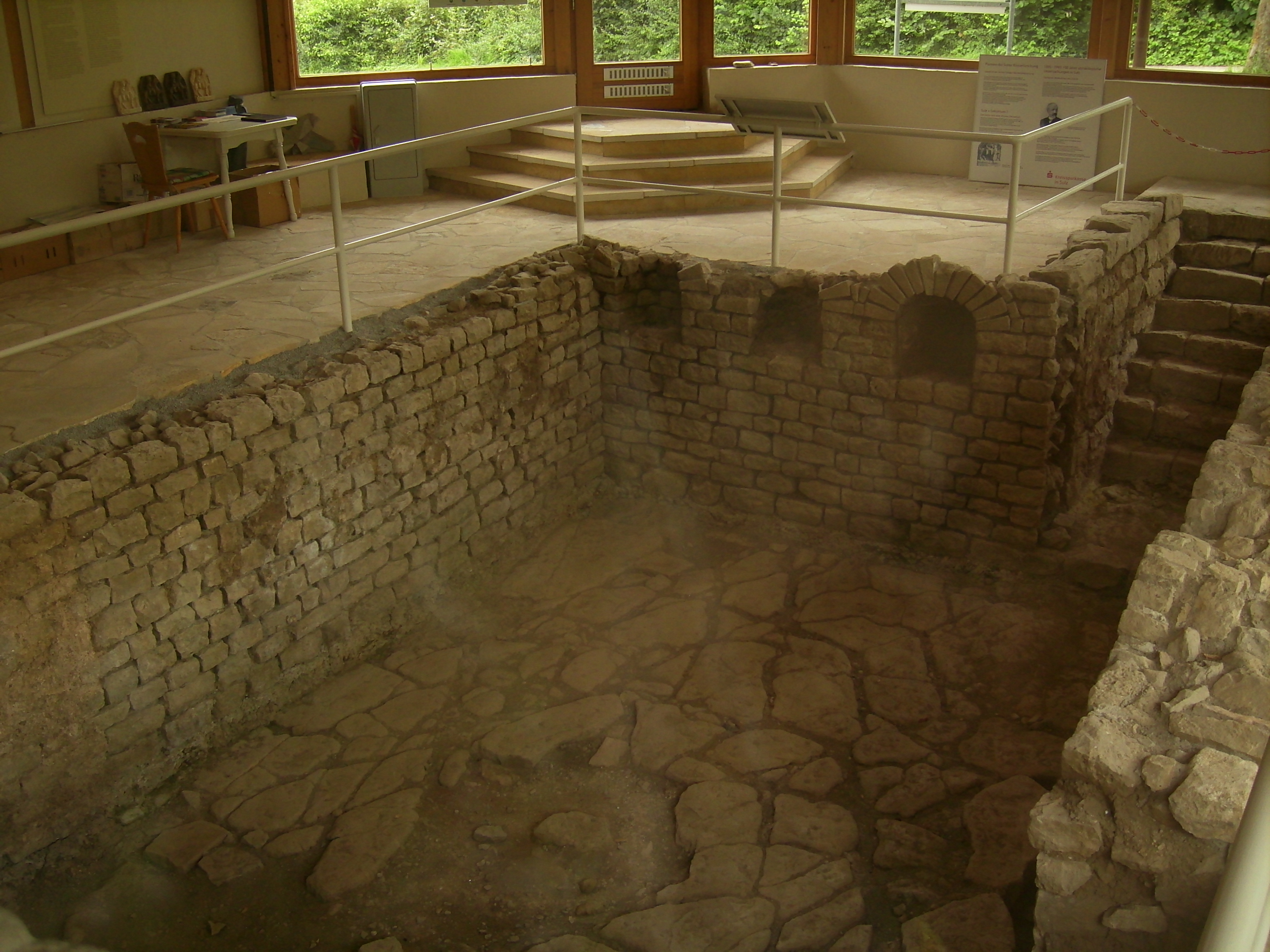
Römerkeller

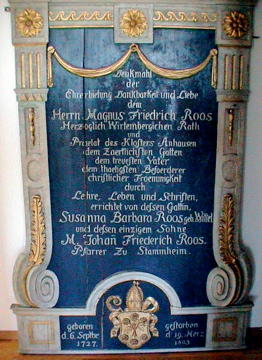
Epitaph on Magnus Friedrich Roos

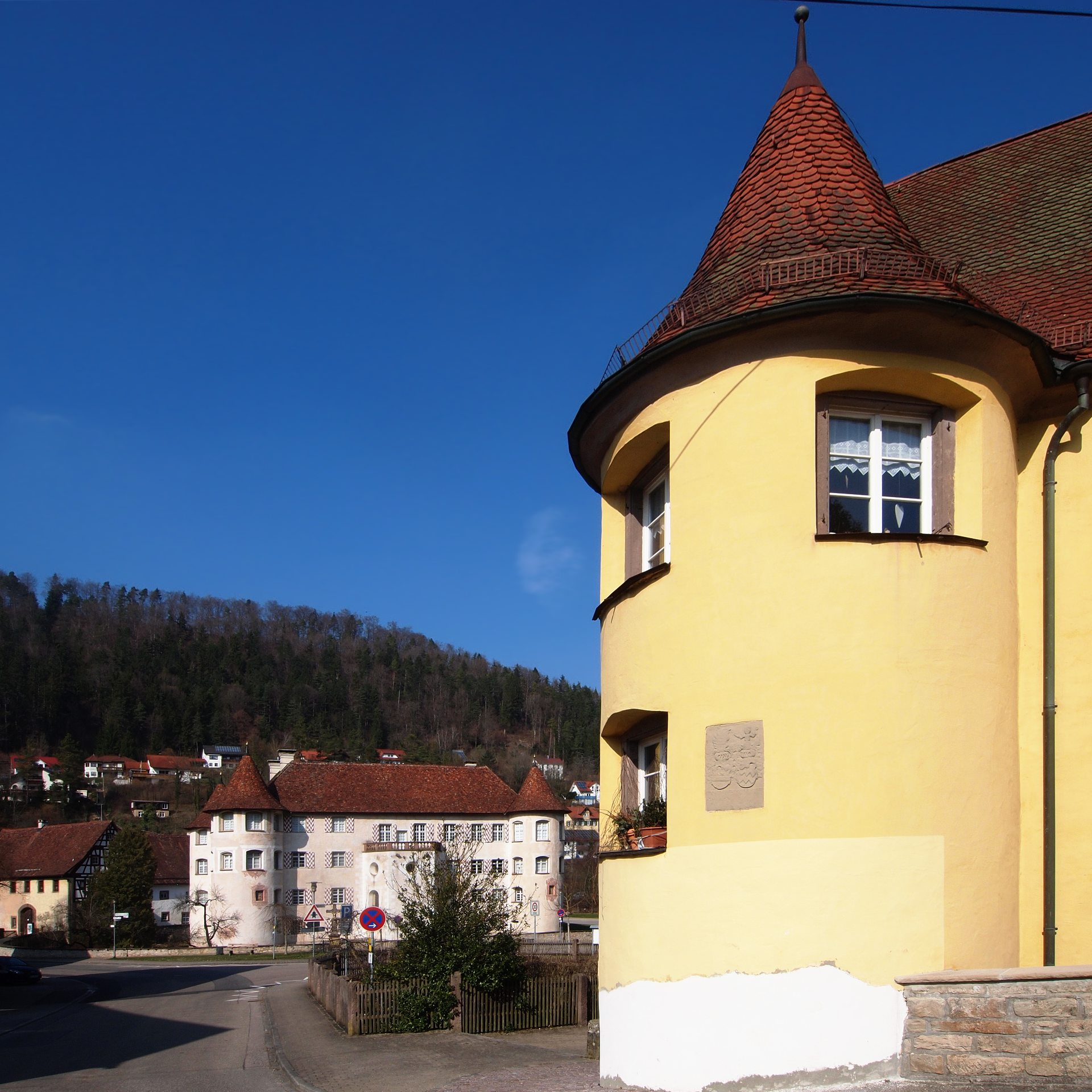
Water castle and rectory in Glatt
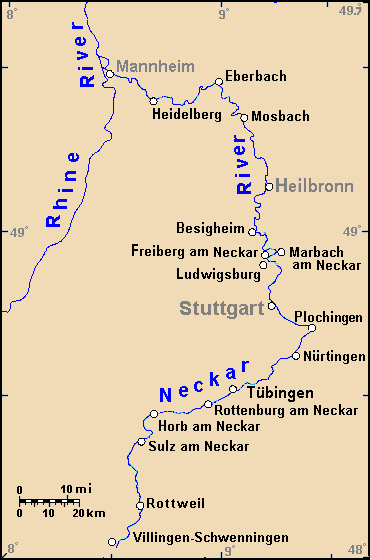
Sulz am Neckar on Neckar River
