= Berneuchen Movement =

Berneuchen Movement (German: Berneuchener Bewegung) is part of the Lutheran Liturgical movement in Germany. It originates from German Youth Movement.

The movement was born in the 1920s, after the radical changes caused by World War I. The founders felt, that it was necessary to give to the spiritual life a greater and more perfect concrete form, in order to throw off the influence of liberal theology. The group met annually in the Berneuchen Manor near Neudamm in the New March, which gave the name for the circle. In 1926 the circle published the Berneuchener Buch, written by Karl Bernhard Ritter, Wilhelm Stählin, Ludwig Heitmann and Wilhelm Thomas.

Berneuchen societies today include Berneuchener Dienst, Evangelische Michaelsbruderschaft and Gemeinschaft Sankt Michael, and its centre is the Kirchberg convent, the "Berneuchener Haus" near Sulz am Neckar in Baden-Württemberg.

The Berneuchen movement has put emphasis e.g. on Bible reading, daily office and celebration of Eucharist. The movement has been an important field of Christian ecumenism.

The annual "Das Gottesjahr" was published 1921-1940 and since 1952 the journal "Quatember" has been edited four times a year by Berneuchen societies.
