= Hermann Hähnle =

Hermann Hähnle (5 June 1879 – 25 October 1965) was a German engineer, bird conservationist, and cinematographer who produced films on bird conservation. He was the son of Lina Hähnle, who was known as the "bird mother" for her work in bird conservation in Germany and the founding of the Bund für Vogelschutz which he headed in later life.

Hähnle was born in Giengen an der Brenz, the fifth child of factory owner and privy councillor Hans and the renowned bird conservationist Lina Hähnle. The family moved to Stuttgart where he was educated at the Eberhard-Ludwig-Realgymnasium before going to Stuttgart Technical University. In 1906 he worked at his father's wool factory Vereinigte Filzfabriken Giengen. He became a senior engineer and in 1928 he married Gertrud Bergmann of Karlsruhe. He was an avid skier and took an interest in photography. Hähnle's financial means allowed him to take to cine photography at a time when it was expensive. He shot family videos from 1901 and took his first stereoscopic images in 1902. In 1899 he owned a 35 mm Kine-Messter Camera which could take 90 seconds of video. He later shifted to colour and used the Autochrome Lumière and Arthur Traube's Uvachrome processes. He also experimented with telephoto equipment. He began to follow the wildlife photographers Carl-Georg Schillings and Georg E. F. Schulz. He began to give lectures along with his mother in schools from 1906 with his films and photographs as part of programs of the German Society for Bird Protection that his mother had founded. He filmed the wild bison of the forests of Białowieża just at the start of the First World War. He took a special interest in photographing rare and endangered fauna. At that time, egrets were threatened by the plume trade and one of his well known films was on the great egrets of Dobruja ("Edelreiher in der Dobrudscha", 1918). In 1920 he made a film on lapwings whose eggs were used for food. He shifted to color film in 1937. After the death of his mother, he became the head of the bird protection society. He also continued to head an electricity utility company that he founded. As an engineer he was involved in innovations and had nearly 200 patents. In the field of bird conservation, he worked on solutions to the problem of electrocution of birds on high-voltage lines. He made nature films a popular genre of documentary films.
