= University Church of Marburg =

Coordinates: 50°48′29″N 8°46′19″E

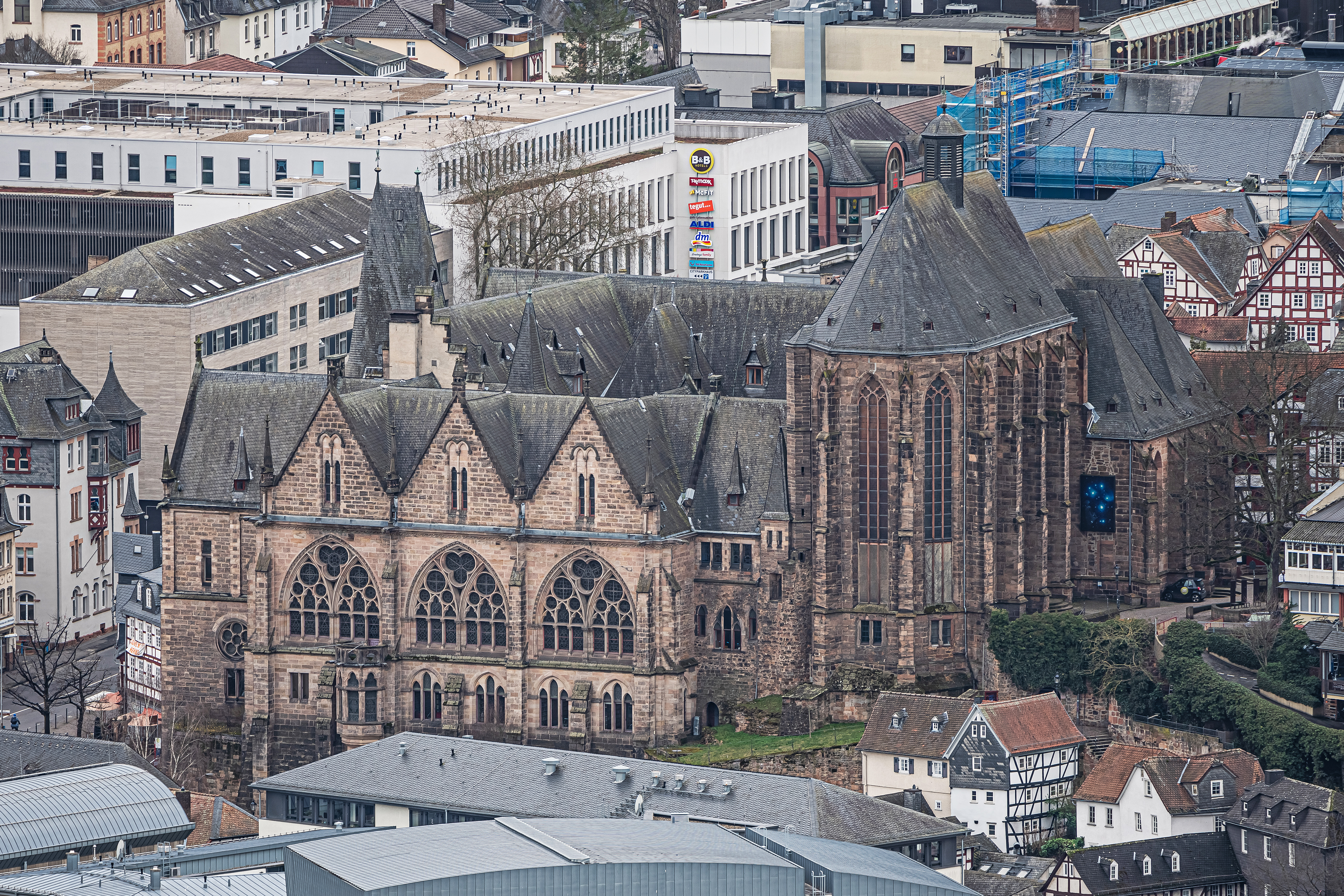
University Church of Marburg

The University Church of Marburg is a 13th-century, asymmetric, two-aisled hall church in Marburg, Hesse.

== History ==
The foundation of the church came in 1291, the era of Gothic architecture. The Dominican Order originally received permission from Henry I, Landgrave of Hesse to build a monastery and church. The Dominicans were popular among the population because they contributed to the poor and health care expenses. They received generous donations which enabled them to richly endow the church, built in dedication to John the Baptist.

In 1527, after the introduction of the Protestant Reformation in the Landgraviate of Hesse, the monastery was secularized and its property was handed over as the material foundation for the newly formed Philipps University, which taught in the monastery buildings until 1873. The University Church was also used for funerals of former professors. At times, the buildings around the church were used as granaries. In 1653, after the Thirty Years' War, the university and the church were re-opened by William VI, Landgrave of Hesse-Kassel.

A redesign and refurbishing of the interior was completed in 1927 on the occasion of the 400th anniversary of the university under the auspices of the then priest Karl Bernhard Ritter.

== Specifications ==
The church is asymmetrical with two spans. The side aisle and centre aisle are the same height. It has only a nave, and a transept is not present. The church is accessible via two entrances, the west gate and the north gate. The polygonal choir across from the nave is somewhat elevated. The church and choir are oriented to the east. It directly adjoins the convent, the later premises of the Old University, and is thus not freestanding.

When one enters the nave through the west gate, one faces directly towards the choir, which was erected first. There are three panel windows with tracery in the choir, though they have been altered or replaced. The Organ is also located in the choir. The elaborately worked choir screen, which separates the choir from the nave, dates from 1927, the 400th anniversary of the university. It was added post hoc, just like the galleries and the organ.

Even if a south side aisle were planned, it would not be possible, because the alley is already there, and therefore the necessary space is lacking. Thus the side aisle is located on the north side, next to the alley. On the south side, the buttresses, which customarily reach outwards, as evidenced on the north side, have been relocated to the inside. Since the former cloister was attached to the facade of the south wall, relocation to the inside seemed to be the best alternative. Besides, there is a full length gallery inside the church on the south side.

There is a turret on the roof. It is mentioned in the literature that the Dominicans, as a mendicant order, were not entitled to build a tower, so they built a ridge turret instead. The roof was completed after the construction of the choir in 1420.
