= Kirchberg convent =

Coordinates: 48°21′29″N 8°43′58″E

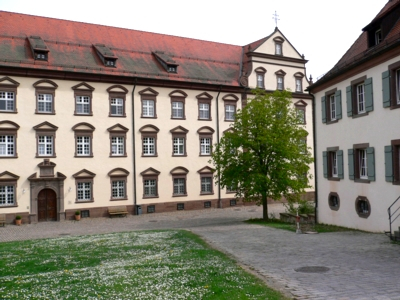
The Kirchberg monastery in Baden-Wuerttemberg, Germany.

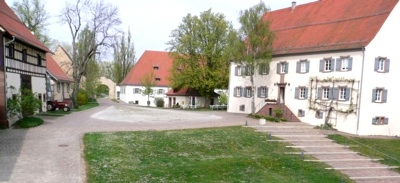
Another picture of the monastery

The Kirchberg convent (also the Monastery Kirchberg) is a monastery located in Sulz am Neckar in Baden-Wuerttemberg, Germany. The monastery is considered to be one of the most historically important religious buildings in Baden-Wuerttemberg. It also ranks as one of the oldest, having been built in the early 13th century, and one of the first female church houses in central Europe.

== History ==
The Kirchberg monastery was a convent built in 1237, on the site of a former castle. In 1245 the monastery was recognised by Pope Innocent IV. Over roughly the same period, the number of nuns entering the convent went from around ten to sixty. This rise in the population of the convent can be credited in part to the apparent surge of 'religious awareness', with more women (of every class) wanting to live the life of a nun or at least one of piety in order to ensure that they remained spiritually healthy. The convent continued its religious work for the next 500 years, despite the many changes that occurred in the area. However, after a secularisation that occurred in 1806, the monastery was virtually condemned to disuse: the nuns that were there were allowed to remain for the rest of their lives, but no more were allowed to join. The last nun left the monastery in 1865.

== Today ==
Today, the monastery is used as any normal church house. It is the centre of the societies of the Berneuchen Movement. Every morning, at 7:45am, a service of praise is held. At noon, a prayer service is held. Another is held at 6pm, and then at 9pm. These sessions are respectively known as Lauds, Sext, Vespers and Compline. Celebration of Eucharist also takes place at the monastery every Sunday and Thursday. As of 2007, the minister of the Kirchberg monastery is pastor Peter Schwarz.

== See also ==
- Berneuchen Movement
