= Jagdbergtunnel =

Tunnel near Jena, Germany

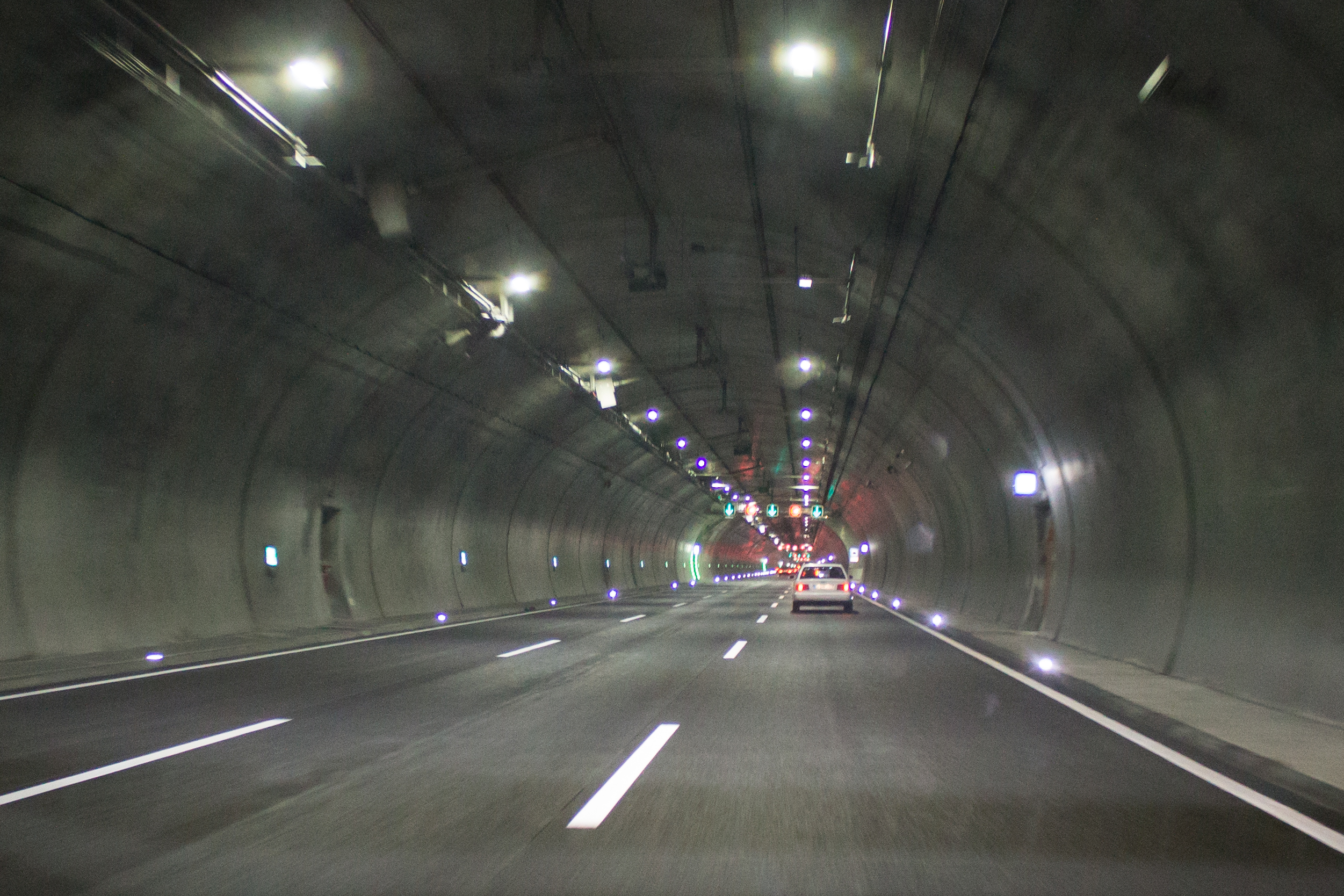
The tunnel in 2015

The Jagdbergtunnel is a 3.074 km tunnel on Bundesautobahn 4, west of the town of Jena, in Germany. Construction began in 2008 and lasted until 2014, when the tunnel opened. The tunnel was built to expand the capacity of the Autobahn, while protecting Leutratal nature reserve, an important site for European orchids. It is one of the ten longest road tunnels in Germany.
