= Leutra (Jena) =

River in Germany

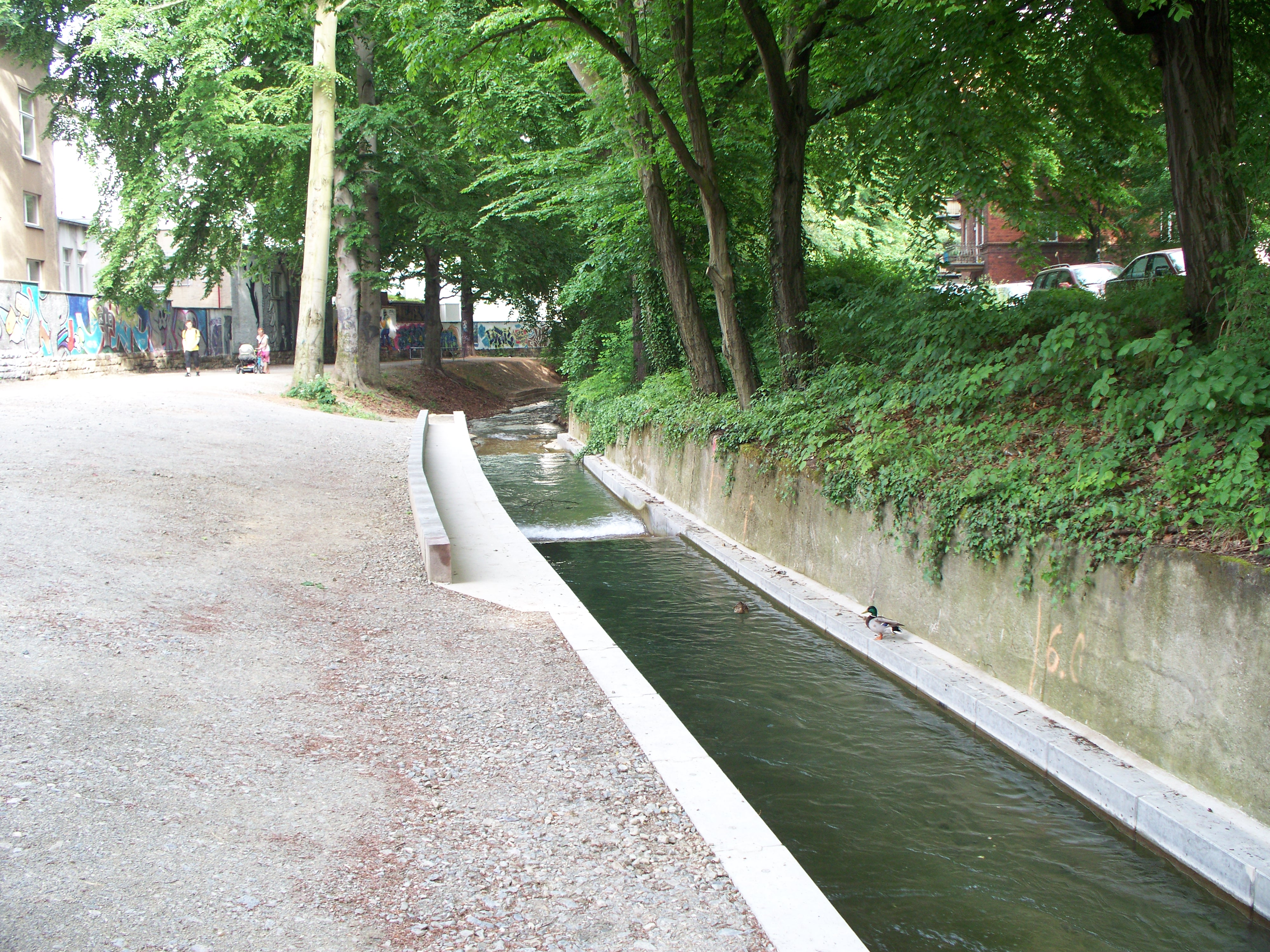

Location
- Country: Germany
- States: Thuringia

Physical characteristics
- Mouth
  - location: Saale
  - coordinates: 50°55′21″N 11°35′6″E

Basin features
- Progression: Saale→ Elbe→ North Sea

Leutra is a small river in Thuringia, Germany. It flows into the Saale in the centre of Jena. Another small river also named Leutra flows into the Saale in the village Maua (part of Jena), 6 km to the south.

== See also ==
- List of rivers of Thuringia
