= Evangelische Michaelsbruderschaft =

Lutheran brotherhood

The Evangelische Michaelsbruderschaft (EMB) (Evangelical Brotherhood of St. Michael) is a German religious Brotherhood belonging to Berneuchen Movement as a part of Lutheran Liturgical Movement.

Founded in Michaelmas 1931 in the Upper Chapel (Holy Cross Chapel) of the University Church of Marburg, the Michaelsbruderschaft consists of men, lay and clergy, following a rule of life. The trias martyria (effective witness for Christ), leiturgia (renewal of personal and corporate piety and of sacramental worship), and diakonia (service in society) was first developed within the Michaelsbruderschaft. Members try to put these aims into practice in their individual communities.

The Brotherhood is led by the Ältester (Eldest) who is assisted by the Rat (council) and Kapitel (chapter). The Ältester of the Brotherhood today is Helmut Schwerdtfeger.

Today the Michaelsbruderschaft consists of about 250 Brothers from the whole of Central Europe. Brethren are mostly Lutheran, but also from Reformed and Union Churches, Methodist, Old Catholic, Christian Catholic and Roman Catholic Churches. Today there are Brethren in Germany, Austria, Hungary, France, Switzerland, Poland, Romania and Iceland.

The Michaelsbruderschaft has got its own breviary for its daily office, the Evangelisches Tagzeitenbuch (ISBN 978-3-525-62446-3), and its own missal, Die Feier der Evangelischen Messe (2009).
