= Naturschutzbund Deutschland =

German nature conservation organization

Coordinates: 52°31′23″N 13°22′43″E

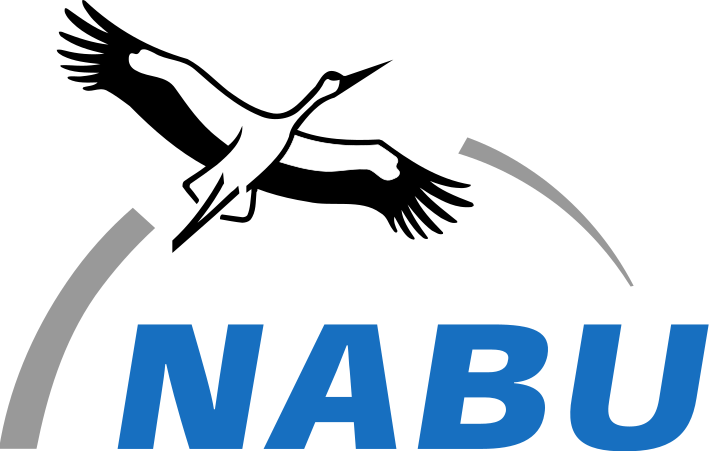

- Abbreviation: NABU
- Motto: Working for people and nature
- Established: 1899 (127 years ago)
- Founded at: Stuttgart
- Types: nonprofit organization
- Legal status: Registered association
- Headquarters: Berlin
- Country: Germany
- Membership: 776,600 (2024)
- Chief Executives: Leif Miller, Susanne Baumann, Ingo Ammermann
- Chairpersons: Jörg-Andreas Krüger
- Part of: BirdLife International
- Revenue: 102,969,488 (2025)
- Total Assets: 73,949,285.85 (2025)
- Employees: 289 (2025)
- Volunteers: 75,000 ±5000 (2025)
- Website: www.nabu.de

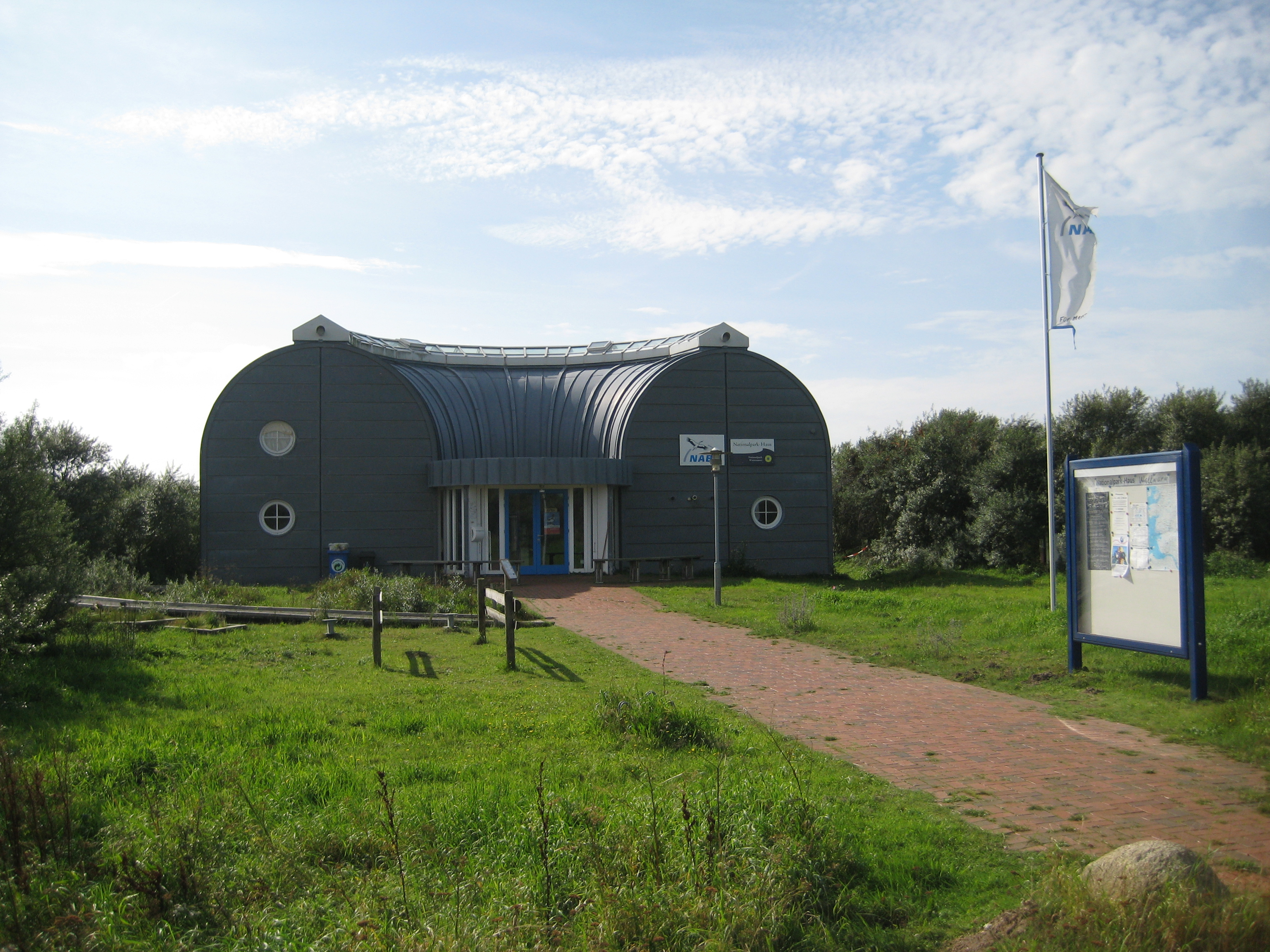
NABU Station Haus Wattwurm on the Speicherkoog Dithmarschen

The Naturschutzbund Deutschland e.V. (lit. "Nature Conservation Union of Germany"; abbreviated NABU) is a German non-governmental organisation dedicated to conservation at home and abroad, including the protection of rivers, forests and individual species of animals. As of September 2025 Jörg-Andreas Krüger is its president, while Susanne Baumann and Ingo Ammermann are its managing directors.

NABU is the national partner of BirdLife International for Germany.

== Overview ==
NABU is one of the largest, oldest, and most well-known nature conservation groups in Germany. NABU carries out specific conservation projects, maintains a research institute, runs environmental training, and informs the media and public about important topics connected with the environment and nature conservation.

The society is formally recognised by the German state as an environmental and conservation society, a body responsible for public issues (Träger öffentlicher Belange), and must therefore be consulted over issues affecting the ecology.

NABU has, together with its sister organisation in Bavaria, about 960,000 members (as of June 2022) as active conservationists or supporters. They are organised into about 2,000 local groups across Germany.

== Securing areas ==
One focus since the organisation was founded has been securing areas for nature conservation. NABU has an area of over 160,000 ha (400,000 acres), with over 5,000 nature conservation areas throughout Germany. The NABU National Natural Heritage Foundation (Stiftung Naturerbe) manages the areas.

== History ==
NABU was founded by Lina Hähnle on 1 February 1899 in Stuttgart as the Bund für Vogelschutz or union for bird conservation. In 1990 the Bund merged with the Naturschutzbund of East Germany to form the Naturschutzbund Deutschland. Michael Succow, the father of the East German conservation program, was elected as vice president. It is primarily thanks to him that 14 large landscapes in eastern Germany were placed under protection upon reunification. Since then, NABU's focus has broadened and it has built up divisions for international conservation projects, marine conservation and energy sufficiency.
