= History of deaf education in the United States =

Local evolution of the education of the deaf

The history of deaf education in the United States began in the early 1800s when the Cobbs School of Virginia, an oral school, was established by William Bolling and John Braidwood, and the Connecticut Asylum for the Deaf and Dumb, a manual school, was established by Thomas Hopkins Gallaudet and Laurent Clerc. When the Cobbs School closed in 1816, the manual method, which used American Sign Language, became commonplace in deaf schools for most of the remainder of the century. In the late 1800s, schools began to use the oral method, which only allowed the use of speech, as opposed to the manual method previously in place. Students caught using sign language in oral programs were often punished. The oral method was used for many years until sign language instruction gradually began to come back into deaf education.

== Early history ==
Before the 1800s, few, if any, educational opportunities existed for deaf children in America. Some wealthy families sent their children to Europe's schools, but many non-high class children had no access to education.

=== Early oral education in the United States ===
In the eighteenth and early nineteenth centuries, many wealthy colonists sent their deaf children to Europe to receive schooling. The best known deaf educational institution was the Braidwood Academy in Edinburgh, Scotland, established in 1760 by Thomas Braidwood as the "Academy for the Deaf and Dumb." The Braidwood Academy was an expensive private oral school that was very secretive about its methods, only sharing their methodology with a few select people.

The Bolling family, who lived in Virginia, were the most prominent colonists to send their deaf children to the Braidwood Academy. Thomas Bolling and his wife Elizabeth Gay (who was also his first cousin) had three deaf children, John, Mary, and Thomas Jr., as well as at least two hearing children. John was the first of the three children to go to the Braidwood Academy in 1771, with Mary and Thomas Jr. arriving later. The three Bolling children arrived back in the United States in 1783; however, they became ill shortly after arriving home, and John died on October 11, 1783. Because of this, it cannot be determined how effective the ten years of oral instruction he received were. Mary and Thomas Jr. lived for at least another four decades, and comments about Thomas Jr. noted that he was a "miracle of accomplishments."

The next generation of hearing Bollings had deaf children, and they wanted their children to be educated in the United States. William, the last child of Thomas and Elizabeth, married his first cousin Mary, who bore five children, two of whom were deaf. The couple's first deaf child, William Albert, drove his father's desire to create a school for the deaf in America. William Bolling met John Braidwood, a descendant of Thomas Braidwood, after he arrived in America in 1812. Bolling invited Braidwood to stay in his home as Braidwood sorted out a more permanent living arrangement. Braidwood discussed with Bolling his desire to open a school similar to the Braidwood Academy in America. After many setbacks, the Cobbs School was established in 1815. It closed about a year and a half later, in the fall of 1816, when Braidwood's personal problems caused him to leave the school and Bolling could no longer financially maintain it.

=== Early manual education in the United States ===
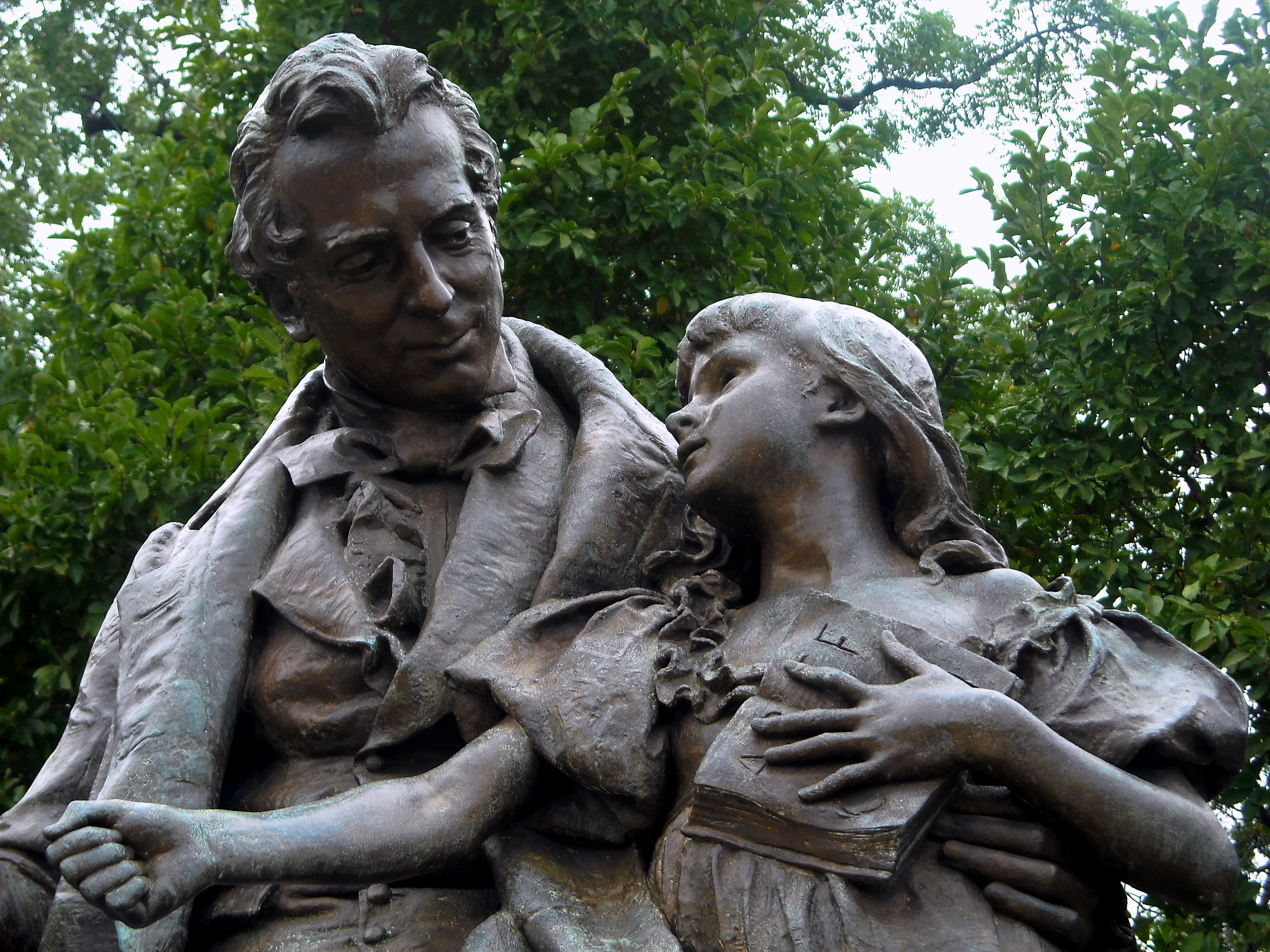
A sculpture of Thomas Hopkins Gallaudet and Alice Cogswell located on the Gallaudet University campus

In 1812 in New England, Thomas Hopkins Gallaudet met a little girl named Alice Cogswell, who inspired him to create a school for the deaf in the United States. In 1815, he traveled to Europe to gain insight on their methods of teaching deaf students. He attempted to learn from the Braidwood system, but the administrators wanted him to sign a contract, remain at the school for several years to be trained in oralism, and agree to keep the teaching methods of the school a secret; Gallaudet refused this. He attended a lecture in France by Abbé Sicard showcasing two successful pupils of Paris' National Institution for Deaf-Mutes, Jean Massieu and Laurent Clerc. Gallaudet spent several months at the school, and he convinced Clerc, a thirty-year-old assistant teacher, to return with him to Hartford, Connecticut. Back in America, they established the Connecticut Asylum for the Deaf and Dumb, which was later named the American School for the Deaf, in 1817. Gallaudet was the director, and Clerc was the first deaf teacher in America. Alice Cogswell was one of the first seven students.

For most of the remainder of the century, education of deaf children using sign language, a practice known as manualism, continued to grow. Approximately forty percent of all teachers were deaf. More than thirty schools for the deaf were opened, the majority of which were manual. In October 1829 Ohio School for the Deaf was established; it is the fifth oldest residential school in the United States. and is the only publicly funded residential school for the deaf in Ohio. William Willard was the first deaf superintendent in America and founded Indiana School for the Deaf in 1843. Gallaudet College (now Gallaudet University) was founded in Washington, D.C in 1864 with Thomas Hopkins Gallaudet's son, Edward Miner Gallaudet, as the school's superintendent. Edward Miner Gallaudet strongly believed in the use of sign language and had a number of arguments with Alexander Graham Bell, an oralist.

Before the 1860s and before the American Civil War, manual language was very popular among the Deaf community and also supported by the hearing community. The hearing community viewed deafness as “[isolating] the individual from the Christian community”. At the time, the people of the United States were fairly religious (notably Christian), and the hearing-advantaged believed that sign language opened deaf individuals' minds and souls to God. Through this, the hearing community believed that manualism brought deaf people closer to God and opened deaf people to the Gospel, which brought manualism general acceptance.

Prior to the 1860s, the American hearing community viewed manualism, sign language, as an art, and naturally beautiful. They also thought of deaf people who signed as being like the Romans because of the pantomimes that are a part of the language.

== Change from predominantly manual education to oral education ==
By the end of the American Civil War in the late 1860s, the argument for “Survival of the Fittest” was applied to the issue of education for the deaf as a result of a Darwinist perspective of Evolution. This movement brought manualists arguing their view that signs were closer to nature because the first thing babies learn to do is gesture, which is akin to sign language. To the Deaf community, manualism was at the time considered a gift from God. During this particular time in the United States, oralism was coming about which gave some a negative view of manualism because, it was argued, it was not a natural language.

Support for oralism gained momentum in the late 1860s and the use of manualism started to decrease. Many in the hearing community were now in favor of the evolutionary perspective, which depicted deaf people who used manual language akin to “lower animals”. Some hearing people viewed speech as what separated humans from animals, which in turn caused manual language to be viewed as unhumanlike. The first schools for oralism opened in the 1860s were called The New York Institution for the Improved Instruction of Deaf Mutes and The Clarke Institution for Deaf-Mutes (now the Clarke Schools for Hearing and Speech).

At that time the teaching of manual language was restricted because the American Hearing Society saw deaf people who used it as different, as foreigners, or as a group with a separate language that was a threat to the hearing society. Members of the hearing community who were in favor of oralism took offense to deaf people having their own group identity and refusing to integrate within the greater community.

Oralists believed that the manual language made deaf people different, which in turn led them to believe that deaf people were abnormal. Oralists believed that the teaching of oralism allowed deaf children to be more normal. Oralists strongly believed that deaf children should put as much effort as possible into learning how to live in spite of their disabilities, thus promoting the teaching of lip reading, mouth movements, and use of hearing technology. Oralists also argued that if deaf people continued the use of manual language as their form of communication, they would never integrate within the rest of society.

It has been remarked that the better-funded northern schools switched to oralism while their poorer southern counterparts kept signing because it was difficult to hire new oralist teachers.

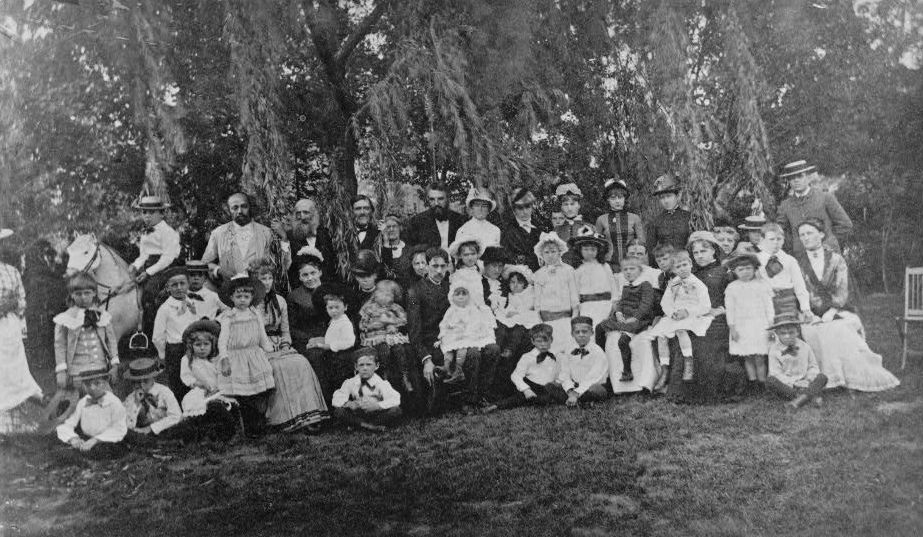
Alexander Graham Bell with a group of deaf students from the Scott Circle School, 1883

A model figure for oralism and against the usage of sign language was Alexander Graham Bell, who created the Volta Bureau in Washington, D.C. to pursue the studies of deafness. Two other Americans who encouraged the founding of oralist schools in the United States were Horace Mann and Samuel Gridley Howe, who travelled to Germany to see their oral schools and who wished to model them.

In 1880, an event called the Second International Congress on Education of the Deaf (which, despite the name, was actually the first) took place. The Second International Congress was an international meeting of deaf educators from at least seven countries. There were five delegates from America and around 164 delegates total in attendance. The Congress was planned and organized by a committee created by the Pereire Society, a group that was against sign language. More than half of the people invited were known oralists; therefore, the Congress was biased and most, if not all, of the resolutions that were voted on by the delegates gave results in favor of the oral method. Many of the resolutions were worded in ways that supported the oral method, such as "Considering the incontestable superiority of speech over signs in restoring the deaf-mute to society, and in giving him a more perfect knowledge of language,/Declares –/That the Oral method ought to be preferred that of signs for the education and instruction of the deaf and dumb". Until the 1890s, deaf education in the United States was limited to children as in the school of Sarah Warren Keeler, but Lillie Eginton Warren and her assistant, Edward B. Nichie, expanded the teaching to adults.

== Early 20th century ==
After the Congress, deaf education in America changed. Manualists, those who advocated for sign language usage, were effectively "kicked out" and replaced with teachers who used the pure oral method. Deaf teachers were removed from the profession and replaced with hearing ones. Most schools switched to the oral method or were created as oral schools in the first place, and few manual schools remained in existence. The work of deaf educators in the oralist schools, who were mostly women, was to prepare the deaf children for life in the hearing world, which required them to learn English, speech, and lipreading. All students that were sent to the oral schools were forced to use the oral method, and oralist schools restricted the deaf students' use of American Sign Language (ASL) in class and in public. Students in pure oral programs were not allowed to sign in class and were also forbidden to sign in dormitories. Students caught signing were punished, but students continued to learn sign from each other anyway. One type of punishment used on deaf students was to force them to wear white gloves that were tied together to prevent them from using signs. Those who were not successful under the oral method after several years were transferred to manual classes and considered "oral failures" who would never know anything or be able to make it in the world. Some consider this the "Dark Age of Oralism".

Edith Mansford Fitzgerald opposed these views, as a deaf woman who felt that the oralist methods had stunted her learning. In 1926, she published a book, entitled Straight Language for the Deaf: A System of Instruction for Deaf Children was published in 1926 and was widely influential in the field of deaf education. Her Fitzgerald Key at one point was used in around 75% of the institutes teaching the deaf.

=== Instructors ===
In the early 20th century there was an increase of instructors who were deaf in many schools for the deaf. In America one of the biggest debates the deaf community had with the institutions was whether to hire more instructors who were deaf instead of hearing. Part of the reason why parents of students who are deaf wanted instructors who were deaf was to allow their children to have a role model, by allowing more instructors who were deaf allowing their children to see a possible future for themselves through their instructors.

== Late 20th century ==
The almost exclusive use of the pure oral method in deaf education continued well into the twentieth century. Then, during the late 1960s, Roy Kay Holcomb coined the term "Total Communication". This term described an educational philosophy he popularized where the child could use the communication method that worked best for them given their needs. If a child learned better with American Sign Language or an English sign system, they were taught using that method. If a different method worked better with another child, they received their instruction that way. Some schools using the oral method changed to Total Communication; others just added sign into their existing program or simply allowed children to sign amongst themselves without punishment. Often, the "sign languages" used in oral programs were constructed Manually Coded English (MCE) systems such as Seeing Essential English or Signing Exact English or were ASL signs in English word order. The programs used these systems in order to use them with speech in a practice known as Sign Supported Speech or Simultaneous Communication.

=== Deaf President Now ===
In 1988, Gallaudet University students decided that they would take matters of their education into their own hands. The sixth president of Gallaudet had announced in late 1987 that he would be resigning his position as president. By early 1988, the committee that selected the candidates had narrowed it down to three finalists, two of which, Dr. Harvey Corson and Dr. I. King Jordan, were deaf, and one of which, Dr. Elisabeth Zinser, was hearing. On March 6, it was announced hastily through press release (even though the selection committee was supposed to come on campus) that Zinser, the only hearing candidate, had become the seventh president of the university. There had been rallies beforehand for a deaf president (most notably on March 1), but on the 6th, the rallying changed into protest. Students and faculty went on marches, made signs, and gave demonstrations. The students locked the gates to the university and refused let the school open until Zinser resigned. Under intense pressure from the students protesting, Zinser resigned on the fifth day of the protest, March 10. Many students decided to stay on campus instead of going on Spring Break, which was scheduled to begin on March 11. Two days later, on March 13 Jane Spilman resigned and was replaced by Phil Bravin as chair of the Board of Trustees, a taskforce was created to figure out how to achieve a 51% majority of deaf people on the Board of Trustees, and no one received any punishment for being in the protest. I. King Jordan was named eighth president—and first deaf president—of Gallaudet University.

Deaf President Now changed deaf education. Before the protest, a select few deaf people held doctorates; however, since the protest, the number of deaf people pursuing and earning advanced degrees has steadily increased. Also, schools for the deaf across America have had “mini DPNs” where students demanded deaf superintendents and senior administrators. In addition, collegiate programs were created in other countries that did not previously have them (such as Japan, Sweden, and South Africa). Deaf President Now not only affected deaf education in America, but it also affected deaf education worldwide.

In 1990, cochlear implants were approved for children two years of age and up. This drastically changed education for deaf children. More children than ever were migrated out of bilingual-bicultural residential schools and into oral schools and mainstream programs with no extra supports. Parents were not encouraged to sign with their children because it was feared that it would slow down their speech, even though research has shown that the opposite is true. This move from residential schools to day schools and mainstreaming has caused many residential programs to downsize.

=== Instructors ===
In the most recent years the deaf community has been fighting hard for more instructors who are deaf in the public school system. In 1991 Carlsbad Unified School District parents went to the school board to complain about the lack of any instructors who are deaf. Many parents stated that their children are not getting the best education they could be getting because of the lack of representation of instructors who are deaf. However, the department head of the deaf education program says his instructors are trained for deaf and hard of hearing students. Many parents felt that having the background of understanding of deaf education is vastly different from being a person who is deaf.

== Today ==
Today, there are a few different methods used in the education of deaf children in the United States.

All deaf students, regardless of placement, receive an Individualized Education Program (IEP) that outlines how the school will meet the student's individual needs. The Individuals with Disabilities Education Act (IDEA) requires that students with special needs be provided with a Free Appropriate Public Education in the Least Restrictive Environment that is appropriate to the student's needs. Government-run schools provide deaf education in varying degrees of settings ranging from full inclusion to schools for the deaf.

=== Bilingual-bicultural education ===
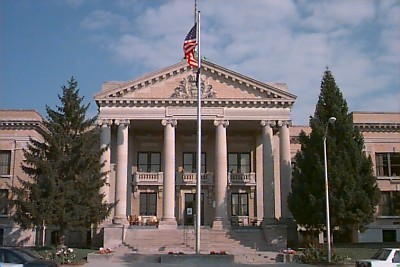
The Alumni Hall, the middle and high school at Indiana School for the Deaf, a bilingual-bicultural school

In this educational method, deafness is not seen as a medical issue; it is instead seen as a cultural issue. In the bilingual-bicultural program, it is advocated that children who are deaf be taught ASL as a first language, then be taught written and/or spoken English as a second language. Bilingual-bicultural programs emphasize that English and ASL are equal languages, and they work to help children develop age-appropriate levels of fluency in both languages. The bilingual-bicultural approach holds the belief that deaf children are visual learners as opposed to auditory learners, and therefore, academic content should be fully accessible to all deaf students (i.e. not contingent on spoken receptive/expressive skills, which may vary across students), so academic content is delivered in ASL and/or written English. Since it is not possible to simultaneously produce grammatically correct, fluent American Sign Language and spoken English, only one language is used at a time. Because there is no risk in learning sign language, the bilingual-bicultural approach mitigates the risk of language deprivation (a condition that arises when children have limited access to both spoken and sign language). Many bilingual-bicultural schools have dormitories, and deaf children can either commute to the school daily or stay in a dormitory as part of the residential program and visit their families on weekends and/or holidays and school vacations.

==== Residential programs ====
A residential program is an educational program in which a student lives at a school for the deaf during the week and goes home on weekends or holidays instead of commuting to the school daily. In residential programs, deaf children are fully immersed in Deaf culture. At a residential school, all students are deaf or hard of hearing, so deaf students are not looked at as different. They have "a common heritage,… a common language,… and a set of customs and values". People at deaf schools help pass on "Deaf folklore and folklife (jokes, legends, games, riddles, etc.)" from one generation to the next. Deaf parents of deaf children often send their children to residential schools so that they may participate in the Deaf community and culture. Hearing parents are often a bit more reluctant because they do not want to be separated from their children. The first deaf woman to hold the position of superintendent of a residential school for the deaf in the U.S. was Gertrude Scott Galloway.

=== Auditory-oral and auditory-verbal education ===
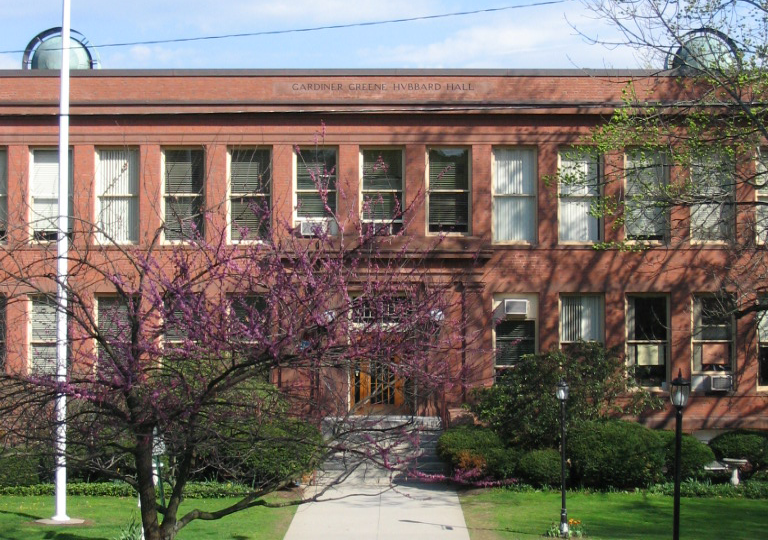
Hubbard Hall is the former main school building at the Northampton campus of Clarke Schools for Hearing and Speech, an oral school. It became an apartment building in 2016.

The auditory-oral and auditory-verbal methods, sometimes referred to collectively as listening and spoken language, are forms of oral education. These methods are based on the belief that a deaf child can learn to listen and speak and that families do not need to learn sign language or cued speech. These methods are presented as communication options, and they rely on a large amount of parental involvement. Children who use this option may be placed in a continuum of educational placements including oral schools, such as Clarke Schools for Hearing and Speech, self-contained classrooms for deaf students in public schools, or mainstream classrooms with hearing students. Though some deaf children can learn to use hearing devices to speak and understand language, that is not the case for all deaf children. Therefore, auditory-oral only education puts children at risk of language deprivation: a condition that arises when children have limited access to both spoken and sign language. Unlike children who receive auditory-oral-only education, deaf children who use both signed and spoken language speak as well as their hearing counterparts.

=== Mainstreaming and inclusion ===
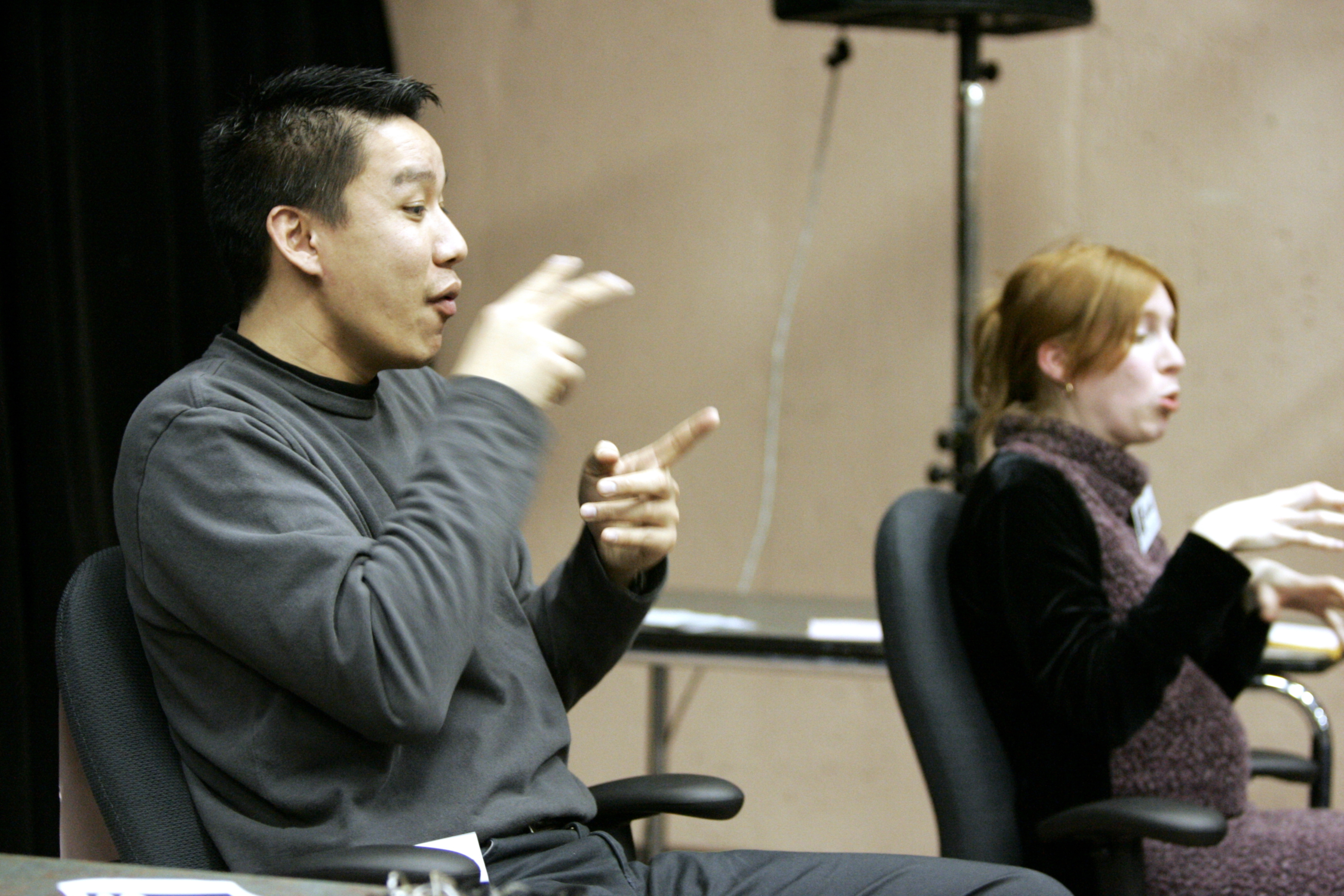
Two interpreters working for a school

This educational method is what occurs when a deaf child attends public school in regular classes for at least part of the school day. Students may receive accommodations such as itinerant teachers, interpreters, assistive technology, notetakers, and aides. Inclusion can have benefits like the opportunity to live at home, but it can also have drawbacks such as isolation and limited availability of support.

== See also ==
- Deaf culture
- Education of the deaf
- History of deaf education
- History of sign language
- Category:Schools for the deaf in the United States
- Second International Congress on Education of the Deaf
