= Deaf culture in the United States =

In the United States, deaf culture was born in Connecticut in 1817 at the American School for the Deaf, when a deaf teacher from France, Laurent Clerc, was recruited by Thomas Gallaudet to help found the new institution. Under the guidance and instruction of Clerc in language and ways of living, deaf American students began to evolve their own strategies for communication and for living, which became the kernel for the development of American Deaf culture.

== Introduction ==
A Deaf American is defined as a member of the American Sign Language (ASL) linguistic minority. Though they are medically deaf, children of Deaf people and a few hearing people who learn ASL can become adopted into the wider Deaf community. Inversely, Deaf American is not inclusive to all people with hearing loss but only those who use ASL as their primary language.

== Terminology ==
=== deaf and Deaf ===
In 1972, Professor James Woodward, co-director of the Centre for Sign Linguistics and Deaf Studies at the Chinese University of Hong Kong since 2004, proposed a distinction between deafness and the Deaf culture. He suggested using deaf (written with a lower case d) to refer to the audiological condition of deafness, and Deaf (written with an upper case D) to refer to Deaf culture.

deaf vs. Deaf

A U.S. state regulation from the Colorado Department of Human Services defines Deaf (uppercase) as "A group of people, with varying hearing acuity, whose primary mode of communication is a visual language (predominantly American Sign Language (ASL) in the United States) and have a shared heritage and culture," and has a separate definition for deaf (lowercase).

This convention has been widely adopted within the culture and the scholarly literature in English, and to some extent in other languages. The two terms are also widely used to refer to distinct but partially overlapping groups of people: deaf people (those with significant hearing loss) vs. Deaf people (those who identify with Deaf culture and use a sign language as a primary means of communication). Not everyone makes this distinction, however; some point out that there are many ways to be "deaf" and a simple two-way distinction is too confining.

"People-first" language rejected

=== "People-first" language rejected ===
In Deaf culture, person-first language (i.e., person who is deaf, person who is hard of hearing) has long been rejected since being culturally Deaf is seen as a source of positive self-acceptance. Instead, Deaf culture uses Deaf-first language: Deaf person or hard-of-hearing person. Capital D-Deaf is as stated prior, is referred to as a student who first identifies as that. Lower case d-deaf is where a person has hearing loss: typically, those that consider themselves deaf, first and foremost prior to any other identity.

=== Hearing-impaired and hard-of-hearing ===
Hearing-impaired and hard of hearing

Hearing people may use the term hearing-impaired, perhaps thinking it is more polite than deaf, but Deaf people tend to reject it, for a variety of reasons. It is more likely to be used for people with a mild or moderate hearing loss or for people who have acquired deafness in adulthood rather than by those who have grown up Deaf. By contrast, those who identify with the Deaf culture movement typically reject the label hearing-impaired and other labels that imply that deafness is a pathological condition, viewing it instead as a focus of pride. Further, the term focuses entirely on the physical condition of deafness, while ignoring the linguistic and cultural distinction between those who sign and identify with Deaf culture, and those who do not.

The term hard-of-hearing is preferred over hearing-impaired within the American Deaf community and accepted as a neutral term without negative or pathological connotations, with no implication about age of onset. It generally refers to people who depend primarily on a spoken language for communication or who have mild or moderate hearing loss. An ASL term hard-of-hearing exists and is roughly equivalent to the English term.

=== Deprecated terms: deaf-mute and deaf and dumb ===
Various terms once used to refer to the deaf are no longer used and may be viewed either as out-of-date, or an insult, such as deaf-mute, or deaf and dumb. Formerly these terms were neutral, or at least accepted, as can be seen by nicknames such as baseball player Dummy Hoy, or the former names of educational institutions, since renamed, such as Pennsylvania School for the Deaf (formerly Pennsylvania Institute for the Deaf and Dumb), Gallaudet University (formerly National Deaf-Mute College).

Deaf-mute is a literal translation of the French sourd-muet which was already in use in France in the 19th century, in the works of the founder of the deaf school in Paris, as well as in the name of the school, the Institution Nationale des Sourds-Muets à Paris. Since some Deaf people can also speak, the term deaf-mute is not accurate. The word dumb had meant 'speechless' for centuries in English before it gained the sense of 'stupid' as a secondary meaning in the 19th century, but since 'stupid' has now become the primary meaning, even though the term is still widely understood in the secondary meaning in the particular expression, it is now unsuitable to refer to Deaf people.

== Language ==
The history of Deaf Americans, for the most part, parallels that of American Sign Language (ASL).

Although Deaf American identity is now strongly tied to the use of American Sign Language, its roots can be found in early deaf communities on the American East Coast, including those that communicated using Martha's Vineyard Sign Language. Martha's Vineyard Sign Language bloomed from necessity due to a high number of hereditary deaf Americans in the area. The language became so popular, even the hearing Vineyard workers adopted it. The Vineyard language contributed hundreds of signs to the modern ASL utilized today.

An important event in the history of Deaf Americans was the introduction of the methodical sign system of the Abbé de l'Epée to deaf children at the American School for the Deaf in 1817 by Laurent Clerc, a French signer who accompanied Thomas Gallaudet to become the first teacher at the school.

This tradition continued until 1880 when oralism (promoting speaking) began to replace manualism (promoting signing) as the dominant approach to deaf education, almost obliterating ASL and deaf culture in America. Oralism was the main philosophy in deaf education until 1965 when the linguist William Stokoe argued that ASL should be regarded as a full language with all of the expressive power of any oral language. This gradually led to an increase in the respectability and use of signing.

=== Dialects among Deaf Americans ===
There are various dialects of ASL being used in the Deaf community. These dialects typically vary dependent on the educational methodology used in each individual Deaf persons childhood, however, can vary dependent on other factors (such as having an intersectional Black Deaf identity).

The Deaf subgroup that are native signers and went to Deaf schools all their life typically have a dialect that is independent from English. Deaf individuals who attended Deaf schools growing up often have a different signing style than mainstreamed Deaf individuals (Deaf people that attended schools along with hearing individuals with or without access to an interpreter).

Mainstreamed Deaf individuals will sometimes use Pidgin Signed English (PSE) if their first language was English. These varieties of dialects are similar to accents in spoken language.

Black Deaf Americans will often use Black American Sign Language (BASL). This separate dialect developed due to segregationist policies which limited communication between white Deaf individuals and Black Deaf individuals.

== Deaf art ==
The accomplishments of Deaf artists have been noted with many factors contributing to a natural attraction to visual arts. Three factors have been noted: biological factor, isolation factor, and the Deaf essence factor.

As "people of the eye," Deaf people are naturally attracted to the visual arts.

A desire to express themselves to the world through visually accessible medium may be a reason for such a strong Deaf artist community. Due to frustration with limited communication in home and school life (leading to feelings of isolation), many Deaf artists report that art creates a way for them to freely express their thoughts and feelings. Similar to the art of other marginalized and oppressed groups, Deaf art tends to be a vessel through which one's Deaf identity (Deaf essence) can manifest.

The American Deaf artist Christine Sun Kim expresses her frustration with the hearing world using visual art, interactive installations, and performance art.

=== De'VIA (Deaf View/Image Art) ===
Proposed by Deaf artists in 1989 at the Deaf Way festival, the concept of De'VIA represents the elements found in the Deaf art movement. Betty Miller and Chuck Baird are the most notable founders of the De'VIA art movement.

==== Difference between Deaf artists and De'VIA ====
Deaf artists create and use art in any form and are held to the same standards as any other artist. De'VIA is created when the Deaf artists wants to express their Deaf identity and/or Deaf experience through their art. It is possible for Deaf artists not to work within De'VIA.

==== Themes of resistance and affirmation ====
Many De'Via works can be defined as resistance art, which is a recent phenomenon in Deaf culture. Betty Miller's piece Ameslan Prohibited (1972) depicts two shackled hands and chopped fingertips; this powerful image encouraged more Deaf people to reveal their childhood experiences of audism and oralism through art.

In many of Chuck Baird's artwork, he cleverly incorporates ASL handshapes into the shapes of objects to which they refer. For example, his piece titled America has the stripes of the U.S.A. flag incorporated into the sign for AMERICA. De'VIA provides scenes of meaningful aspects of being Deaf that affirm the rich lives that Deaf people enjoy.

Themes associated with De'VIA
Resistance vs. Affirmation De'VIA
Resistance De'VIA	Affirmation De'VIA
Audism	Empowerment
Oralism	ASL
Mainstreaming	Affiliation
Cochlear implants	Acculturation
Identity confusion	Acceptance
Eugenics	Deafhood

== Norms of Deaf American culture ==
- The use of American Sign Language (ASL) is favored over secondary codes such as Signed Exact English (SEE). ASL is a separate language from English and the Deaf community rejects English-like signing.
- It is important to maintain a high awareness of all that is going on in one's environment and to help keep others similarly informed because "deaf people do not have access to the noises that clue us in to what others are doing when out of view". It is common to provide detailed information when leaving early or arriving late and withholding such information is considered rude.
- Introductions are an important aspect of Deaf culture. This exhibits the effort to find common ground. "The search for connections is the search for connectedness."
- Time is also considered in a different light for the Deaf community. Showing up early to large-scale events, such as lectures, is typical. This is motivated by the need to get a seat that provides the best visual clarity for the deaf person. It is also common to be late to social events such as meeting friends for coffee or play dates with children. This could have stemmed from the fact that until recent years, with the creation of text messaging, it was nearly impossible to inform a friend when running late. However, at Deaf social events, such as parties, it is common for Deaf people to stay for elongated amounts of time, for the solidarity and conversations at social gatherings for the Deaf are valued by Deaf culture. This can be explained by the fact that the Deaf community stretches throughout the entire country, so to gather means that a lot of 'catching up' is necessary. Colloquially Deaf people refer to these altered attitudes regarding time as Deaf Standard Time (DST).
- A positive attitude toward deafness is also expected within the Deaf community. In Deaf culture, deafness is not considered a condition that needs to be fixed (see Medical model of disability). ASL also holds great importance to the Deaf community and its identity: it represents the liberation of language minority, oppressed for many years by oralist teachings.

== Attitudes toward cochlear implants ==
Within Deaf communities, there is strong opposition to the use of cochlear implants and sometimes also hearing aids and similar technologies. This is often justified in terms of a rejection of the view that deafness, as a condition, is something that needs to be 'fixed'.

Others argue that this technology also threatens the continued existence of Deaf culture, but Kathryn Woodcock argues that it is a greater threat to Deaf culture "to reject prospective members just because they used to hear, because their parents chose an implant for them, because they find environmental sound useful, etc." Cochlear implants may improve the perception of sound for suitable implantees, but they do not reverse deafness, or create a normal perception of sounds.

== Attitudes toward oralism as a teaching method ==
There is strong opposition within Deaf communities to the oralist method of teaching deaf children to speak and lip read with limited or no use of sign language in the classroom. The method is intended to make it easier for deaf children to integrate into hearing communities, but the benefits of learning in such an environment are disputed. The use of sign language is also central to Deaf identity and attempts to limit its use are viewed as an attack.

Negative attitudes towards oralism as a teaching method stems from the Second International Congress on Education of the Deaf which heavily restricted the use of sign language in the classroom from 1880 to the late 1960s and early 1970s. Sign language continued underground among students, however, was not recognized as of academic importance among the hearing world until the publications of William Stokoe were released in the 1960s.

== See also ==
- National Association of the Deaf
- National Theatre of the Deaf
