= Training Institute of the Deaf in Berlin Neukolln =

Berlin Neukölln

The Training Institute of the Deaf in Berlin-Neukölln was founded in 1788 as a school for the deaf. Some German schools had been founded by educators trained in France by Abbé de l'Épée. The common view at the time was that the deaf were uneducable; they were even feared and shunned. L'Épée's school, students, and disciples helped to change that view. The Paris school, which had been founded by the Abbé Charles Michel de l'Épée in 1771, was using French Sign Language in combination with a set of methodically developed signs. During l'Épée's lifetime, many schools were founded throughout Europe that were modeled on his teaching methods. Other German schools, such as the institute, were founded on the principles and methods of Oralism. Oralism is the idea that the Deaf should learn to speak in order to appear normal with the non-Deaf world, it became predominate in German schools. In 1811, this school became a training institute for teachers. Students from all over Prussia were sent here to receive training.

== Pre Nazi-era ==
Deaf education before this time was at its peak. In 1926 there were seventy-three schools for the Deaf, 707 teachers of the Deaf, and 6,149 documented Deaf students Around the time of World War I, Germans began to embrace the eugenics movement. Eugenics sought to arrange reproduction within the human population to increase the occurrence of heritable characteristics regarded as desirable. Eugenics soon began to be taught in the curriculum at the institute, beginning with first-year students. Gotthold Lehmann, in 1924, added the following classes to the curriculum:

- Eugenics
- The science of human heredity and German race cultivation
- Contemporary problems in the maintenance of public welfare (heredity, eugenics, sterilization, conservation)
- The theory of heredity and race hygiene
- Hereditary diseases
- General studies of Deafness, the collaboration of the schools for the Deaf in the implementation of the Law for the Prevention of Offspring with Hereditary Diseases
- Environment and hereditary predisposition
- Views on race hygiene
- The theory of human heredity as the basis for race hygiene

== Nazi era and the training of deaf teachers ==
Because of this new curriculum aligned with Nazi party ideals, The institute became the main facility for training teachers of the Deaf. They incorporated Nazi racial ideas like eugenics, the science of human heredity and German race cultivation. It seems that the surviving existence of these schools were the only positive aspect within the Deaf community at this time. However, these exact schools were what funneled the Deaf towards their suffering. In fact, the teachers and administrators within these institutions were greatly responsible for informing on their Deaf students.
