= Samuel Heinicke =

German educator

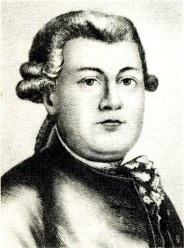
Samuel Heinicke.

Samuel Heinicke (10 April 1727 – 30 April 1790), the originator in Germany of systematic education for the deaf, was born in Nautschütz, near Zschorgula in the Electorate of Saxony.

Entering the electoral bodyguard at Dresden, he subsequently supported himself by teaching. Around 1754, he took his first deaf pupil. His success in teaching this pupil was so great that he determined to devote himself entirely to this work. Heinicke promoted a chiefly oral/aural method of instruction, though he did use some form of a manual alphabet. He believed a spoken language to be indispensable to a proper education, and that it formed the basis for reasoning and intellectual thought. He died before his contributions to Deaf education became widespread, but John Baptist Graser (1766–1841) and Friedrich Moritz Hill (1805–1874) continued to espouse the oral method.

The outbreak of the Seven Years' War upset his plans for a time. Taken prisoner at Pirna, he was brought to Dresden, but soon made his escape. In 1768, when living in Hamburg, he successfully taught a deaf boy to talk, following the methods prescribed by Amman in his book Surdus loquens, but improving on them.

Recalled to his own country by the elector of Saxony, he opened the first deaf institution in Leipzig, Germany, in 1778. He directed this school until his death. He was the author of various books on the instruction of the deaf.
