= Schools for the deaf =

School specializing in educating deaf students

A school for the deaf is a school which specializes in educating students who are deaf and hard-of hearing.

== History ==
The first known school for the deaf was the Institut National de Jeunes Sourds de Paris, established in France between 1750 and 1760 by Charles-Michel de l'Épée. L'Épée was the leader in establishing sign language for the deaf and is notable as the "father" of deaf education. French Sign Language was developed and heavily influenced by L'Épée working with deaf people who were already using their own home signs and combining those signs with new signs, which, in this time period, became known as L'Épée sign language. This French sign language became a major foundation and influence on all international sign languages, especially on American Sign Language, which still retains much of the historical signs and signing grammatical structure that originated from France.

The Cobbs School, founded in 1815 in Chesterfield County, Virginia, was the first school for teaching Deaf and Mute people in the United States; however, it closed in 1816. The American School for the Deaf, in West Hartford, Connecticut, was established in 1817, the following year, by Thomas Gallaudet in collaboration with deaf French teacher Laurent Clerc, with support from the well-known Hartford Cogswell family. Alice Cogswell was the first student to attend this school in 1817. Thomas Gallaudet spent time in Paris observing French Sign Language and education at The National Institute for the Deaf.

== Higher education ==
Higher education institutions for specifically deaf and hard-of-hearing students are limited. Gallaudet University, based in the U.S., is the only institution of education whose courses are made specifically for Deaf and Hard of Hearing students. Some institutions offer specific programs tailored to deaf and hard-of-hearing students, such as the National Technical Institute for the Deaf, a college of the Rochester Institute of Technology in New York, U.S..

=== Gallaudet University ===
Gallaudet University is a private university in Washington, D.C. It was founded by the youngest son of Thomas Hopkins Gallaudet, Edward Miner Gallaudet and Amos Kendall. The school began as a grammar school and was the first school for Deaf higher education. Known as the National College for the Deaf and Dumb for the first year, the name was changed to the National Deaf-Mute College until 1894 when it was changed again to Gallaudet College. It was made Gallaudet University in 1986 in honor of Thomas Hopkins Gallaudet. Gallaudet University, making it the only institution of high education designed that way worldwide.

== See also ==
- Education for the deaf
- History of deaf education
- History of institutions for deaf education
- List of schools for the deaf
- Category:Schools for the deaf
- Category:Deaf universities and colleges
