= Total communication =

Approach to augmentative/alternative communication that uses a combination of methods

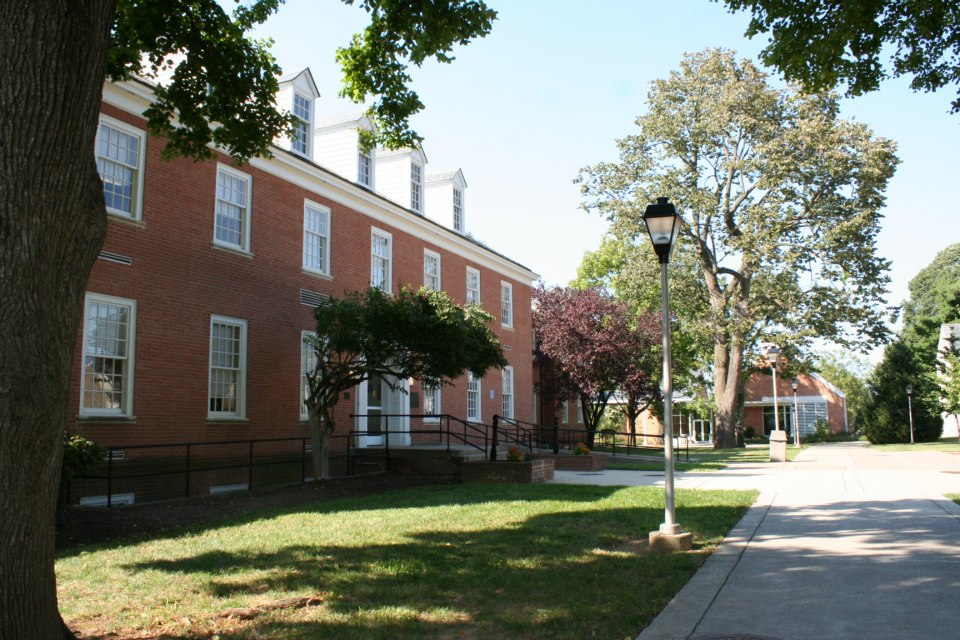
The Maryland School for the Deaf in Frederick, Maryland, where David Denton was superintendent

Total communication (TC) is an approach to communicating that aims to make use of a number of modes of communication such as signed, oral, auditory, written and visual aids, depending on the particular needs and abilities of the person. Total Communication (TC) is usually described as a philosophy, not a method.

== History ==
The American manual alphabet, which is used for fingerspelling

The debate over oral and manual methods in deaf education is more than 200 years old. David Denton, superintendent for the Maryland school for the Deaf, said deaf education in the United States relied on a "simultaneous method" that discouraged signing in class. The term "Total Communication" and its specific philosophy were first used by Roy Holcomb as part of a group of educators in southern California. After Denton became superintendent of the Maryland School for the Deaf he adopted the term "Total Communication" for the school's philosophy.

In the 1970s and 1980s, most schools, programs, and organizations for deaf children supported TC. TC was originally intended to let teachers choose the mode of communication that best fit each child, however, in classrooms this often became simultaneous communication in which a teacher speaks and signs at the same time.

== TC in practice ==
In simultaneous communication, speech led and signing was used after to match it in English word order. The signs came from manual codes such as Seeing Essential English and Signing Exact English, which add signs for word endings and small grammatical words. In the first system, for example, "butterfly" would be signed as two separate words "butter" and "fly". One of the reasons TC spread so quickly was because of the relative ease of learning these codes. Teachers only had to learn signs which also contributed to the spread of TC.

== Research ==
Research on TC in deaf education is limited because of the small and varied populations of deaf students and because of differences in how programs apply TC. A 2002 review by Susan Easterbrooks describes several studies that compared TC with other approaches. Mayer and Trezek (2023) described the debate over TC as one conducted over decades with little research behind it.

In one study, Geers, Moog and Schick (1984) compared 168 deaf children in spoken-language programs, ages 5-9, to 159 deaf children in TC programs. The two groups took assessments testing them on their English grammar and scored about the same. The spoken-language program kids did better when they could speak, reversely, the TC group did better when they could use sign language.

In another study, Musselman and Churchill (1993), followed 2 groups of profoundly deaf children ages 4-7. One group was in a TC program and the other group was in an auditory-oral program (a program that focuses on listening and speaking, with no signing). The two groups did not differ in language ability by mode of communication. In both groups, children whose mothers were less dominant in taking turns in conversation made bigger gains in expressive language.

Another study by Yoshinaga-Itano, Snyder and Mayberry (1996), compared 21 students who used signs, speech and hearing (TC) to 25 students who used speech, hearing and lipreading (oral approach). They compared the students on five measures of written language. They found no significant difference in written language between the two groups.

Finally, Moores and Sweet (1990), tested two groups of students ages 16-17 who had profound hearing loss. Group one consisted of 65 students who used ASL and had deaf parents, and group two consisted of 65 students who used TC and had hearing parents. Researchers tested language, reading, writing, intelligence, speech, and hearing. Group scores were similar on intelligence tests, but differed on many other measures. The researchers did not compare the groups statistically, because both had attended residential schools for some time and how some exposure to TC. Researchers found that speech skills were not a good predictor of how well a student could read. However, how well a student did understand English, as a language, predicted how well they were able to read and write. The researchers concluded the two groups had more in common than not.

Plaza-Pust reports there is no agreement on the effect of TC on spoken language. Luetke-Stahlman (1990) found no sign of better academic achievement for TC students than for students in other programs, and a review by Spencer and Tomblin (2006) concluded that the picture of outcomes remained unclear. The ERIC digest, citing Vernon and Andrews (1990), stated that studies had repeatedly shown benefits of TC for psychosocial, linguistic, and academic development.

Easterbrooks concluded that the most important factor in acquiring communication may be a child's access to a complete language through shared conversations with a parent. She wrote that it did not seem to matter whether that language was spoken English, signed English, or ASL, and that deaf children can develop a complete language when it is available to them from infancy. She added that early mastery of language may be the best

== Debate ==
Supporters of TC argued that requiring deaf children to communicate only through speech was unrealistic. They argued that signing gave children a more accessible way of communication and supported their social and emotional development. The 1997 ERIC digest noted that more than 90% of deaf children have hearing parents. Therefore, many people saw TC as a flexible philosophy that kept all options for learned communication open.

Critics raised several objections about TC. According to Easterbrooks, the main criticism of English-based signing was that it doesn't meet deaf children's communication needs because few parents sign English well, and few teachers can sign a complete message to their students. The ERIC digest added that speaking and signing at the same time could lead to people inadvertently changing their messages to fit one mode. Linguists argued that signed versions of English are not a sound basis for language development.

As criticism of TC and its use of simultaneous communication grew, sign bilingual education emerged in the 1980s as an alternative to TC that used sign language as the language of instruction. By 1997, the main debate was between TC programs and bilingual-bicultural programs. Cochlear implants and earlier diagnosis later renewed the debate. Mayer and Trezek wrote that for the most of the 20th century, deaf children with severe to profound hearing loss had limited access to spoken language, but with the inventions of newborn hearing screening and cochlear implants, they now have meaningful access to it. They add that signing can help a child understand spoken English when they are used along with speech, and there is no evidence signing interferes with learning to speak.

== See also ==
- Bilingual-bicultural education
- Oralism
- Manualism
- Simultaneous communication
- Cued speech
- Deaf education
- Manually coded English
- American Sign Language
- Cochlear implant
- Deaf culture
- Augmentative and alternative communication
- Makaton
