= Moog Center for Deaf Education =

School in St. Louis, Missouri, US

Location
- St. Louis, Missouri; 38°38′10″N 90°27′07″W

Information
- Type: Auditory-oral school for deaf and hard-of-hearing children
- Motto: Where Deaf Children Talk
- Established: 1996
- School district: St. Louis
- Director: Betsy Moog Brooks
- Grades: Birth to Early Elementary
- Website: www.moogcenter.org

The Moog Center for Deaf Education is an American school in St. Louis, Missouri, founded in 1996 by oralist educator Jean Sachar Moog.

The Moog Center is an independent, not-for-profit school that provides education services to children with hearing loss and their families from birth to early elementary years.

Eight certified Moog programs offer oral education for deaf and hard-of-hearing children and their families:

- Buffalo Hearing and Speech Center in Buffalo, New York
- Child's Voice in the Chicago, Illinois, area
- Colegio Las Lomas Oral in Buenos Aires, Argentina
- Desert Voices in Phoenix, Arizona
- The Moog Center for Deaf Education in St. Louis, Missouri
- Northern Voices in the Twin Cities, Minnesota
- Ohio Valley Voices in Cincinnati, Ohio
- Presbyterian Ear Institute Oral School in Albuquerque, New Mexico

The curriculum's focus is accelerating spoken language development and, when the children are ready, helping them learn the same subjects as their hearing age-mates to catch up and fully participate in the mainstream.
