= Second International Congress on Education of the Deaf =

1880 international conference

The Second International Congress on Education of the Deaf, commonly known as the Milan Conference or Milan Congress, was an international conference of deaf educators held in the Regio Istituto Tecnico di Santa Marta, Milan, Italy from 6 to 11 September 1880.

After deliberations, the Conference declared that oral education (oralism) was superior to manual education (sign language) and passed a resolution banning the use of sign language in school. After its passage, various European and American schools largely switched to using speech therapy without sign language as a method of deaf education until the late 1960s and early 1970s, when sign language started to be recognised as the ideal method of deaf education.

In 2010, a formal apology was made by the board at the 21st International Congress on Education of the Deaf in Vancouver, BC, Canada, acknowledging the detrimental effects of such a ban as an act of discrimination and violation of both human and constitutional rights. In 2025 the resolution that was passed in the conference of 1880 was "fully and unequivocally" renounced during the 24th International Congress on Education of the Deaf. Among the reasons given for the renunciation are the "profound and long-lasting harm caused by those resolutions, including the widespread exclusion of sign languages from educational systems and the systematic language deprivation experienced by generations of deaf children" and the acknowledgment that "these measures suppressed a natural human linguistic modality and severely restricted the ability of deaf individuals to fully exercise their human rights".

== Historical background ==
In the 1870s, Alexander Graham Bell and Edward Miner Gallaudet, both prominent US figures in deaf education, had been debating the effectiveness of oral-only education versus an education that utilises sign language as a means of visual communication. Although Bell was not an attendee at the conference himself, his oralist ideas were influential on it.

The organization behind the planning of the conference was the J.R. Pereire Society, formed by Isaac and Émile Pereire the grandsons of oralist educator Jacob Rodrigues Pereira and financed by their railroad and bank holdings (including the Société Générale du Crédit Mobilier). The Pereire Society was a strong proponent of oralism and sought to have this ratified by an international conference.

=== First International Congress ===
In 1878, as part of the Paris World Fair and with the assistance of the French Ministry of Education, Isaac and Émile organised the first in a series of international congresses on the "improvement of the condition of the deaf". More than fifty hearing teachers attended the first congress. Also in attendance was Joseph Marius Magnat, who would become head of an oralist school established by the brothers the following year. A consequential resolution that was passed at the Paris Congress declared that articulation and lip-reading should be the method used in deaf education, and that sign languages should only be used as an "auxiliary teaching tool", in order that deaf people might better assimilate into hearing society. It was decided that the next international congress would be held in Italy two years hence, with Magnat receiving a significant donation to organize it.

== Organization ==
The conference was planned and organized by a committee created by the Pereire Society, and was essentially an attempt by the oralist camp to legitimize an official ban of sign language from deaf education. The committee was composed of Isaac and his son Eugène Pereire, Marius Magnat, Léon Vaïsse amongst others.

They secured this outcome by carefully selecting who was invited to the Milan Conference, inviting the delegates to see the self-declared oralist success in local schools, and by encouraging negative reactions to those giving speeches supporting sign language and cheering those supporting oralism.

== Attendees ==
More than half of the people invited were known oralists; therefore, the Congress was heavily inclined to the oralist camp.

There were 256 attendees, with over half being Italian and just over a quarter being French. There were four deaf attendees: Claudius Forestier, Joseph Théobald - a teacher at the French Institut National de Jeunes Sourds de Paris, James Denison - director of the Kendall School, and Lorenzo del Lupo - an Italian student.

=== Board of officers ===
The elected board of the proceedings were the following:

- President: Caval. Sac. Giulio Tarra - Director of the Institution for the Deaf and Dumb Poor of Province of Milan.
- General Secretary: Professor Pasquale Fornari - Senior Teacher of the Royal School for the Deaf, Milan.
- Vice-President for Italy: Padre Marchiò - Master of the Institution for Deaf -Mutes, Sienna.
- Vice-President for France: Auguste Houdin
- Vice-President for Germany: Dr Treibel - Director of the Royal Institution for Deaf-Mutes, Berlin.
- Vice-President for the English-speaking Section: Isaac Lewis Peet - Principal of the Institution for the Deaf and Dumb, New York, U.S.A.

Giulio Tarra has been described as an "uncompromising champion of speech and lipreading".

=== Delegates ===
The Milan Conference was attended by 164 delegates of various countries. There were large delegations from Italy (87) and France (56), eight delegates from Britain, five Americans, three Swedes and 1 representative each from Belgium and Germany. The remaining delegates' nationalities are unknown.

The five US delegates present were James Denison, Edward Miner Gallaudet, Reverend Thomas Gallaudet, Isaac Lewis Peet and Charles A Stoddard.

There are different numbers recorded on how many deaf delegates were in attendance, but it is thought to be between one and three.

Hearing representatives	Deaf representatives
161	3

Nationality	Number of delegates
Italian	87
French	56
British	8
American	5
Swedish / Norwegian	3
Belgian	1
German	1

== Proceedings ==
Harlan Lane describes the proceedings as such:

The meeting was conceived and conducted as a brief rally by and for opponents of manual language. Setting aside the speeches of welcome and adieu [...] we find that the Milan congress amounted to two dozen hours in which three or four oralists reassured the rest of the rightness of their actions in the face of troubling evidence to the contrary.

During the conference twelve speakers spoke on the contemporary issues connected with deaf education. Nine of the twelve speakers gave an oralist perspective, and three (the Gallaudet brothers, and Richard Elliot, a teacher from England) supported the use of sign language.

Most, if not all, of the resolutions that were voted on by the delegates gave results in favour of the oral method.

=== Resolutions ===
Many of the resolutions were worded in ways that supported the oral method, such as "Considering the incontestable superiority of speech over signs in restoring the deaf-mute to society, and in giving him a more perfect knowledge of language, Declares – That the Oral method ought to be preferred to that of signs for the education and instruction of the deaf and dumb".

The conference passed eight resolutions on deaf education.

1. The convention, considering the incontestable superiority of articulation over signs in restoring the deaf-mute to society and giving him a fuller knowledge of language, declares that the oral method should be preferred to that of signs in education and the instruction of deaf-mutes.

Passed 160 to 4

2. The convention, considering that the simultaneous use of articulation and signs has the disadvantage of injuring articulation and lip-reading and the precision of ideas, declares that the pure oral method should be preferred.

Passed 150 to 16

3. Considering that a great number of the deaf and dumb are not receiving the benefit of instruction, and that this condition is owing to the impotence of families and of institutions, recommends that governments should take the necessary steps that all the deaf and dumb may be educated.

Passed unanimously.

4. Considering that the teaching of the speaking deaf by the Pure Oral method should resemble as much as possible that of those who hear and speak, declares

a) That the most natural and effectual means by which the speaking deaf may acquire the knowledge of language is the "intuitive" method, viz., that which consists in setting forth, first by speech, and then by writing the objects and the facts which are placed before the eyes of the pupils.
b) That in the first, or maternal, period the deaf-mute ought to be led to the observation of grammatical forms by means of examples and of practical exercises, and that in the second period he ought to be assisted to deduce from these examples the grammatical rules, expressed with the utmost simplicity and clearness.
c) That books, written with words and in forms of language known to the pupil, can be put into his hands at any time.

Motion carried.

5. Considering the want of books sufficiently elementary to help the gradual and progressive development of language, recommends that the teachers of the Oral system should apply themselves to the publication of special works on the subject.

Motion carried.

6. Considering the results obtained by the numerous inquiries made concerning the deaf and dumb of every age and every condition long after they had quit school, who, when interrogated upon various subjects, have answered correctly, with sufficient clearness of articulation, and read the lips of their questioners with the greatest facility, declares:

a) That the deaf and dumb taught by the Pure Oral method do not forget after leaving school the knowledge which they have acquired there, but develop it still further by conversation and reading, when have been made so easy for them.
b) That in their conversation with speaking persons they make use exclusively of speech.
c) That speech and lip-reading so far from being lost, are developed by practice.

Motion carried.

7. Considering that the education of the deaf and dumb by speech has peculiar requirements; considering also that the experienced of teachers of deaf-mutes is almost unanimous, declares

a) That the most favourable age for admitting a deaf child into school is from eight to ten years.
b) That the school term ought to be seven years at least; but eight years would be preferable.
c) That no teacher can effectually teach a class of more than ten children on the Pure Oral method.

Motion carried.

8. Considering that the application of the Pure Oral method in institutions where it is not yet in active operation, should be to avoid the certainty of failure prudent, gradual, progressive, recommends

a) That the pupils newly received into the schools should form a class by themselves, where instruction could be given by speech.
b) That these pupils should be absolutely separated from others too far advanced to be instructed by speech, and whose education will be completed by signs.
c) That each year a new speaking class be established, until all the old pupils taught by signs have completed their education.

Motion carried.

== Opposition ==
The American and British delegations were the only ones who opposed the use of oralism as a sole method of instruction, but were unsuccessful in their efforts to overturn the Milan resolutions. Reverend Thomas Gallaudet and his son Edward Miner Gallaudet, were among the protesters who railed against the oralist method being used in deaf education. Edward is noted as "defending the "Combined" system, and maintain[ing] that signs were the natural language of the deaf, as also the mother language of mankind."

Despite failing to have their positions ratified at the Congress, the Gallaudets ensured that deaf education in the US would not be completely converted to oralist methods. Manualism in deaf education survived oralism in part by the Gallaudets and others permitting and encouraging high school students in deaf institutes to use sign language and maintaining Gallaudet College (now Gallaudet University) as an institution of higher education that permitted the full usage of sign language.

In August 1880, one month before the Milan Conference, the National Association of the Deaf (NAD) was formed in the US and was dedicated from the outset to preserving American Sign Language and assisting the Deaf community in surviving an upswing of oralism that lasted several decades in the late 19th and early-to-mid 20th centuries.

== Legacy ==
At the culmination of the Conference, the London Times declared that "Deafness is Abolished".

The outcome of the conference saw the suppression of sign languages for almost a century.

=== Subsequent congresses ===
Later international congresses were held in the following cities: Brussels, Belgium. 1883. Chicago, Illinois, US, 1893. Paris, France. 1900. Liège, Belgium, 1905. Edinburgh, Scotland. 1907. London, England. 1925. West Trenton, New Jersey, US, 1933. Groningen, Holland. 1950. Manchester, England, 1958. Washington, DC, US, 1963. Stockholm, Sweden. 1970. Tokyo, Japan. 1975. Hamburg, Germany 1980. Manchester, England 1985. Rochester, USA. 1990. Tel Aviv, Israel. 1995. Sydney, Australia. 2000. Maastricht, Holland. 2005. Vancouver, Canada. 2010.

=== Repudiations ===
==== First repudiation (1980) ====
At the 15th International Congress on the Education of the Deaf (ICED) held in Hamburg, in then-West Germany in 1980, the first major step in repudiating the 1880 resolutions was set by a large group of attendees who, in an informal consensus, rejected the 1880 resolutions in practical and moral terms in deciding that the 1880 resolutions had no longer any appropriate standing. As explained by Richard G. Brill: "At the International Congress in Hamburg in 1980, [however,] the Milan resolutions were challenged head-on in major professional addresses at the opening of the congresses. It was recognized and accepted that resolutions concerning methodology were not appropriate at such international congresses because of the unlikelihood that the delegates fully represented the practices and philosophies of their home countries." Rather than seek to directly overturn the 1880 resolutions, the Congress put forward "recommendations" for informational purposes, including the following: "Recommended that this International Congress on Education of the Deaf, in convocation gathered at Hamburg, West Germany, in August 1980, affirms and declares that all deaf children have the right to flexible communication in the mode or combination of modes which best meets their individual needs." Sharkey and Hikins deemed this Recommendation, along with the others, as essentially constituting a repudiation of the 1880 Milan Congress' resolutions.

==== Final repudiation (2010) ====
Thirty years later, in July 2010 in Vancouver, Canada, the board of the 21st International Congress on the Education of the Deaf (ICED) formally voted to reject all of the 1880 Milan resolutions.

In 2023, the Congress was documented in the Memory of the World Register.

== See also ==
- Deaf
- Deaf culture
- Deaf education
- History of deaf education
- History of deaf education in the United States
- Deaf studies
- Sign language
- History of sign language
