= Deaf education =

Education of the deaf and hard of hearing

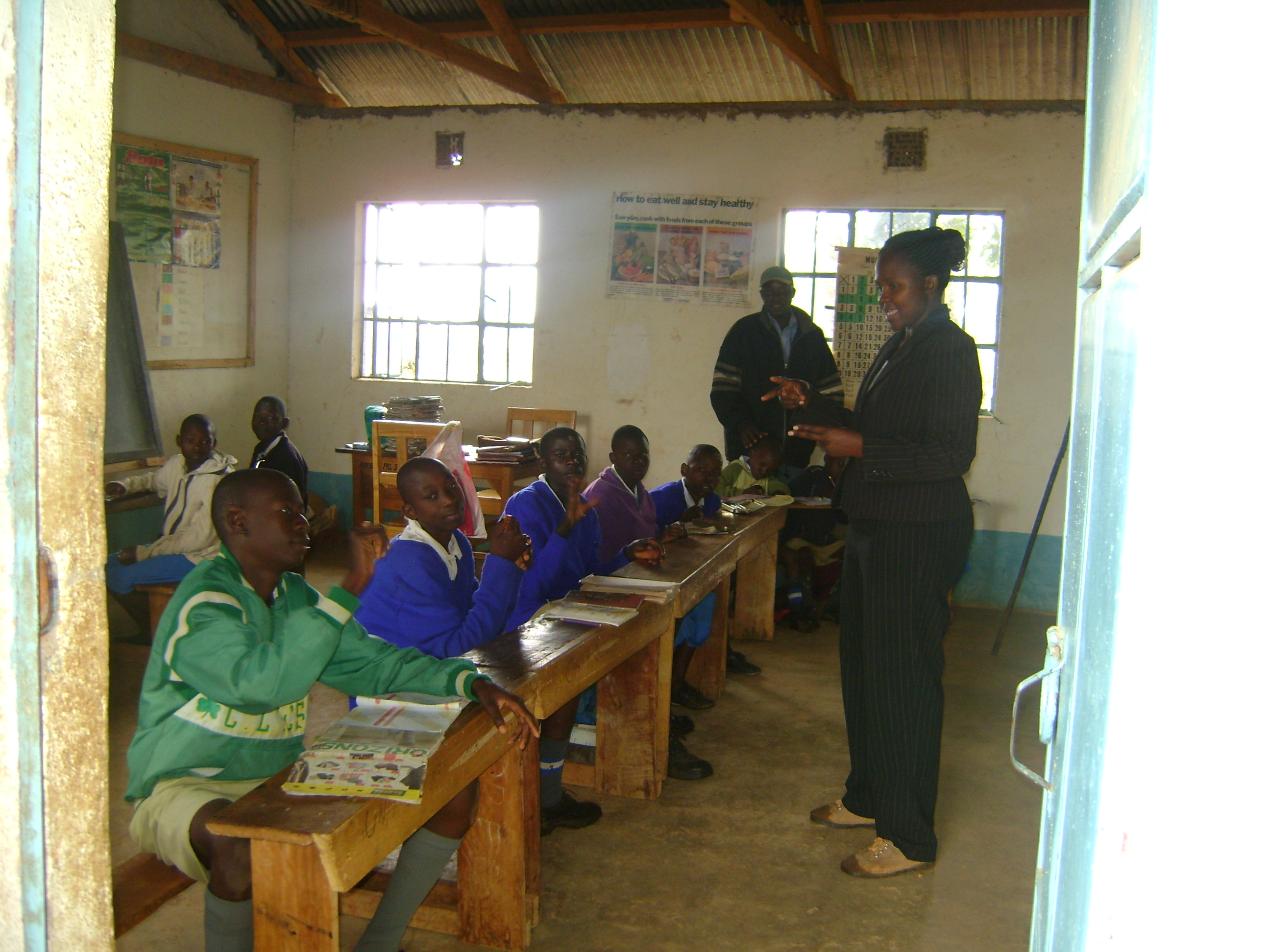
Class for deaf students in Kayieye, Kenya

Deaf education is the education of students with any degree of hearing loss or deafness. This may involve, but does not always, individually-planned, systematically-monitored teaching methods, adaptive materials, accessible settings, and other interventions designed to help students achieve a higher level of self-sufficiency and success in the school and community than they would achieve with a typical classroom education. There are different language modalities used in educational setting where students get varied communication methods. A number of countries focus on training teachers to teach deaf students with a variety of approaches and have organizations to support and advocate for deaf students.

== Identifying deaf students ==
Children may be identified as candidates for deaf education from their audiogram or medical history. Hearing loss is generally described as slight, mild, moderate, severe, or profound, depending upon how well a person can hear the intensities of frequencies. Of the children identified as deaf, only 5% are born to deaf parents. This percent of deaf students may have a linguistic advantage when entering the education system due to more extensive exposure to a first language.

In cases of congenital hearing loss (hearing loss from birth), parents can start to notice differences in their children's hearing as soon as newborn to three months old. If a child doesn't respond to sudden loud sounds, this could be an indication. As the baby begins to age to around four to eight months, they should turn their head towards where the sound is coming from. Around a year to 16 months, if they don't pronounce words correctly, or don't speak at all, this could also be an indication. All those are indications of congenital hearing loss, which means the child was born this way.

A child can also acquire hearing loss at a young age due to a middle ear infection, a serious head injury, exposure to loud noises over a long period, and many other causes. If this occurs, the same symptoms will occur as they do with congenital hearing loss. If this happens when a child is older, around toddler or preschool age, there are more signs to look for. Signs could include a child not replying when their name is called. The child may pronounce words differently than the rest of their peers. If the child turns up the TV incredibly high or sits very close, this could also be an indication. One of the biggest indications that a child may have hearing loss is they intensely focus on the person's lips and facial expressions to understand what they are saying when they are having a conversation with someone. If a child has these signs, getting a screening for hearing loss would be the next step.

As recently as the 1990s, many parents in the United States were unaware that their child was deaf until on average 2.5 to 3 years old, according to the U.S. National Institute of Health. Worse yet, many other children were not identified as having any hearing impairment until they reached five or six years of age. In 1993, the National Institutes of Health's Consensus Development Conference on Early Identification of Hearing Loss concluded previous risk-based assessment was not sufficient and that all infants should receive hearing screenings, ideally prior to hospital discharge postpartum. At the time of this decision, only 11 hospitals nationally were performing screening on 90 percent of babies born, according to the National Center for Hearing Assessment and Management. Since then, universal hearing screening has greatly improved early identification.

Language deprivation is defined as lack of access to language during a child's critical period for language exposure, which begins to taper off precisely around the age of five. Unlike any other population, the vast majority of Deaf and hard of hearing children are at risk of having this type of limited exposure to language in early childhood. Research on language deprivation and early childhood interventions to prevent language deprivation are burgeoning. Language Equality & Acquisition for Deaf Kids (LEAD-K), for example, is a national campaign that aims to ensure that D/HH children in the United States gain the early language foundation necessary to be kindergarten-ready.

For D/HH adolescents and adults who have passed the critical period for language acquisition and have experienced language deprivation, the consequences are far-reaching. Delayed age of acquisition of a first language has deleterious effects on all levels of language processing, ranging from syntactic, to lexical, to phonological difficulties, not to mention cognitive delays, mental health difficulties, lower quality of life, higher trauma, and limited health literacy. Additionally, delayed exposure to a fully accessible language (i.e. a natural sign language) in early life not only affects the ability to acquire such a sign language later in life, but "leads to incomplete acquisition of all subsequently learned languages". The impact of language deprivation is severe and must be considered in efforts toward early identification of deaf and hard of hearing children as well as intervention.

== Individual needs ==
Deaf education programs must be customized to each student's needs, and deaf educators provide a continuum of services to deaf students based on individual needs. For instance, if a student is in a mainstream class, a note taker or interpreter might be an accommodation provided in their education plan. In the United States, Canada, and the UK, education professionals use the acronym IEP when referring to a student's individualized education plan.

== Educational philosophies ==
There are a variety of educational philosophies that differ in their views both regarding language use and goals for deaf and hard-of-hearing students.

=== Bilingual-bicultural education ===
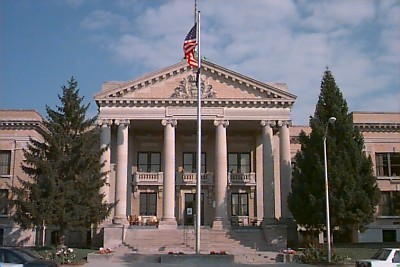
Alumni Hall, the middle and high schools at the Indiana School for the Deaf (a bilingual-bicultural school)

(Variations: bilingual education, dual language) In this philosophy, deafness is approached as a cultural, not a medical, issue (see models of deafness). In a bilingual-bicultural program, deaf children learn sign language such as American Sign Language (ASL) as a first language, followed by a written or spoken language such as English as a second language. Bilingual-bicultural programs consider spoken or written language and sign language equal languages, helping children develop age-appropriate fluency in both. The bilingual-bicultural philosophy states that since deaf children learn visually, rather than by ear, education should be conducted in a visual language. To promote students' accuracy and fluency in either language, sign language and spoken language are not used simultaneously, because natural sign languages, such as American Sign Language (ASL), possess their own phonological system (with visual phonemes), morphology, and syntactic structure that differs greatly from that of spoken languages. In addition to bilingualism, this philosophy also emphasizes mastery of two cultures, both Deaf culture and hearing culture.

Proponents of this philosophy emphasize the need for deaf and hard-of-hearing students to have exposure to a fully accessible language (i.e. a sign language) from a young age for optimal cognitive development. Supporters believe that, due to the widely recognized variability in cochlear implant and hearing aid outcomes, sign language access is critical to ensure that deaf and hard-of-hearing children do not experience language deprivation, which has significant effects on mental health, socioemotional development, language fluency, and educational outcomes, among other factors.

Critics of this philosophy believe that without a strong emphasis on spoken communication, this philosophy may lead to students being unable to integrate into the typically-hearing world.

=== Auditory-oral and auditory-verbal education ===
In this philosophy, deafness is approached as a medical, not a cultural, issue (see models of deafness). There are two main educational philosophies for deaf and hard-of-hearing students based on an emphasis on auditory and verbal skills. The names of these philosophies are sometimes used interchangeably, but the methods primarily used in each philosophy are distinct.

==== Oralism ====
Oralism is a philosophy that the education of deaf students should be conducted through and should promote the use of spoken language. This philosophy utilizes a variety of approaches, including lip reading and speech training. Oralism was popularized in the late 1800s and largely enforced throughout Europe and North America, following the Second International Congress on Education of the Deaf in 1880. Oralism was established as an alternative to manual (sign language) education and stands in opposition to the use of sign language in the education of deaf and hard of hearing students.

==== Total Communication ====
Total Communication is an educational philosophy for deaf and hard of hearing students which encourages the use and combination of a variety of communication means, including listening, lipreading, speech, formal sign languages, artificial sign systems (or manually coded language), gestures, fingerspelling, and body language. The goal of the Total Communication philosophy is to optimize communication skills using a combination of means that are most effective for each individual child, leading to implementations of this philosophy that greatly differ from one to the next.

Whereas the Bilingual-Bicultural philosophy emphasizes the separation of spoken and signed languages, the Total Communication philosophy allows simultaneous use of signed and spoken languages. It also allows the use of artificial signed systems, which are based on the grammar and syntax of spoken language and stand in opposition to formal sign languages, which have their own distinct grammar and syntactic rules.

Proponents of this philosophy believe that flexibility in communication strategies is critical for the success of deaf and hard of hearing children and that no one approach is effective for the majority of these children. Total Communication emphasizes taking the strengths and needs of individual children into account and believes that mixed communication strategies that cater to these strengths lead to optimal outcomes.

Critics of this philosophy argue that using multiple modalities (sign language and/or sign systems alongside spoken language, also known as simultaneous communication) is problematic, because it reduces the linguistic quality of both languages and therefore does not constitute full language exposure for deaf and hard-of-hearing children.

== Educational settings ==
=== Specialized settings ===
==== Signing schools (Variation: Deaf institute, State School for the Deaf, manual school) ====
Students are taught through sign language, and instruction is designed to allow children to develop age-appropriate fluency in two languages: a signed language and a written language. Many bilingual-bicultural schools have dormitories; students may commute to school or stay in a dormitory as part of a residential program (see boarding school), visiting their families on weekends, holidays, and school vacations. Additional supports include speech-language pathology (SLP) services and assistive listening devices (ALDs) such as hearing aids and Cochlear implants.

Signing schools often adopt a Bilingual-Bicultural philosophy in which mastery of both a signed and a written language are equally prioritized, with supports provided for students who also wish to gain fluency in spoken language. Some signing schools utilize a Total Communication philosophy.

Examples of Bilingual-Bicultural K-12 programs in the United States include Texas School for the Deaf, California School for the Deaf, Fremont and The Learning Center for the Deaf. Bilingual-bicultural colleges and universities include Gallaudet University and National Technical Institute for the Deaf (NTID).

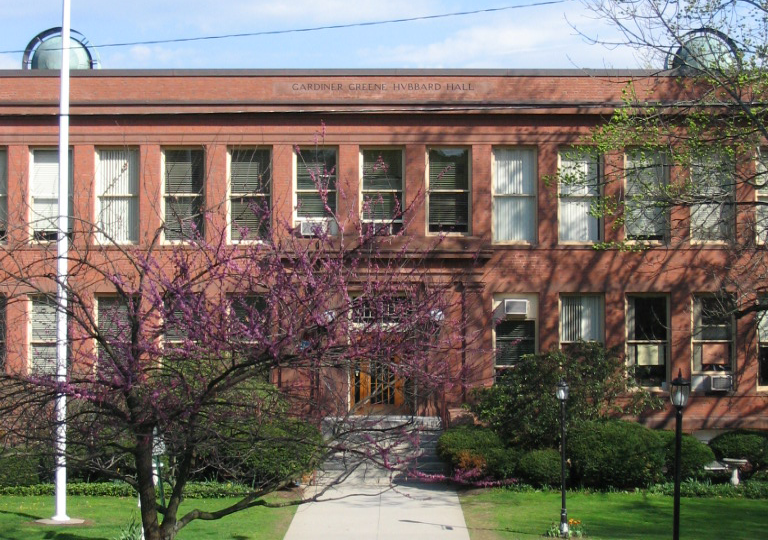
Hubbard Hall is the main building on the Northampton campus of Clarke Schools for Hearing and Speech, an oral school.

==== Oral schools ====
Students are taught through spoken language and instruction is designed to allow children to develop age-appropriate written and spoken fluency in the spoken language of their country. Deaf and hard-of-hearing students in such settings are taught to listen and talk through the use of assistive listening devices (ALDs) such as hearing aids, cochlear implants, or frequency modulation (FM) systems. Additional supports include lipreading and speech therapy.

Oral schools adhere to an auditory/verbal philosophy (either oralism or listening and spoken language) in which mastery of spoken language is prioritized.

Examples of auditory/verbal K-12 programs in the United States include Central Institute for the Deaf, Clarke Schools for Hearing and Speech, Northern Voices, and Memphis Oral School for the Deaf.

=== Mainstream settings ===
==== General education schools ====
Students are taught through spoken language in a public or private school where they join a class of predominantly (if not exclusively) typically-hearing peers. In this setting, deaf students can utilize a variety of supports including, but not limited to, sign language interpreters, amplification, assistive hearing technology (e.g., hearing aids, Cochlear implants), speech-to-text closed captioning, and note-taking services.

==== Self-contained classrooms ====
Students are taught in a self-contained classroom within a public or private general education school. Educational philosophies and languages of instruction vary by individual school and district. In self-contained classrooms, deaf and hard-of-hearing students may be placed exclusively with other deaf and hard-of-hearing peers or with other special education students.

Some deaf children exclusively attend a mainstream program; others join select mainstream classes for part of their day. Students may receive accommodations, such as itinerant teachers, interpreters, assistive technology, note-takers and aides.

Some self-contained classrooms include both hearing and deaf/hard-of-hearing students and often use a mix of signed and spoken language. These are known as co-enrollment programs.

=== Pros and cons of different education settings ===
Residential schools for the Deaf provide more opportunities for socialization and identification with the Deaf community and better access to school curriculum. Mainstreaming in general education settings provides students with the opportunity to socialize with their hearing peers and learn skills to adapt to environments dominated by hearing people. Deaf advocate Ahmed Khalifa has shared how many people believe that general education settings better prepare Deaf students for the "real" or hearing world.

Khalifa has expressed concerns about the standardization of curriculum in certain residential schools for the Deaf. Deaf students often report learning more difficult material in general education settings than in residential schools for the Deaf, and they report better post-secondary educational and vocational opportunities.

There is an increasing demand for Deaf students to be included in general education settings. However, in general education settings, Deaf students tend to perform worse than their hearing peers academically due to miscommunications that occur through third-person sign language interpreting. In addition to increasing miscommunication, third-person sign language interpreting in general education settings is economically inefficient and in some cases, is not possible due to a lack of school resources. Deaf schools eliminate the need for third-person interpreting, and thus, reduce the probability of miscommunication between teachers and Deaf students. Deaf schools also provide the opportunity for Deaf students to learn sign language, which can improve their scholastic and social-emotional capability. Identification with the Deaf community and the ability to communicate with both hearing peers and Deaf peers positively predict self-esteem outcomes in Deaf students.

== History ==
=== France ===
Charles-Michel de l'Épée pioneered deaf education in France. He did charitable work for the poor, and on one trip into the Paris slums saw two young, deaf sisters who communicated with a sign language. Épée then decided to dedicate himself to the education of the deaf, and founded a school in 1760. In line with the philosophy of the time (see French Enlightenment), Épée believed that deaf people were capable of language and developed a system of teaching French and religion. During the early 1760s his shelter became the Institut National de Jeunes Sourds de Paris, the world's first public school for deaf children.

=== Great Britain ===
John Bulwer (1606–1656), an English physician, wrote five works on bodily communication (particularly gestures). He was the first person in England to propose educating deaf people, outlining plans for an academy in Philocophus and The Dumbe mans academie.

The grandson of Sir John Popham, Alexander, was born in 1650. He was either deaf at birth, or became so before acquiring speech. Two eminent men came to his home at Littlecote House to teach him to talk: John Wallis, mathematician and cryptographer, and William Holder, music theorist.

The first British school for teaching the deaf to speak and read was Thomas Braidwood's Academy for the Deaf and Dumb in Edinburgh, established during the 1760s, the time of the Scottish Enlightenment. The school moved to London in 1783. Braidwood used an early form of sign language: the combined system, forerunner of British Sign Language. Under the management of Braidwood's nephew the school expanded, encouraging the establishment of an Institution for the Instruction of the Deaf and Dumb in Edgbaston in 1814 and others in Liverpool, Doncaster. Edinburgh, Exeter, and Manchester (now the Seashell Trust).

Britain's first free school for deaf pupils, the London Asylum for the Deaf and Dumb, was set up in 1792 by three men: Henry Thornton, MP, abolitionist, and reformer; Rev John Townsend, educator and Independent minister; and Henry Cox Mason, rector of Bermondsey.

In his ministerial relation, Mr. Townsend became acquainted with a lady, whose son was deaf and dumb, and who had been a pupil of Mr. Braidwood's almost ten years. The youth evinced an intellectual capacity which caused delight and surprise to the good pastor, who was astonished at the facility and accuracy, with which ideas were received and communicated. Mrs. C, the lady referred to, sympathising with those mothers whose circumstances precluded their incurring the expense of 1500 £, (which was the sum paid by herself,) pleaded the cause of those afflicted and destitute outcasts of society, until Mr. T. entered into her feelings of commiseration, and decided with her on the necessity and practicability of having a charitable Institution for the deaf and dumb children of the poor. (Memoirs pp. 37–38).

Braidwood's nephew Joseph Watson offered himself as tutor, and eventually became headmaster; he wrote On the Education of the Deaf and Dumb (1809). The institute's name and location changed more than once, and for most of the nineteenth century it occupied a purpose-built boarding school on the Old Kent Road, Southwark in Inner London; it moved to the seaside at Margate, where it was known as the Royal School for Deaf Children Margate, finally closing in 2015.

The Elementary Education (Blind and Deaf Children) Act 1893 set the compulsory age for the admission of deaf children in boarding schools at seven years, and the leaving age at sixteen. This was at odds with the compulsory age of admission for both hearing and blind children at five years old, and a school leaving age of fourteen for hearing children. In 1937, a new law lowered the age of admission of children attending schools for the deaf from seven years to five years.

In the mid-1960s the Inner London Education Authority set up two primary schools for deaf children, Frank Barnes School in North London and Grove House School in South London. They also opened Oak Lodge Secondary School in Wandsworth, South London, which was one of a few state boarding schools.

British Sign Language was recognised in 2003.

=== Australia ===
In Australia, about one in six citizens have hearing loss. Unlike deaf education in the United States, over half of Australian deaf students are taught in hearing schools. Most of these students will be taught primarily in English; however, there are also bilingual programs.

It is frequent that deaf students in hearing schools are taught sign language one-on-one, meaning they lack social interaction with their peers. Being taken out of classes and recess for these lessons decreases their time with other students. There are also fewer interpreters available than needed, meaning students immersed in hearing schools sometimes have to rely on their own knowledge to make it through a class.

The most common language taught by teachers of the deaf in signing schools is Australasian Signed English. Most deaf children will be taught standardized English in hearing schools. Schools that teach Auslan, or Australian Sign Language, are usually only specialized schools for the deaf, which are rare. Auslan can also be difficult to learn and reproduce with others since it is common that teachers of Auslan will pass on an outdated version of the language. This includes signs that may no longer be used or signs that have been redeveloped.

A group known as Deaf Australia is attempting to address the complex issues of deaf education and representation in their country. They believe in the idea that deaf children need to be taught both Auslan and English, and not just have access to one or the other. Their statistics state that deaf students are usually "two standard deviations outside of the average" in terms of educational performance, and their goal as an organization is to change this.

The Gonski report, led by David Gonski and Julia Gillard, made the argument that the Australian government did not have a stable, concise approach to funding for schools. This report was the basis for the National Plan for School Improvement of 2014 whose mission was to make sure all Australian students, regardless of background or disability, would be receiving a "world-class education". The National Plan was the beginning of more opportunities for deaf students to have a specialized, enriching education similar to that of hearing students.

From the National Plan and statistics about Australian disability education came the National Disability Strategy of 2012. The strategy highlights a ten-year plan developed by the National People with Disabilities and Carer Council to "[improve] life for Australians with disability". The plan was to take place from 2011 to 2020 with three main phases: 1) gathering statistics about disability education and life in Australia, 2) prioritizing certain actions based on gathered statistics and implement them into Australian government/daily life and 3) check on progress of implemented actions and make sure the plan is on track. The National Disability Strategy is considered in Australia to be a "historic milestone" due to it being the first time all aspects of Australian government and society has come together to focus on improving the lives of disabled citizens.

=== Germany ===
In 1778, Samuel Heinicke opened the first public school for the deaf in Leipzig, Germany. Heinicke believed lipreading to be the best method of teaching and opposed the dependence on sign language in his school. His ideology was that lipreading made his students understand the language as it was spoken and used in society. This method of teaching became normalized among schools for the deaf and hard of hearing in Germany.

The government and school system suggests parents of children with hearing loss use the oral method at home, to stimulate and create excitement in learning. By 1975 there were 73 schools for the hearing impaired in West Germany, most being state residential schools, with a few private religious schools. In classrooms, gestures and signing were not allowed, children had to closely watch their teachers' lips as vocabulary and background information is explained. Children could easily move throughout programs that best suited their learning needs; their placement typically based on their hearing ability. Integrated programs had been unsuccessful except in classes like sports, workshop, and art, but contact between the deaf and mainstream schools is encouraged. Outside of the classroom students are free to communicate however they chose, which tends to be a manual communication.

In recent years, deaf schools have begun to accept a bilingual approach to education. 90% of deaf institutions still have an oralist approach, but about 60% of those schools use a combined manual method of teaching.

=== United States ===
Deaf education in the United States began during the early 1800s, when the Cobbs School (an oral school) was established by William Bolling and John Braidwood and the Connecticut Asylum for the Deaf and Dumb (a manual school) was established by Thomas Hopkins Gallaudet and Laurent Clerc. When the Cobbs School closed in 1816, the manual method (which used American Sign Language) became common in deaf schools for most of the rest of the century. During the late 1800s schools began using the oral method, which only allowed the use of speech (in contrast to the manual method previously in place). The oral method was used for many years, until sign-language instruction gradually returned to deaf education.

=== Nigeria ===
Before the government stepped in, those with special needs were looked after by different religious or voluntary groups in the country, such as the School for the Blind of Gindiri and the Wesley School for the Deaf in Lagos.

The Wesley School for the Deaf is one of the oldest schools for the Deaf in Nigeria, being founded in 1958. The Wesley School for the Deaf is still teaching the Deaf in Surulere, Lagos, Nigeria, with the help of the Wesley Methodist mission and the state government. The oldest school is the Alderstown School for the Deaf, which was founded in 1954.

The expansion of deaf education in Nigeria is largely credited to Andrew Foster, the first black graduate of Gallaudet University. Foster had previously founded a school for the deaf in Ghana. While identifying deaf individuals he offered to send them to his school in Ghana. Those selected would complete a certification course to get them ready to become an administrator, teacher, or office workers for the schools which Foster established in Nigeria.

Foster established three schools in Nigeria: Kaduna in northern Nigeria, Enugu in eastern Nigeria, and lastly Ibadan in western Nigeria. The schools he established have since closed down or merged into other schools, but his legacy is still remembered.

Public special education began to change in 1975 though. The National Policy on Education recognized Special Education and was passed in 1977 and revised in 1981 and 2015. The policy has a section devoted to special need education. The Blueprint on Education of the Handicapped in Nigeria started in 1989, which established several schools, like School for the Deaf Akure, catering especially to those with special education needs. The 2006 national census puts the figure of persons with disability in Nigeria at 3,253,169, with about 39 per cent of school age.

Nigeria uses a 6–3–3–4 educational system, standing for six years of primary education, three years in junior primary school, three years of senior secondary school, and four years of higher education. In theory the 6–3–3–4 system should allow for the deaf and special needs to receive an education; however, in practice service for the deaf and special needs are well behind other countries.

=== Andrew Foster ===
Andrew Jackson Foster is known as the "Father of Deaf Education" in Africa where he founded 32 schools for the Deaf across 13 African nations. He was the first African American graduate of Gallaudet University with a degree in education in 1954. In 1956, he received his master's degree in Deaf education at Michigan State Normal College and then a second master's in Christian missions at Seattle Pacific College, respectively. Foster founded the Christian Missions for Deaf Africans and led to the establishment of Ghana Mission School for the Deaf in Accra, Ghana. Foster's work continued for the next three decades, expanding all over the continent. In 1987, en route to Kenya, Foster died in a plane crash. In 2004, Gallaudet University named an auditorium in recognition of Foster's role with a bust displayed upfront.

== Issues ==
Two general methods of deaf education are manualism and oralism. Manualism is instruction using sign language, and oralism uses spoken language. Although controversy has existed since the early eighteenth century about which method is more effective, many deaf-educational facilities attempt to integrate both approaches. The National Association of the Deaf advocates a bilingual approach, to best support deaf students in their education.

There are also disputes over which form of schooling is best for children who are deaf. Some say that mainstream schooling with other non-deaf students is the best because it prepares students for the real world where there is a mix of both hearing and deaf people. While others say that sending their child to a deaf school is the better option because it surrounds their child with other students who are like them. Neither is better than the other and it is important to keep in mind that what is best for one child probably will not be the same for another.

The issues surrounding the education of deaf and hard of hearing students are unique and complex. Students must have access to full communication in the educational setting so they can learn and thrive. Federal and state education laws also play a role in ensuring that deaf and hard-of-hearing students receive a quality education.

== National approaches ==
=== United States ===
Some deaf students receive an individualized education program (IEP) outlining how the school will meet the student's individual needs. The Individuals with Disabilities Education Act (IDEA) requires that students with special needs be provided with Free Appropriate Public Education in the least restrictive environment appropriate to the student's needs. Government-run schools provide deaf education in varying degrees, from the least-restrictive setting (full inclusion) to the most restrictive (segregation in a deaf school). Education offered by the school must be appropriate to the student's individual needs; however, schools are not required to maximize the student's potential or provide the best possible services. Like most developed countries, American schools are required to provide medical services (such as speech therapy) if the student needs those services. As technology improves, more solutions become available in classrooms. Things such as FM systems have been put into many schools. An FM system has two parts: the first is a microphone that the teacher wears around their neck while teaching. There are two ways the system is set up for the child. First, the FM radio waves can be directly set up with the child's hearing aid or cochlear implant, so the sound is amplified only to the particular child. The second is called a sound field. The sound field uses special speakers put strategically throughout the classroom. This increases sound to a whole classroom instead of just one student.

=== Canada ===
Canada upholds and recognizes the UN Convention on the Rights of Persons with Disabilities stating that all Deaf people have the right to be educated in sign language. The Canadian Association of the Deaf's doctrine is the education of a child in a language that best fits them, and then the addition of a second language, like English or French, once a primary form of communication has been established.

=== Nepal ===
Deaf children in Nepal have the right to free, qualified education in line with provisions of the UN Convention on the Rights of Persons with Disabilities (UNCRPD). However, education in a school for the deaf is limited to 13 dedicated schools for the deaf and a slightly higher number of deaf resource classes in regular schools. All schools and classes are bilingual, with Nepali Sign Language and written Nepali the media of instruction.

== Teacher training ==
Deaf education teacher training programs generally focus on one of the three major philosophies: bilingual (sign language), oral (listening and spoken language), or total (combination of oral and bilingual). Teachers learn through a combination of academic coursework and student teaching experiences with children who are deaf or hard of hearing. Academic preparation may include a combination of education, special education, audiology, speech-language pathology, sign language, Deaf studies, and Deaf culture, with specific content guided by the philosophy, specific program degree requirements, and (if applicable) state teacher certification/licensure requirements.

=== Canada ===
- George Brown College Toronto
- Nova Scotia Community College
- Red River College
- University of Alberta
- Vancouver Community College
- York University

=== Ireland ===
- Trinity College Dublin

=== United States ===
- Bachelor's program:
  - Boston University
  - Gallaudet University
  - Rochester Institute of Technology
- Master's program:
  - Washington University in St. Louis
  - Boston University
  - National Center on Deafness, California State University, Northridge, Northridge, California
- Doctoral program:
  - Gallaudet University Washington, D.C.

=== United Kingdom ===
- University of Central Lancashire, Lancashire, England
- University of Bristol, Bristol
- University of Edinburgh Edinburgh
- University of Wolverhampton

=== New Zealand ===
- Auckland University of Technology
- Victoria University of Wellington

=== The Netherlands ===
- HU University of Applied Sciences Utrecht
- Visual Language, Signs and Gestures, Max Planck Institute for Psycholinguistics, Nijmegen

== Deaf education associations ==
Philippines
- International Deaf Education Association (IDEA)
Europe
- European Federation of Associations of Teachers of the Deaf (FEAPDA)
- European Union of the Deaf
United States

- Alexander Graham Bell Association for the Deaf and Hard of Hearing
  - Volta Bureau
- American Society for Deaf Children (ASDC)
- Conference of Educational Administrators of Schools and Programs for the Deaf (CEASD)
- National Association of the Deaf (United States)
- National Deaf Education Conference

Canada
- Canadian Association of the Deaf
United Kingdom

- British Association of Teachers of the Deaf (BATOD)
- British Deaf Association (BDA)

== See also ==
- Category:Deaf universities and colleges
- Category:Schools for the deaf
- History of institutions for deaf education
- Deaf culture
- Deaf studies
- History of sign language
- Language exposure for deaf children
- Second International Congress on Education of the Deaf
- Signing Exact English
- Blind education
- Special education
- American Annals of the Deaf
- Sign Language
