= Manualism =

Method of educating deaf students through the use of sign language

Manualism, also known as the French Method, is a method of education of deaf students using sign language within the classroom. Manualism arose in the late 18th century with the advent of free public schools for the deaf in Europe. These teaching methods were brought over to the United States where the first school for the deaf was established in 1817. Today manualism methods are used in conjunction with oralism methods in the majority of American deaf schools.

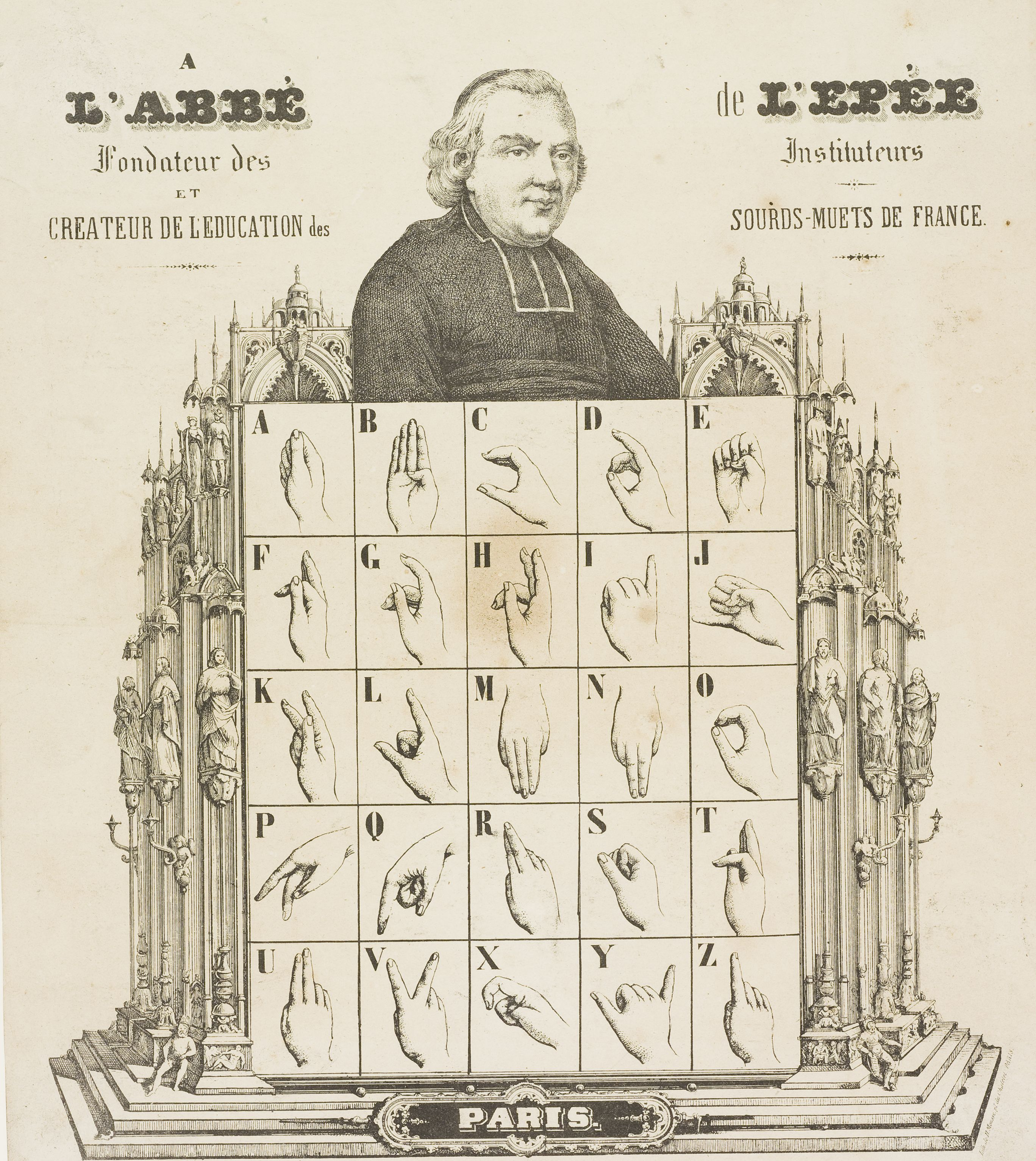
Abbe de l’Épée, creator of the first manual schools

== Origins ==
The first manual schools were in Paris, France. Abbe de l’Épée, a Catholic priest, encountered two teenage deaf girls while he visited a family in the poor part of the city. He decided to take it upon himself to continue to educate them after their previous teacher, a priest, had died. L'Épée was the first figure to favour using the written, rather than the spoken word in the education of deaf people, and he set about to learn the signed language of his students. He invented a technique called "methodical signing" from the signs the girls already used, with the combination of methods influenced by the writings of Johann Konrad Ammann and Juan Pablo Bonet. He created a one-hand manual alphabet to be able to fingerspell French words.

In 1755, L’Épée opened a free national school for the deaf in his home, on 14 Rue de Moulins (now 23 Rue Thérèse), Paris. After his death in 1789, Abbé Roch-Ambroise Cucurron Sicard took over as head of the school; it was renamed Institut National de Jeunes Sourds de Paris. The school received monetary support from individuals and grants from King Louis XVI.

=== Early deaf education in America ===
Laurent Clerc, a graduate from the school and pupil of l’Épée and Sicard, returned to the school as a teacher. He was teaching there in 1816 when Thomas Hopkins Gallaudet visited. Gallaudet met nine-year-old Alice Cogswell who knew no form of communication system. He learned of Sicard's theories and started tutoring Alice. Gallaudet traveled to Europe in May 1815 and attended demonstrations in France led by Sicard, Clerc, and Massieu. He returned in March 1816 and persuaded Clerc to return with him to the United States.

Back in the US, they searched for funds and public support. Together, they established the first deaf school in the United States on April 15, 1817, in Hartford, Connecticut; it was named the Connecticut Asylum for the Education and Instruction of Deaf and Dumb Persons. The school taught in French Sign Language and a version of de l’Épée's methodical sign taught by Clerc and Thomas Hopkins Gallaudet. The students attending the school had some knowledge of an indigenous sign language used in Martha's Vineyard, Massachusetts. Out of the blend of Martha's Vineyard Sign Language and French Sign Language, emerged American Sign Language.

== Decline ==
Manual education remained the primary method to educate deaf people until the 1860s. People then begin to subscribe to more oralist methods of education: lip reading and speech training. In 1867, the first private oral school opened in New York City. The oral movement took off in full swing at the Milan Conference of 1880 in which Alexander Graham Bell declared oral methods superior to manual methods. After the conference, schools all around Europe and the United States switched to using speech and lipreading, banning all sign language from the classroom. The deaf community was left in what some call the "dark ages".

== Revival ==
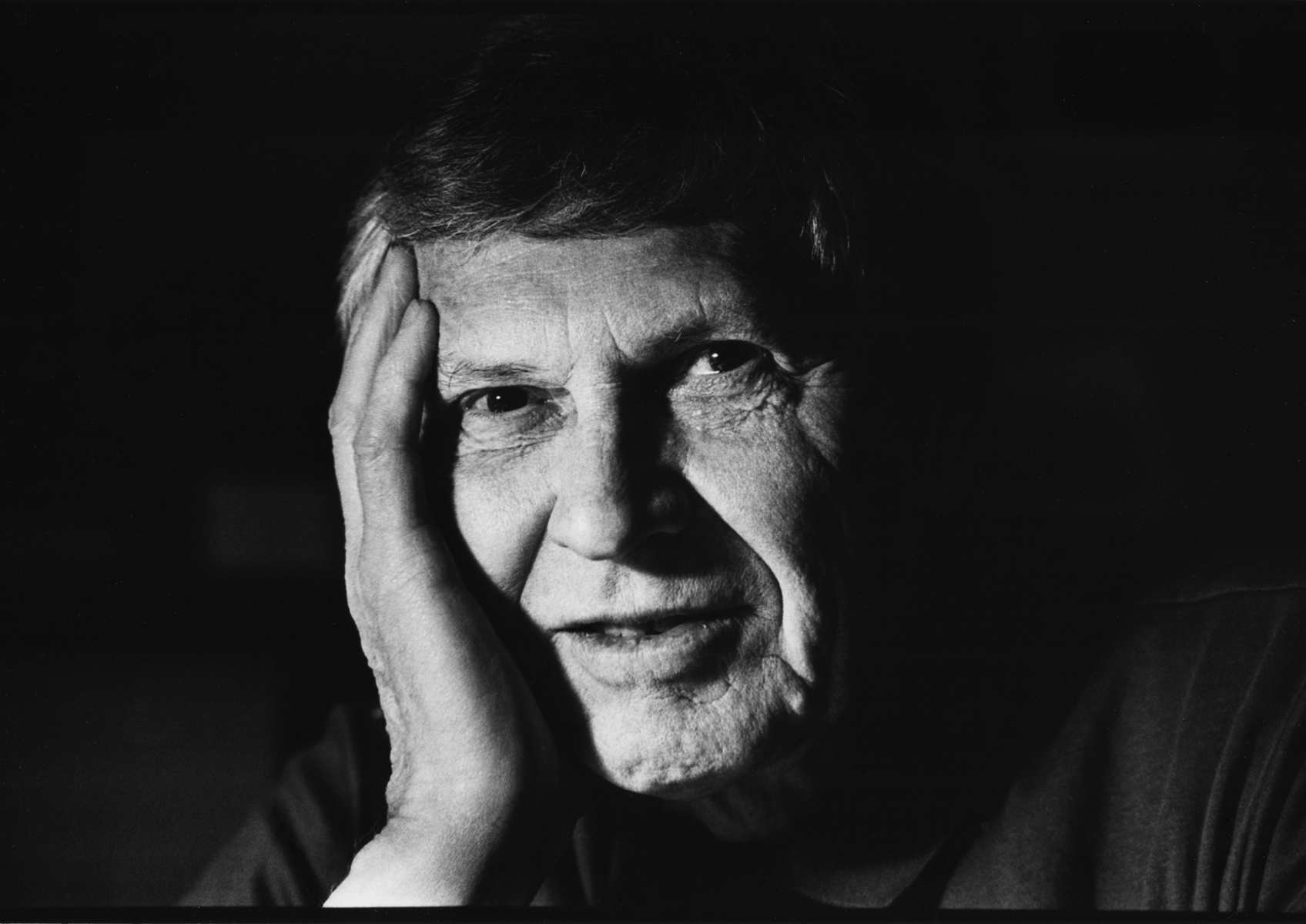
William Stokoe

While working at Gallaudet University in the 1960s, William Stokoe felt that American Sign Language was a language in its own right, with its own independent syntax and grammar. Stokoe classified the language into five parts which included: handshapes, orientation, location, movement, and facial expression in which much of the meaning of the sign is clarified as well as the grammar of the sentence expressed. Some sign languages, such as American Sign Language, have been promoted as the traditional way of communication for deaf people. Manualism is combined with oralism as the contemporary technique for the education of deaf students.

== See also ==
- Manualism and oralism
- Deaf culture
- History of sign language
- Deaf education
- Oralism
