= Alderstown School for the Deaf =

Specialist primary school in Nigeria

- Warri, Delta; Nigeria

Information
- Established: 1954; 72 years ago

The Alderstown School for the Deaf (founded in 1954) is a special basic education institution located on Skinn Road in Warri, Delta State, Nigeria. It is a specialist primary school for children aged 4–12, or older, who are deaf or have hearing and speech difficulties.

== Reconstruction ==
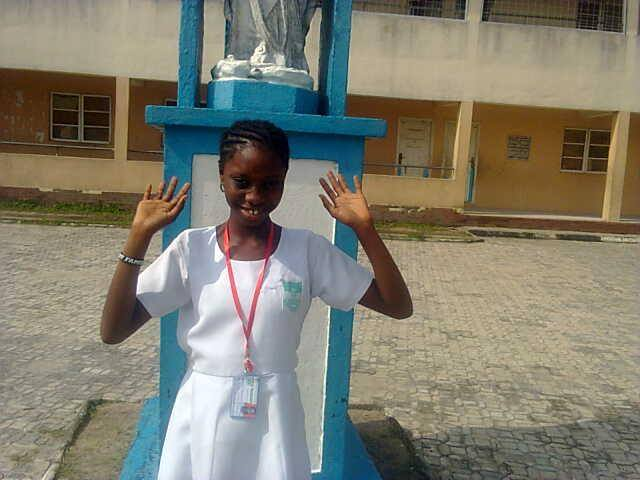
A pupil in front of Alderstown School for the Deaf

During Governor Emmanuel Uduaghan's administration, the Delta State Government embarked on a reconstruction project in the school. The school, which was described as "one of the most deplorable and desecrated schools in the heart of Warri", was given a facelift under Uduaghan's administration.

== Education ==
- Cavagina Primary School
