= Clarke Schools for Hearing and Speech =

School in Massachusetts, United States

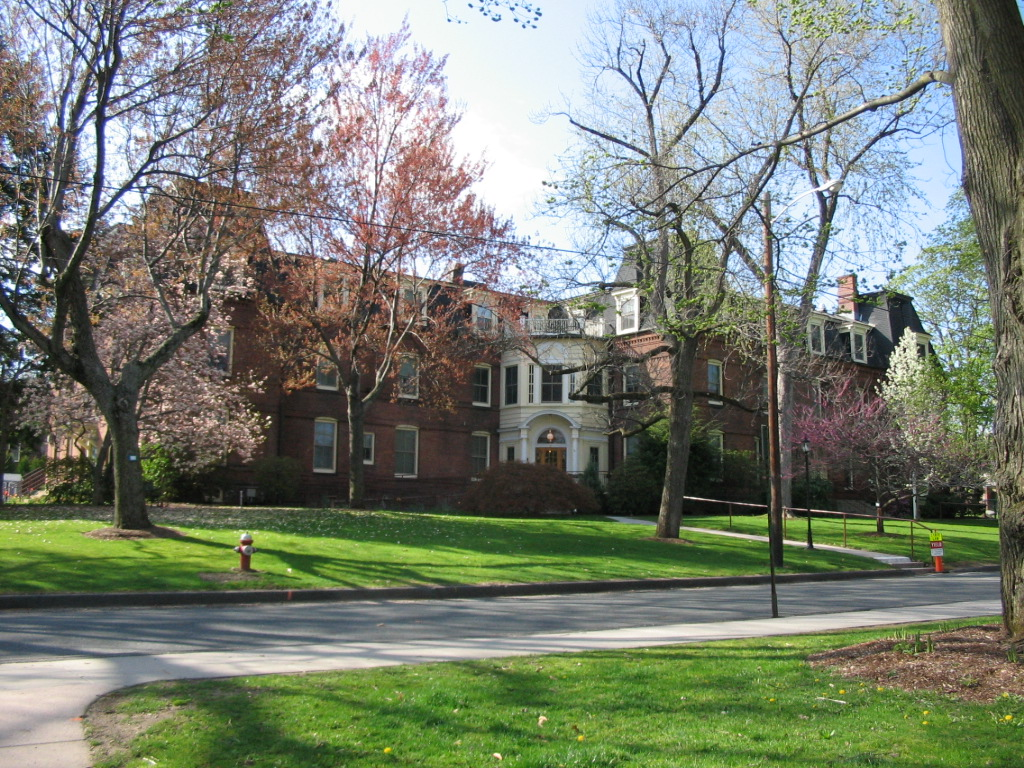

Location
- 45 Round Hill Road; Northampton, Massachusetts 01060; United States; 42°19′21″N 72°38′23″W

Information
- Former name: Clarke School for the Deaf
- Type: Nonprofit organization teaching children who are deaf or hard of hearing to listen and speak
- Established: 1867
- President: Bruce Skyer
- Staff: More than 150 staff members
- Faculty: More than 30 faculty members
- Grades: preschool through high school
- Enrollment: 1,000 annually
- Campuses: Clark Boston; Clark Florida; Clark New York; Clark Northampton; Clark Pennsylvania
- Mascot: Cougars
- Website: clarkeschools.org

Clarke Schools for Hearing and Speech (formerly Clarke School for the Deaf) is a national nonprofit organization that specializes in educating children who are deaf or hard of hearing using listening and spoken language (oralism) through the assistance of hearing technology such as hearing aids and cochlear implants. Clarke's five campuses serve more than 1,000 students annually in Canton, Massachusetts, Jacksonville, Florida, New York City, Northampton, Massachusetts, and Philadelphia, Pennsylvania. Clarke is the first and largest organization of its kind in the U.S. Its Northampton campus was listed on the National Register of Historic Places in 2022.

== History ==
Clarke School for the Deaf was founded in 1867 in Northampton, Massachusetts, as the first permanent oral school for the deaf in the United States. It became the heart of the oralist movement in the United States.

=== 21st century ===
In the first quarter of 2010, Clarke announced the new name from Clarke School for the Deaf to Clarke Schools for Hearing and Speech. While Clarke Northampton made the decision to end their residential and mainstream programs in 2024, Clarke Boston, Clarke Florida, Clarke New York, and Clarke Philadelphia all continue to operate their schools for the deaf.

In the present day, Clarke Schools for Hearing and Speech operates from five locations:

- Clarke Boston in Canton, Massachusetts
- Clarke Florida in Jacksonville, Florida
- Clarke New York in New York City
- Clarke Northampton in Northampton, Massachusetts
- Clarke Pennsylvania in Philadelphia

== Media ==
In 2007, Clarke School was featured in the PBS documentary Through Deaf Eyes produced by Larry Hott. The documentary depicted deafness and Deaf culture in the United States and the choices parents face between sign language and oral language.

== Abuse ==
Clarke School admitted and apologized for the extreme abuse carried out against Deaf students back when the school had a residential program. Molestations were reported, Jewish students were forced to attend church, and teachers used methods of corporal punishment that were considered extreme even by the standards of the time on students whose speech did not satisfy their hearing teachers. Clarke School has since apologized for the abuse.

== Notable people ==
- Grace Coolidge (1879–1957), First lady of the United States, teacher
- Ella Seaver Owen (1852–1910), artist, teacher
- Caroline Yale (1848–1933), director, inventor, friend of Grace Coolidge
