= Itinerant teacher =

Traveling schoolteacher

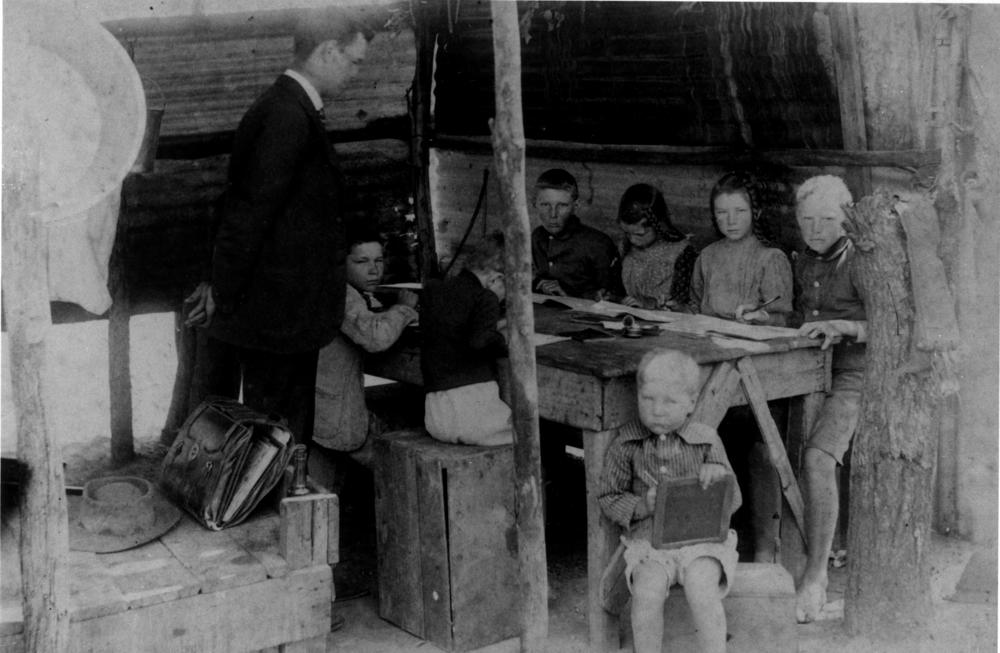
An itinerant teacher teaching in a bush school in Queensland

Itinerant teachers (also called "visiting" or "peripatetic" teachers) are traveling schoolteachers. They are sometimes specialized to work in the trades, healthcare, or the field of special education, sometimes providing individual tutoring.

Historically, the term has also been used to describe traveling teachers in regions without formal schools, as well as the sophists of Ancient Greece, the disciples of Jesus of Nazareth, and even Jesus of Nazareth himself. Itinerant lecturers include James Ferguson.
