= History of deaf education =

The Deaf community over time has worked to improve the educational system for those who are Deaf and hard of hearing. The history of Deaf education dates back to ancient Egypt where the deaf were respected and revered. In contrast, those who were deaf in ancient Greece were considered a burden to society and put to death. The educational aspects of the deaf community has evolved tremendously and still continues to grow as the science of linguistics, educational research, new technologies, and laws, on local, national, and international levels are steadily being introduced. Strategies, however, remain controversial.

== Ancient Egypt ==
During the BC era, the disabled were not harmed or killed by the Egyptians despite the fact that they had birth defects. This is because the Egyptians lived by a philanthropic way of life. Many of the disabled citizens displayed talents that were not easily acquired. The deaf were thought to have been selected by the gods due to their peculiar behavior. This behavior was a direct result of their auditory disabilities and stressed desire to communicate. They were treated respectfully and educated, usually through the use of hieroglyphs and signing gestures.

== Ancient Greece ==
Sign language was first documented in ancient Greece. In one of Plato's dialogues he describes how the deaf used gestures to mimic moving objects through similar motions. Plato quotes his teacher Socrates in the Cratylus as follows: "if we had neither voice nor tongue, and yet wished to manifest things to one another, should we not, like those which are at present mute, endeavor to signify our meaning by the hands, head, and other parts of the body?....I think, therefore that if we wished to signify that which is upwards and light, we should raise our hands towards the heaven, imitating the nature of the thing itself; but that if we wished to indicate things downwards and heavy, we should point with our hands to the earth..." Unlike ancient Egypt, the Greeks felt it was better to kill anyone with a disability. The deaf were especially considered a burden in Athens, where it was believed that anyone who would be a "burden to society" should be put to death. The city of Athens felt that ending the lives of those impaired was in the best interests of the state. This was because war and conflict occurred continuously and certain abilities were considered important to have. Everyone was meant to serve the state. Philosopher Aristotle along with Greek physician Galen concluded that the deaf could never speak, believing that the ability to speak and hear were linked; being derived from the same area in the brain. Galen, feeling that if one capability was impaired the other would be impaired also, was considered to be correct. Additionally Aristotle's views, which were similarly related to Galen's, were also viewed as accurate and this idea went unchallenged until the sixteenth century A.D.

== 16th century ==
=== Pedro Ponce de Leon, a Spanish Benedictine monk ===
During the mid-sixteenth century brothers Pedro and Francisco Fernandez Velasco y Tovar, were sent to live in a monastery by the name of Ona where they were under the guidance of Pedro Ponce de Leon. The two brothers belonged to one of the wealthiest and most powerful families in Spain. At that time, the noble families sent their disabled children to monasteries because it was believed that the children's disabilities were directly related to the sins of the parents. For this reason, the families hid their children because they were ashamed. During this time ten percent of children born to noble families were deaf. This was because noble families in Spain during this time married their blood relatives to keep the wealth within the family. The Velasco boys were placed under the care of Ponce because of their attachment to him when they arrived at the monastery. Ponce himself had become attached to the boys and decided to educate them. Many critics credit Ponce with being the first person to educate the deaf, but it is stated by Van Cleve in Deaf History Unveiled that he was in fact not the first person to educate the deaf but the first person to teach the deaf to speak. He then argues that a monk from La Estrella, whose name is not given, is the first person that should be credited with educating the deaf. Contrastingly in the History of Deaf People written by Per Eriksson, he credits St. John of Beverley with being the first person to educate the deaf. St. John was the bishop of York, England around 700 A.D. He is considered the first to disagree with Aristotle's opinion of a deaf person's ability to learn.

=== Sign language ===
Communication came from both the homes of the deaf in addition to the monasteries they were sent to.

== 19th century ==
=== Advocates ===
Thomas Francis Fox was born on November 16, 1859, and became deaf at age ten after contracting spinal meningitis. Soon after, his parents enrolled him in the New York School for the Deaf (also known as the Fanwood School), where he first became integrated into the Deaf community. In 1879, he enrolled at Gallaudet College. During his time there, Fox became involved with the newly formed National Association of the Deaf (NAD) and emerged as a staunch promoter of Deaf cultural values.

His advocacy was driven by the rise of the oralist movement—which gained international momentum following the 1880 Milan Conference—that sought to ban sign language and systematically remove Deaf educators from schools. In response to this threat, Fox fiercely advocated for the preservation of residential schools for the deaf, the continued employment of Deaf instructors, and the right to use sign language as the primary medium of instruction. After graduating from Gallaudet in 1883, he returned to the New York School for the Deaf, where he taught for over fifty years and eventually became the principal of the academic department. Following his retirement, he remained actively involved in the school's community until his death in 1944.

== 20th century ==
=== Equality ===
During the early 1900s membership to various deaf organizations was denied to African Americans. Associations and even some churches prevented African Americans from becoming members including the National Association of the Deaf and the National Fraternal Society of the Deaf. There were fewer people to relate to who shared the same ethnic background and many of the Caucasian deaf leaders made no attempt to improve the quality of the black deaf community. During this time racism was more prevalent and there were perhaps shared views of the blacks by both hearing and deaf white males. Because of this National Black Deaf Advocates was formed. In addition discrimination was also made against deaf women. Colleges produced more male graduates than female, and deaf females were completely excluded or had only limited access to various club affiliations. They were also given easier workloads by teachers. Associations at national and state levels had no or only small amounts of actual participation by women. Women were often allowed to give their opinions or share their ideas for support of the preservation of sign language and the deaf community, but they did not hold any authoritative positions that allowed them to make decisions on behalf of the deaf community. Even though they had a tough time being heard, deaf women still continued to seek involvement in language and cultural preservation. They eventually begin to establish their own clubs and organizations in which they expressed their ideas and views on issues concerning the deaf community. Associations such as the Camp Fire Girls at state schools and the OWLs at Gallaudet College were formed in support of deaf women of Caucasian ethnicity.

=== Cochlear implant ===
The cochlear implant is a device surgically implanted in the skull that provides stimulation to the nerve to promote hearing. It is a prosthetic with wires attached to the cochlea and is located behind the ear. The cochlear implant has a microphone, connecting cables, a speech processor, and a battery. The processor converts sounds into electrical impulses by taking information from sound patterns and producing an electrical pulse in the ear of the host. Although the implant does provide an artificial means by which its hosts can hear, this is not the same as a hearing aid because it does not elevate sound. With this implant, sounds are not the same as sounds that a hearing person experiences. Teaching recipients to understand the sounds they hear takes years and there is no guarantee they will be able to make sense of the information. Therefore, the cochlear implant is not able to give all deaf people hearing and speech.

=== Economic/Job opportunities ===
During the mid to late 20th century, a study showed that two-thirds of American adults with disabilities did not have a job. It was also found that around eighty percent of those unemployed had the desire to work. Employers often said they did not provide adequate accommodations for those with disabilities. They were also unsure if they could trust those persons with disabilities to perform requested tasks correctly. In response to these problems the Americans with Disabilities Act (ADA) of 1990 was ratified. This attempted to reduce discrimination against those with disabilities in both private and governmental business sectors. Furthermore, the ADA placed the responsibility of providing needed accommodations on the employer.

== Efforts around the world ==
=== China ===
Since more individuals with disabilities live in China than any other country in the world, special education has become an important area of focus. China once had great ideological resources in this field; yet, the schools for disabled people created in the late nineteenth century were established by Western missionaries. Since the late nineteen hundreds the legislation has expressed its concern and made efforts to encourage the progress of special education in China.

=== Canada ===
In Canada, efforts have been made to adopt a bilingual-bicultural model of education, using American Sign Language (ASL) as its standard language for instruction. It is assumed that this approach will lead to an enhancement in learning, expression and achievement in deaf students.

=== Australia ===
National and worldwide legislation has focused an increasing amount of attention on the values of inclusion. This attitude is geared toward those with disabilities. Inclusive education has been accepted and implemented to prevent and reduce biased attitudes concerning students with disabilities. UNESCO's education policy was approved at the Salamanca Conference in 1944 and establishes the privilege to education for all disabled students. It has been considered a basic human right despite the fact that disabled students will need adequate accommodations. The international focus has been placed on the Rights of Children (1989) as well. World leaders have made a commitment to find ways to increase the number of children who attend school. In result the national policies have been impacted by these developments. In Australia, the viewpoint of education has been modeled after those international trends. Australia has made efforts to see that all of their students are educated. Moreover, the Disability Discrimination Act of 1992 has played an important role in support of education for disabled people as well. Australia has presented itself as a country in great support of human rights. This act was implemented with the intent to secure the rights of disabled people. Additionally the Disability Discrimination Act has three key purposes: to discourage discrimination, to promote equality for disabled people before the law, and to insure the acceptance of disabled people by communities.

=== Africa ===
South Africa's constitution and the Integrated National Disability Strategy along with other legislation claims to be one of the most proactive methods in support of the disable. Yet, most of the sentimentality does not exceed policy level and the enforcement of these guidelines has trailed far behind.

== ASL training ==
American Sign Language (ASL) is used in both the United States and in English speaking parts of Canada. Although it is produced with gestures and seen with the eyes. Because ASL does not require the use of voice or the ability to hear, it is used by deaf people, as well as people who have trouble communicating through spoken language, whether due to physical limitations or due to intellectual disabilities. Sign language is not globally consistent; instead it is similar to other languages in that the signs used in various sign languages are regional and steeped in culture. Though English is spoken in both Great Britain and the United States, American Sign Language and British Sign Language are in fact rather dissimilar. ASL actually has greater similarity to French Sign Language because American Sign Language has its origin in French Sign Language, but today, they are distinctive and different from one another. A common misunderstanding is that ASL can be directly translated to the English language. This is false, because English and American Sign Language do not share the same grammar or syntax. Contrary to what has been presumed sign languages do have a specific format. They are not just different signs representing a word combined to create speech. As oral languages have a particular format in which the words are presented, sign languages has its own format as well. Just as errors are made in the English language with a slight mispronunciation or mistaken letter arrangement, ASL can have the same errors with just a slight difference in gestures that are similar. This does not mean that grammar rules of oral language is in any way directly related to that of sign language, but the same concept can be taken into account. Although we can compare the processes of developing ASL with that of the spoken English language the difference between the two must be recognized. The qualitative factor of ASL is much different from English in form. The largely sequential phonetic structure of oral languages, with relatively few suprasegmental features, contrasts with a greater degree of simultaneity in sign languages. Sign languages have four simultaneously realized parameters: hand configuration, location, movement and orientation. Hand configuration, location and movement are what determine what is being signed. A simple combination of words can differ in just location, movement, or the way in which you hold your hand as you are signing.

== Preservation of sign language ==
The deaf community made continuous efforts to help preserve sign language communication as oralists made many attempts to suppress the language and promote oral communication. The attempt to supplant sign language, by the hearing, lead to the production of dictionaries and films intended to expose and promote sign language in the oral community as well as the deaf. Many deaf people spent most of their free time socializing with their deaf peers and joined clubs within the deaf community after graduating from school. Their efforts continued in the promotion of the preservation of sign language.

== See also ==
- Comité International des Sports des Sourds
- History of deaf education in the United States
- History of deaf education in Africa

== Bibliography ==
Collins, M. T. (1995). History of Deaf-Blind Education. Journal of Visual Impairment & Blindness. 89(3).

Kemaloğlu, Y. K.; Kemaloğlu, P. Y (2012 ). "The history of sign language and deaf education in Turkey" . The Turkish Journal of Ear Nose and Throat: 65–76

Macherey, Oliver; P. Carlyon, Robert (2014). "Cochlear Implants". Science Direct.

Marschark, Marc; Spencer, Patricia Elizabeth (2010). "The Oxford Handbook of Deaf Studies, Language, and Education". Oxford University Press.

Osgood, Robert L. (2008). "The History of Special Education: A Struggle for Equality in American Public Schools". Praeger
