= Oralism =

Education method for deaf students

Oralism, also known as the German method, is the education of deaf students through oral language by using lip reading, speech, and mimicking the mouth shapes and breathing patterns of speech. Oralism and its contrast, manualism, manifest differently in deaf education and are a source of controversy for involved communities. Listening and Spoken Language, a technique for teaching deaf children that emphasizes the child's perception of auditory signals from hearing aids or cochlear implants, is how oralism continues on in the current day.

== History ==
=== Middle ages ===
In Bede's Ecclesiastical History, Saint John of Beverly is noted to have attempted to educate a deaf youth using oral methods.

During the Middle Ages, there were attempts to force deaf people to speak by putting hot coals in their mouths.

=== 16th and 17th centuries ===
Widespread efforts focused on teaching deaf people to speak can be traced back to the 16th century in Europe.

Oralism as the systematic education of deaf people began in Spain in the mid-1500s and can be considered the byproduct of socioeconomic motives. Namely, deaf people were prohibited from inheriting their families' wealth unless they could speak. Oralism provided members of the privileged classes whose children were deaf a way to channel their children's education and an opportunity to keep them away from the deaf community. Speaking has been associated with the higher classes and higher intellect, and the perception of signing has been the opposite. At this time, the church also barred deaf people from Holy Communion because they could not confess aloud.

==== Early oralist educators ====
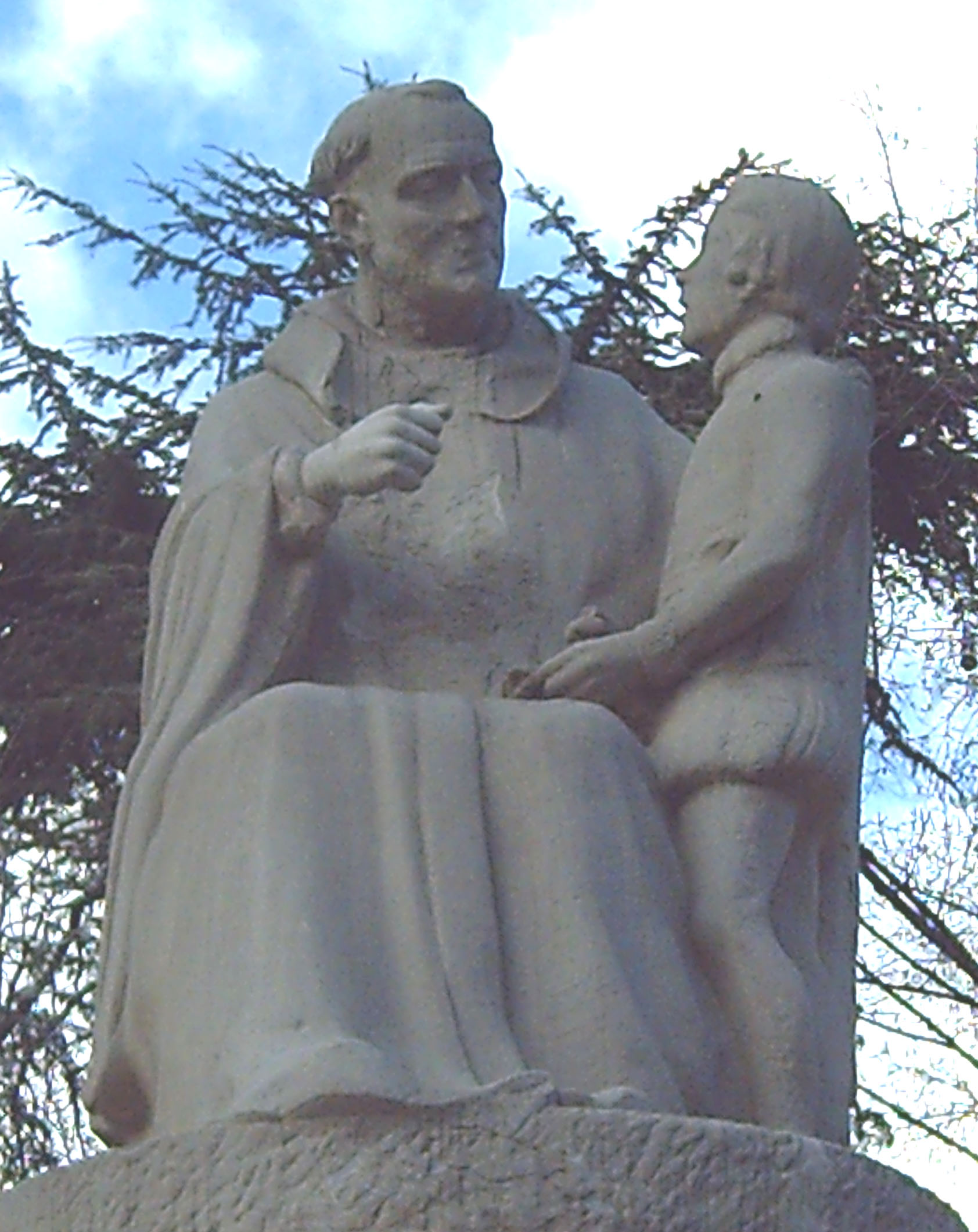
The Spanish friar Pedro Ponce created a pure oral method to teach to deaf people how to read, talk and count.

Pedro Ponce de León (1520–1584) was a monk who became known for teaching a young deaf man to speak in San Salvador Monastery in Oña. Wealthy families sent their deaf heirs to study with Ponce to become oral, largely in order to preserve their familial wealth.

In 1620, Juan Pablo Bonet (c. 1579–1633) published Reducción de las letras y arte para enseñar a hablar a los mudos, which circulated widely as a foundation method for teaching. He hoped to "cure" deaf people. Bonet was an oralist that defended the use of words to communicate, but also incorporated the use of sign language, borrowing the manual alphabet from Ponce. However, he did not let deaf people use this to communicate with each other.

Other early teachers of the oralist technique included mathematician John Wallis and Conrad Amman, the latter using a manual alphabet in teaching deaf people to speak.

=== 18th century ===
Other oralist teachers from this century who pursued lip-reading techniques included Jacob Rodrigues Pereira and Samuel Heinicke, the latter keeping his methods closely guarded.

Of these early oralist teachers, Gerald Shea writes in his book, The Language of Light: A History of Silent Voices (2017):

"In asking the Deaf to lipread a spoken tongue, these teachers were asking them to understand the meaning of the movement of lips to form the words of a language not their own, that they had never learned to speak, had never heard, and that to a substantial extent is expressed invisibly, in-side the mouth."

Practices such as putting burning liquids up people's noses - in the hope that it would stimulate the eardrum - were practised well into the 18th century. Physician Jean Marc Gaspard Itard working at the Institution Nationale des Sourds-Muets à Paris conducted, according to his successor Prosper Menière, "painful, barbaric, absurd and useless" experiments on patients in an attempt to cure their deafness such as: pouring herbal mixtures into their ears, moxibustion, applying blistering agents on the ears, branding the skin behind the ear, threading strings through their necks with a seton needle, as well as drilling holes in patients' skulls behind the ear. Ferdinand Berthier and Claudius Forestier, who in their adulthood became noted leaders in the deaf community in France, were both subjected to this during their time at the school.

Since the beginning of formal deaf education in the 18th century in France by Abbé de l'Epée, who supported the use of sign language, manualism and oralism have been on opposing sides of a heated debate that continues into the 21st century.

=== 19th century ===
According to the Darwinian theory, sign languages (and thus their users) were considered to be at a lower stage of evolution than spoken languages.

In the 1850s, Jacob Rodrigues Pereira's grandsons, Émile and Isaac Pereire along with Isaac's son Eugène, wanted to redeem their grandfather's image and revive his methods of lip-reading and spoken language. In 1875 they established the J. R. Pereire Society with the aim of "promot[ing] the teaching of speech and lipreading, by speech, to the deaf." In 1879, they established a school, and employed French oralist Marius Magnat to run it.

Oralism came into popular use in the United States around the late 1860s.

==== Schools ====
In 1867, the Clarke School for the Deaf in Northampton, Massachusetts, was the first school to start teaching in this manner. Before the Clarke School for the Deaf (now the Clarke School for Hearing and Speech) made its mark in deaf American education in the 1860s, there was a popular support of manualism. Manual language soon became a less popular choice for deaf education due to the new Darwinist perspective. Clarke School for the Deaf in 1867 became a "mainstream service" for deaf students through creating a "learn to listen" mentality. This was done through the proper training of educators in auditory/oral education.

Since its start, Clarke School has expanded and provided support for oral communication within deaf education and policy.

It has been remarked that, in the United States, the better-funded northern schools switched to oralism while their poorer southern counterparts kept signing because it was difficult to hire new oralist teachers.

==== Policy ====
In relation to the early 16th-century oralism in Spain, 19th-century oralists viewed oral language as a superior form of communication. Gardiner Green Hubbard, Horace Mann, Samuel Gridley Howe and Alexander Graham Bell were popular supporters of oralism and its impact on deaf education and services. Until the end of the 19th century, many educators of deaf America were deaf themselves. However, oralists like Alexander Graham Bell began to wield increasing influence. Bell and others believed in deaf assimilation with the mainstream hearing world. Bell also believed that sign language was an instrument of imprisonment and that its use prevented the "gesturer" from being a "true American". Bell had no opinion regarding whether or whom deaf people should marry. By contrast, negative eugenicists sought to stop the spread of "bad genes" through invasive measures such as mandatory placement in institutions or sterilization. Bell believed oralism was "an attractive option to sterilization". To Bell, implementation of oralism meant the possibility of a mainstream and "normal" life for deaf individuals.

In 1878, the International Congress on the Education of the Deaf (ICED) met in Paris to discuss the use of sign language and other issues within deaf education. During the congregation, no Deaf members were allowed to testify. The ICED met again in 1880, in Milan with 164 educators attending with one of them being deaf. This meeting created the solely oralist classroom preventing any form of sign language from being used. Moreover, deaf teachers were widely disallowed from teaching deaf children. After the Milan conference, the Deaf community referred to this time in history as "the dark ages for deaf education in America".

==== Classroom ====
Hearing educators who could not sign replaced deaf teachers and, by the mid-20th century, eighty percent of American secondary schools for the deaf used the oral method exclusively. Some strategies, such as Total Communication or SimCom, saw classes conducted in a mixture of spoken and signed English with the teacher signing along, in English word order as they delivered their lecture. For example, is, was and the, which are not used in sign, were spelled out by the teachers using the manual alphabet. Students were taught using the articulation method, which taught them how to speak and lip read. Oralists believed that signs were no more than gross holistic gestures, which stood for English words in a one-to-one correspondence. Sentences in sign were thought to have no grammar. The facial expressions, such as exaggerated movements of the mouth, tongue, eyes, and lips, suggesting grimacing or excessive emotional display, triggered horror in hearing people. Students were asked to stop moving their faces when they signed, which would later be described as equivalent to asking hearing people to speak in declarative sentences uttered in monotone.

=== 20th century ===
==== Movement towards manualism ====
Even though students were not allowed to use manual signs within the classroom, many deaf students preferred manual signs and used them frequently in their dorm rooms at residential schools for the deaf. Some deaf children were considered "oral failures" because they could not pick up oral language. Others thought that the techniques of oralism actually limited them on what they were taught because they always had to concentrate on the way the words were formed, not what they meant.

Leaders of the manualist movement, including Edward M. Gallaudet, argued against the teaching of oralism because it restricted the ability of deaf students to communicate in what was considered their native language. Moreover, "attempts to eliminate sign language were tantamount to stripping them of their identity, their community, and their culture."

==== Policy change ====
The retraction of laws forbidding the use of sign language in the classroom occurred in 2010 with the International Congress on the Education of the Deaf (ICED) in Vancouver. Deaf grassroots activists and the planning committee of ICED created a solution to provide proper education to the deaf globally.

== Modern usage ==
Oralism is no longer used to teach language or communication in the United States. Parental use of the oral approach typically stems from a parental desire for their child to use a spoken language to communicate with the majority hearing population. They also feel the use of a spoken language will further their child's literacy and written language skills in the classroom. Some researchers believe that the success of the oral approach in a classroom setting had not been fully evaluated. Recent research has demonstrated that an oral education using Listening and Spoken Language can provide most deaf children with spoken language skills that are equivalent to those of their hearing peers if using a cochlear implant, which is a hotly debated device in the Deaf community.

=== Oral schools ===
Clarke Schools for Hearing and Speech: focus on helping deaf and hard of hearing children develop spoken English and listening skills. The school's goal is to prepare students for the mainstream setting.

Cleary School: focus on ASL and spoken English in its elementary, middle, and high school classrooms. Their Pre-K focuses on spoken English.

Memphis Oral School for the Deaf: teaching children to develop their spoken and written English skills by teaching children in spoken English.

Moog Center for Deaf Education: provides listening and spoken language services to children who are deaf or hard of hearing, ages birth to early elementary years, and their families.

Tucker Maxon School: a spoken-language early intervention and Pre-K through 5th grade educational institution based in Portland, Oregon. Enrollment includes children who are deaf or hard of hearing, as well as children with typical hearing in an inclusive, co-enrolled, mutually beneficial classroom environment. The school's mission is to teach "deaf and hearing children to listen, talk, learn, and achieve excellence together".

=== Efficacy ===
Recent studies from the USA have demonstrated that learning a sign language before learning to speak does not hinder one's ability to acquire a spoken language.

==== With cochlear implants ====
There have been few quantitative evaluations regarding the long-term outcomes of oral programs for deaf individuals, but those that do exist tend to study this in relation to children with cochlear implants. One study compared the English development of deaf children with a cochlear implant versus what the English development might have been without the implant. English development was greater and more successful for the implanted deaf child than that of the non-implanted child based on the implementation of a predictive model. The predictive model employs age, residual hearing, and communication mode used by the child to predict the language development. Although deaf implanted children are already at a disadvantage for English development when compared to their hearing counterparts, the implant, on average, reduced what could have been an even larger deficit had the child not been implanted (based on the predictive model). The authors recommend implanting the child as early as possible.

The studies did not consider how a non-implanted child exposed to a signed language and a bilingual/bicultural education could develop English skills in relation to a hearing child's English development. Multiple studies find that by ensuring a deaf child has access to American Sign Language, their overall academic performance is better than those who are not.

There also was no accurate predictor of oralism's success in the classroom.

==== Without cochlear implants ====
Communication in oral-deaf students without cochlear implants is typically less frequent and less complex than hearing peers of the same age. These expressed communications are less clear than that of their hearing peers. Linguistically, these communications are typical of the language skills seen much earlier in their hearing counterparts. Despite efforts to encourage the sole reliance on speech and spoken language in oral schools, some oral-deaf individuals developed sign systems among themselves in non-supervised settings. Additionally, oral-deaf children often used manual gestures/signs simultaneously or in addition to vocalizations during expressive communications at home.

==== Reading ====
Some studies have called into question the role of developing spoken language skills in relation to developing reading skills. One study in particular demonstrated that while individuals who became deaf before developing spoken language did show a decreased ability to differentiate between the phonological properties of a language, they showed equal capability of recognizing and understanding the orthographic properties of what they were reading. In fact, compared to their hearing counterparts, the deaf individuals showed an increased rate of written word processing skills as they increased in age. Altogether, this research provided evidence contrary to the belief that spoken skills are critical to the development of reading skills, and further proposes that educational approaches should include a stronger focus on building awareness of written language forms separate from the related aural aspects.

=== Social ===
There is little existing research on the social, professional, and mental health of deaf individuals using oral methods in comparison to those using other methods of education and communication. However, some studies suggest that social-emotional outcomes for deaf children who use cochlear implants and spoken language are statistically significantly higher than those of their signing deaf counterparts in a world made for ableism.

It is reported by some that deaf children in an oral setting may feel depressed, anxious or experience aloneness and embarrassment.

== See also ==
- Audism
- Language deprivation in deaf and hard of hearing children
- Deaf culture
- Manualism
- History of deaf education in the United States
- Signalong
- Baby sign language
