= Johann Konrad Ammann =

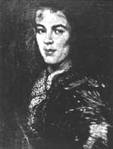
J.C. Amman

Johann Konrad Ammann (Note: Spelling as in most German-language sources. Many English-language and original Latin sources use the spelling Amman.) (1669 – 1724) was a Swiss physician and instructor of non-verbal deaf persons.

Johann Konrad Ammann was born at Schaffhausen, Switzerland. After graduating at Basel in 1687 he began to practise at Amsterdam, where he gained a great reputation. He was one of the earliest writers on the instruction of the non-verbal deaf, and first called attention to his method in his Surdus loquens (Amsterdam, 1692), which was often reprinted, and was reproduced by John Wallis in the Philosophical Transactions (1698).

His process consisted principally of drawing the attention of his pupils to the motions of his lips and larynx while he spoke, and then inducing them to imitate these movements, until he brought them to repeat distinctly letters, syllables and words. He died at Warmond, near Leiden.
