= Gallaudet (surname) =

Gallaudet is a surname of Huguenot origin, and may refer to

- Edson Fessenden Gallaudet (1871–1945), American pioneer in the field of aviation, son of Edward Miner Gallaudet
- Edward Gallaudet (engraver) (1808–1847), American engraver
- Edward Miner Gallaudet (1837–1917), American educator of the deaf, son of Thomas Hopkins and Sophia Gallaudet
- John Gallaudet (1903–1983), American film and television actor
- Peter Wallace Gallaudet (1756–1843), personal secretary to US President George Washington in Philadelphia, father of Thomas Hopkins Gallaudet
- Sophia Fowler Gallaudet (1798–1877), American activist for the deaf, wife of Thomas Hopkins Gallaudet
- Thomas Hopkins Gallaudet (1788–1852), American educator of the deaf
- Thomas Gallaudet (priest) (1822–1902), American Episcopal priest, son of Thomas Hopkins and Sophia Gallaudet
- Timothy Gallaudet, American oceanographer
