= Child of deaf adult =

Person raised by one or more deaf people

A child of deaf adult, often known by the acronym CODA, is a person who was raised by one or more deaf parents or legal guardians. Ninety percent of children born to deaf adults are not deaf, resulting in a significant and widespread community of CODAs around the world, although whether the child is hearing, deaf, or hard of hearing has no effect on the definition. The acronym KODA (kid of deaf adult) is sometimes used to refer to CODAs under the age of 18.

The term was coined by Millie Brother who also founded the organization CODA, which serves as a resource and a center of community for children of deaf adults as an oral and a sign language, and bicultural, identifying with both deaf and hearing cultures. CODAs often navigate the border between the deaf and hearing worlds, serving as liaisons between their deaf parents and the hearing world in which they reside.

== CODA identity ==
Many CODAs do not identify with the "hearing world" or the "deaf world". Rather, they simply identify as CODAs: a bridge between the two "worlds" as they often find themselves in the middle of two. While CODAs might find some similarities between themselves and their hearing peers, they might also find that their upbringing within the Deaf community and culture sets them apart. CODAs with cochlear implantation are often even more mixed between these worlds. They communicate with their families through signing but with the hearing world through talking.

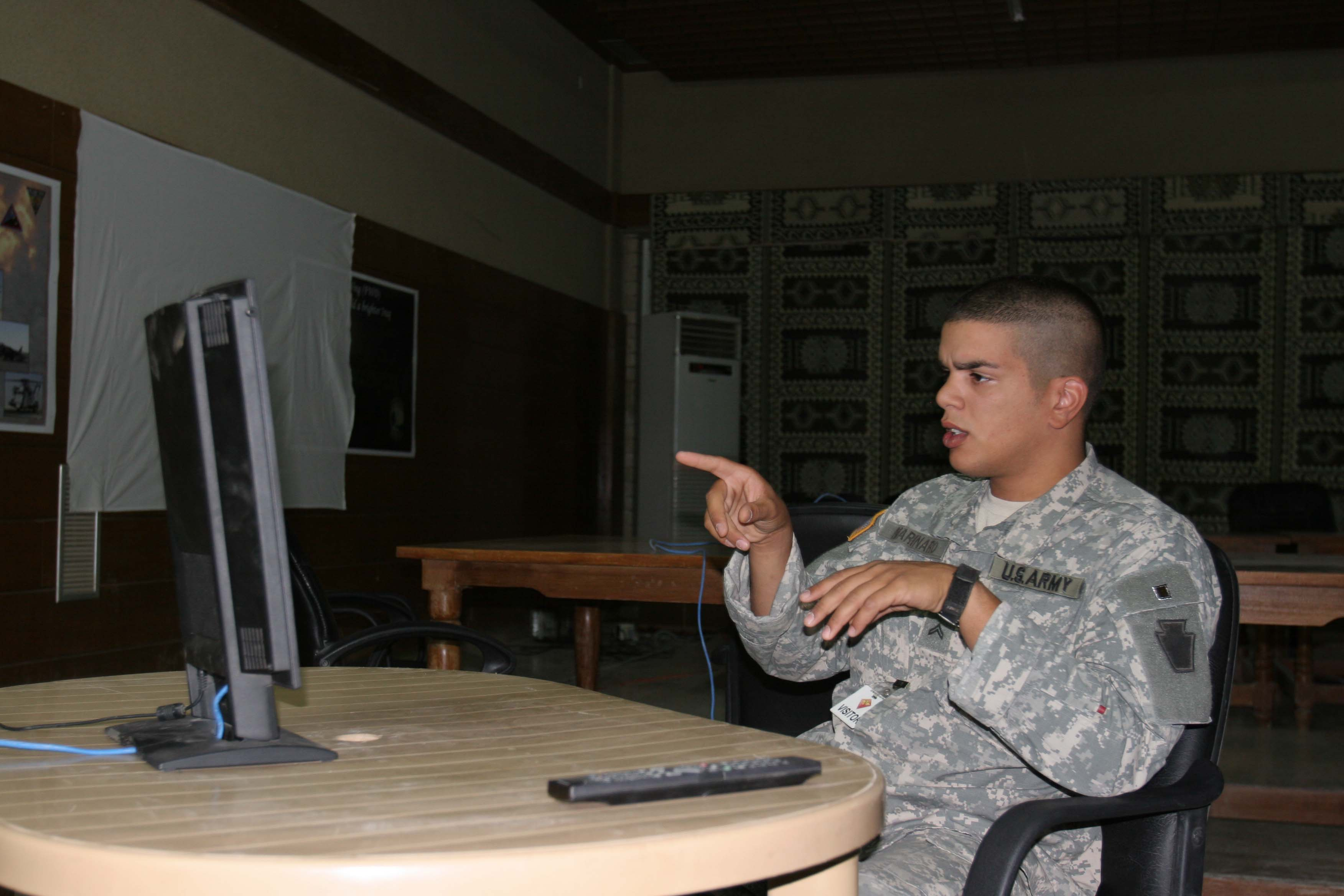
CODA communicating with parents using video technology

== Potential challenges facing hearing CODAs ==
If no spoken language is used in the home, CODAs may experience a delay in spoken language acquisition. Spoken language is typically acquired without instruction if exposed to the hearing community at a reasonably young age, whether through other family members or at school.

The challenges facing the hearing children of deaf adults parallel those of many second-generation immigrant children. Just as many first-generation immigrant parents frequently struggle to communicate in the majority (spoken) language, and come to rely on the greater fluency of their bilingual children, deaf parents may come to rely on hearing children who are effectively fluent bilinguals. This dynamic can lead CODAs to act as interpreters for their parents, which can be especially problematic when a child CODA is asked to interpret messages that are cognitively or emotionally inappropriate for their age. For example, a school-aged child may be called on to explain a diagnosis of a serious medical condition to their deaf parent.

In addition, CODAs are often exposed to prejudice against their family. The isolation can deprive the child of normal social skills. Many people may assume that the entire family is deaf because they are all able to sign and communicate in this manner. Bystanders may make negative comments about the deaf community in that family's presence, not realizing the child can hear. Deaf parents may not adequately understand that while a deaf person can look away or close their eyes, a hearing person cannot choose to ignore hurtful words so easily. The CODAs might often keep the hurtful comments to themselves adding additional weight to the already difficult circumstances.

Discordant hearing status can also pose practical problems. Deaf and hearing people differ in visual attention patterns, with deaf people being more easily distracted by movement in peripheral vision. Deaf parents often instinctively use such movement to attract their child's attention, which can lead to difficulties engaging in joint attention with hearing toddlers. Parental sensitivity to child cues modulates this effect, with highly sensitive parents being more able to adjust to a child's differences from them.

== Support organizations ==
Millie Brother established the organization CODA (Children of Deaf Adults) in 1983 as a non-profit organization for the hearing children of deaf parents. Its first annual conference took place in 1986 in Fremont, California. The conferences have grown and have taken on an international status, with attendees hailing from around the world. CODA aims to raise awareness about the unique experiences and issues of growing up between these two cultures. It provides a forum for CODAs to discuss the shared problems and experiences with other CODAs.

Regardless of the spoken and sign languages used, CODA believes that such feelings and experiences that derive from the binary relationship of the two divergent cultures are universally felt by CODAs. CODA provides educational opportunities, promotes self-help, organizes advocacy efforts, and serves as a resource for CODAs raised in both signing and non-signing environments.

There are support groups for deaf parents who may be concerned about raising their hearing children, as well as support groups for adult CODAs. One organization, KODAheart provides educational and recreational resources for deaf parents and hearing children through an educational website and pop-up camps. Several camps have been established for KODAs:

- Camp Mark Seven, which was established as the first KODA camp in 1998. They have two two-week programs for campers from 9 to 16 years old.
- Camp Grizzly, which hosts a one-week program for preteen and teen CODAs
- KODAWest, which is a week-long camp in Southern California held annually in the summer for campers from ages 8 to 15, Counselors-in-training (CIT) from ages 16 to 17, and Counselors from ages 18 and older.
- KODA MidWest, which is held in Wisconsin and has several sessions ranging from 7 – 16 years old, Counselors-in-training (CIT) at age 17, and Counselors ages 18 and older. This camp offers three sessions a summer with substantial variety in campers' ages and is often fully enrolled each session.

There is also CODA UK, Ireland, Hong Kong, Germany, Italy and France.

== Notable CODAs ==
- Francesco Antonioli, former goalkeeper for Roma and Milan
- Charlie Babb, American pro-football player for the Miami Dolphins (1972–1979)
- Alexander Graham Bell, whose mother, Eliza Grace Symonds Bell, was hard of hearing, and whose wife, Mabel Hubbard, became deaf at age 5
- Elizabeth English Benson, hearing teacher, administrator, interpreter for two U.S. presidents, raised by two deaf parents.
- Grace Byers, Caymanian-American actress
- Lon Chaney, American actor raised by deaf parents
- Rosie Cooper, British politician, campaigner for recognition of British Sign Language
- Kambri Crews, American comedic storyteller and author of The New York Times best seller Burn Down the Ground who incorporates sign language in performances and whose maternal grandparents are also deaf
- Dennis Daugaard, American politician and Governor of South Dakota (2011–19)
- Louise Fletcher, American Academy Award-winning actress for One Flew Over the Cuckoo's Nest
- Edward Miner Gallaudet, founder of Gallaudet University, son of Sophia Fowler Gallaudet and Thomas Hopkins Gallaudet, founder of the American School for the Deaf, the first school for the deaf in the U.S.
- Craig Gass, comedian
- Robert Gibson, professional wrestler
- Richard Griffiths, English actor
- Moshe Kasher, stand-up comedian, writer and actor
- Richard E. Ladner, American computer scientist noted for his extensive contributions to both theoretical computer science and accessible computing
- Stefan LeFors, former Canadian football quarterback for the Winnipeg Blue Bombers and former broadcaster for his alma mater, the University of Louisville
- Lim Eun-Kyeong, South Korean actress (Resurrection of the Little Match Girl, Conduct Zero/No Manners)
- Julia Montes, Filipino actress
- Edgar Padilla, Puerto Rican basketball player
- Costel Pantilimon, goalkeeper for Nottingham Forest and the Romania national football team
- Paul Raci, American actor known for Sound of Metal
- Homer Thornberry, United States Representative from the 10th congressional district of Texas from 1948 to 1963
- Jim Verraros, American Idol finalist, season 1
- Keith Wann, American Sign Language Comedy Performer and host of ASL radio show
- Ozzy Wiesblatt (born 2002), Canadian NHL ice hockey player
- Matt Crooks (born 1994), English professional footballer

=== Fictional CODAs ===
- Gil Grissom from the TV series CSI: Crime Scene Investigation
- Abby Sciuto from the TV series NCIS
- Rosie from the Ghostly Tales for Ghastly Kids short story "The Locked Door"
- Paula Bélier from the 2014 French film La Famille Bélier
- Ruby Rossi from the 2021 comedy-drama film CODA, an English-language adaptation of La Famille Bélier
- Ha Eun-gyeol from the TV series Twinkling Watermelon
- Stephan Jänicke from the 2017 German Netflix series Babylon Berlin
- Yok from the 2021 Thai TV series Not Me

== Related deaf culture acronyms for identifying family members ==
- OHCODA – Only Hearing Child of Deaf Adults (deaf parents and deaf siblings)
- OCODA – Only Child of Deaf Adult(s) (no siblings)
- COCA-CODA – Child of CODA Adult and Child of Deaf Adult
- KODA – Kid of Deaf Adult(s)
- GODA – Grandchild of Deaf Adult(s)
- SODA – Sibling of a Deaf Adult(s)
- SpODA – Spouse of Deaf Adult

== Publications ==
- Paul Preston (1995-09-01). Mother father deaf: living between sound and silence. Harvard University Press. ISBN 978-0-674-58748-9.
- Leah Hager Cohen (1995-04-25). Train go sorry: inside a deaf world. Vintage. ISBN 978-0-679-76165-5.
- Kambri Crews (2012). Burn Down the Ground: A Memoir. Villard. ISBN 978-0-345-51602-2.
- Guido (2012). Adytum.
