= Elizabeth Peet =

American educator and lecturer specializing in American Sign Language

- Born: March 26, 1874; New York City
- Died: June 29, 1961
- Education: George Washington University
- Occupations: Educator, academic administrator
- Mother: Mary Toles Peet

Elizabeth Peet (March 26, 1874 – June 29, 1961) was an American educator of the deaf who taught at Gallaudet University for more than fifty years. Born to a deaf mother and a hearing father, Peet learned American Sign Language at an early age, and was a scholar in the history and etymology of ASL signs. She was described by U.S. Representative George P. Miller in 1950 as "a tiny lady who is considered the world's leading authority on sign language."

== Early life ==
Elizabeth Peet was born in New York City on March 26, 1874. Peet grew up as a CODA (child of deaf adult), as her mother, poet Mary Toles Peet, was deaf and used American Sign Language (ASL) to communicate. Her father and grandfather were both educators of the deaf: her grandfather Harvey P. Peet served as the president of the New York Institution for the Deaf for decades, while her father Isaac Lewis Peet grew up on the campus and would later become president of the same institution. Elizabeth's parents met while Isaac was a teacher at the school and Mary was a student.

Elizabeth learned to sign at a young age and had a close relationship with her mother. She attended private schools and was tutored in Latin by her father.

At age sixteen Peet passed the entrance exam for Harvard University but decided to travel with her father as his personal secretary.

== Career ==
After the death of her father in December 1898, Peet joined the Rhode Island School for the Deaf as a teacher in training. In the spring of 1900 Edward Miner Gallaudet traveled to Rhode Island to ask Peet to join the faculty at Gallaudet, although she did not have an academic degree at the time. She was the first woman to have a faculty position at the school.

Peet taught multiple subjects, including English, Latin, and French, as well as sign language to hearing students and faculty. She also frequently served as an interpreter.

While teaching at Gallaudet, she earned a Bachelor of Arts degree from George Washington University in 1918. She would be awarded two honorary degrees: a Masters of Arts from Gallaudet in 1923 and an honorary Doctor of Pedagogy from George Washington University in 1937. Peet also spent time studying at the Sorbonne and was awarded the Certificat apres Examen, Cours speciaux d'Ete in 1932.

In 1928 Peet was named Dean of Women at Gallaudet; she held that position until her retirement in 1951, succeeded by Elizabeth English Benson. Peet was elected as the Dean of the Midcentury by the National Association of Deans of Women. She also served as the assistant editor of the American Annals of the Deaf from 1942 to 1945.

== Death and legacy ==
The Elizabeth Peet Residence Hall was dedicated in 1956, five years after her retirement. Peet died on June 29, 1961. She was inducted into the Gallaudet University Hall of Fame.

The Elizabeth Peet Award is given annually to an outstanding graduate student in school psychology at Gallaudet.
