= Light Up the Sky (play) =

Play by Moss Hart

- Original language: English
- Written by: Moss Hart
- Subject: Satire on the theatre
- Genre: Comedy
- Setting: Living room of a suite at the Ritz-Carlton Boston

Premiere
- Date: November 18, 1948
- Place: Royale Theatre, New York City
- Directed by: Moss Hart

Light Up the Sky is a three-act play written by the American playwright Moss Hart. It is a character-driven satire with the fast pacing of a farce, a simple plot, medium-sized cast, and only one setting. The plot concerns the interrelations of theater people before and after a first-night tryout, when they experience nervous anticipation, perceived failure, and unexpected success in sequence. The play became known before its premiere as well-founded rumors suggested some characters were modelled on actual theater personalities. There are allusions to figures from the larger world of New York shows, including David Belasco and George Jean Nathan, as well as topical references to the late 1940s stage scene. The most egregious of these was Hart's mention of real drama critics (Note: These were Elliot Norton of The Boston Post, Cyrus Durgin of The Boston Globe, and Elinor Hughes of the Boston Herald.) then active in Boston, attributing to them spurious quotes for the fictional tryout.

The play was selected as one of the best plays of 1948-1949, with an excerpted version published in "The Burns Mantle Best Plays of 1948-1949."

== Characters ==
Leads

- Sidney Black — a flamboyant showman with no legitimate theater experience, who has sunk $300k into the play. Based on Billy Rose.
- Irene Livingston — a famous actress, self-adoring with a haughty manner and explosive temper, the star of the new play. Based on Gertrude Lawrence.
- Peter Sloan — a naive young playwright with a blue-collar background, who has idealistic notions. Hart's memory of himself as a novice.
- Carleton FitzGerald — the temperamental director, whose tag-line is "I could cry". Based on Guthrie McClintic.
- Owen Turner — an older playwright, practical and calm, who has worked with the star and director before. Based on the Moss Hart of 1948.
- Stella Livingston — the star's tough mother, a pessimist who plays endless games of gin rummy with Frances Black.

Supporting

- Frances Black — a former female athlete, a bit crass, now married to producer Sidney Black. Based on Eleanor Holm.
- Miss Nan Lowell — a likeable author, ghost-writing the star's memoir; the linchpin of the first act.
- Tyler Rayburn — an out-of-place Ivy League-educated businessman, husband of the star, who treats him as a servant.

Featured

- Sven — a masseur, employed by the star, seen and heard briefly in the first act.
- Max, a Shriner — an unruly conventioneer, seen and heard briefly in the second act.
- A Plain-Clothes Man — a detective, who returns Peter Sloan to the suite at Sidney Black's behest during the third act.
- William H. Gallegher — a Shriner from Elkhart, Indiana, a theatre lover, whose entry triggers the third-act climax.
- Orson — a caged parrot, the star's pet, squawks "S.R.O." and "Bless you darling". (Note: A live bird during the initial tryouts, it was quickly replaced by a stuffed cousin due to repeated insubordination. An off-stage actor supplied the parrot's lines via a microphone.)

== Synopsis ==
The story concerns the tryout of a fictional play, The Time Is Now, at the Colonial Theatre in Boston. The play itself is neither seen nor heard. The setting is the living room of the star's luxury suite, in the Ritz-Carlton hotel across the street from the theater.

The first act takes place at 5:30 pm, before the tryout starts, with hopes high and nerves on edge. Miss Lowell sits at a typewriter in the living room, with just Orson for company. One or two at a time the other characters come in and are introduced: Carleton FitzGerald, the overly emotional director; Frances Black, the shockingly outspoken wife of the producer; Owen Turner, the experienced older playwright just stopping by for a drink; Stella Livingston, the star's pessimistic mother who prophisises doom; Peter Sloan, the starry-eyed young trucker turned author, whose novice effort is now being given a tryout; Sidney Black, the excited, over-eager producer sponsoring his first play; and finally, Irene Livingston, the self-absorbed, aristocratic-behaving star.

The second act occurs at 12:30 am, after the performance has had a seemingly disastrous finish, many in the audience having laughed and walked out before the ending. Sloan is blamed for the failure, and in turn vents about the harsh treatment lavished on him by those who earlier praised his work. Turner counsels him to accept compromises in his play in order to salvage it. Meanwhile, joyfully raucous Shriners, attending a convention, roam the hotel hallways and even burst into the suite on occasion. The act ends with Sloan storming out, headed for the airport.

The final act is set at 3:30 am; the rest of the characters are still conducting a gloomy post-mortem on the performance. They are disturbed by the entry of an uninvited guest, William H. Gallegher, a Shriner, who announces the play is a success. He has copies of the early morning papers, from which it is learned the audience were largely his drunken compatriots, with the critics hailing the play as very good but needing some work. Sidney Black phones a plain-clothes detective, who brings Sloan unwillingly back from the airport. Grasping the changed state of affairs, Sloan takes charge of the others, who now look to him for advice on how to proceed.

== Original production ==
=== Background ===
Moss Hart began writing the play in April 1947, spending nearly a year on it. It was produced by Joseph M. Hymen and Bernard Hart, the author's younger brother. Others with a financial interest in it were George S. Kaufman and Max Gordon. Casting began in June 1948, which is also when Frederick Fox was contracted to design the play's setting. There were four weeks of rehearsals in September 1948, with Moss Hart doing the stage direction.

=== Tryouts and revisions ===
Starting October 8, 1948, it had a three-performance tryout in New Haven, Connecticut. The production went to Boston's Plymouth Theatre (not the Colonial as in the play) on October 11, 1948. The critic Cyrus Durgin proved a forthright reviewer, (Note: He had been given permission to travel with the troupe from New Haven to Boston for a feature article, and was mentioned in the play itself.) identifying a major flaw with the second and third acts, where the hilarity of the fast-paced opening is followed by long self-pitying diatribes from the young playwright, the abrupt change in mood confusing the audience. Elliot Norton of the Boston Post said the original version of the play was much more serious than what it would become.

Hart took the criticism seriously; he rewrote the second and third acts while in Boston, replacing five minor characters with three new ones. The new second and third acts now played as comedy, complete with a deus ex machina in the form of a Shriner from Indiana.

The reworked play then went to Philadelphia for two weeks, opening November 1, 1948. Only one cast change occurred from the Boston tryout, when J.J. the live parrot was replaced by a stuffed namesake and a hidden microphone.

=== Cast ===
The lead and supporting characters were portrayed by the same actors from first tryout through the Broadway closing. The featured roles underwent changes with the tryout rewrites as shown below.

Cast during tryouts in New Haven, Boston, and Philadelphia, and the original Broadway run
Actor	Role	Type	Notes
Virginia Field	Irene Livingston	Lead	Reportedly she never missed a performance because Kitty Carlisle (Mrs. Moss Hart) knew the part thoroughly.
Sam Levene	Sidney Black	Lead	In years to come Levene would be the actor most associated with productions of this play.
Barry Nelson	Peter Sloan	Lead	
Philip Ober	Owen Turner	Lead	
Phyllis Povah	Stella Livingston	Lead	
Glenn Anders	Carleton FitzGerald	Lead	
Audrey Christie	Frances Black	Supporting	
Jane Middleton	Miss Nan Lowell	Supporting	
Bartlett Robinson	Tyler Rayburn	Supporting	
Si Oakland	Intern/Sven	Featured	Originally cast as one of two Interns, parts eliminated early on in Boston, he took over the role of Sven
John D. Seymour	Dr. Schloss/a Shriner	Featured	Originally cast as Dr. Schloss, a part dropped during tryouts, he was re-cast for this new role during rewrites in Boston.
Donald McClelland	William H. Gallegher	Featured	He was cast for this part created during the third-act rewrite in Boston.
Ronald Alexander	A Plain-Clothes Man	Featured	He was cast for this part created during the third-act rewrite in Boston.
Effie Afton	Flo	Featured	This role was eliminated during rewrites in Boston
Jack Kerr	Benny Meadows	Featured	This role was eliminated during rewrites in Boston
Emily Ross	Maid	Featured	This role was eliminated during rewrites in Boston
Terence Little	Waiter	Featured	This role was eliminated during rewrites in Boston
Robert Bernard	Intern #2	Featured	This role was eliminated during rewrites in Boston

=== Premiere ===
The Broadway premiere was at the Royale Theatre on November 18, 1948. An advertising blimp hung over 45th Street with a lighted sign on it displaying a good luck message for the production just below. Billy Rose and his wife, Eleanor Holm, two of the personalities satirized in the play, were there as invited guests of Moss Hart. Gertrude Lawrence, another of the disguised characters, sent a cable from London to Moss Hart, with a salutation of "Dear Hideous". According to producer Bernard Hart, the "long line at the box office the next day and for the next week was a sure sign we had a hit".

The title of the play was a theatrical term often associated with successful shows. For outsiders however it suggested a quotation from some other literary work, and the program guide obliged with one on the title page:

"Mad, sire? Ah, yes, -- mad indeed, but observe how they do light up the sky."—Old Skroob in The Idle Jeste.

This was a bit of foolery from Hart. Both quote and play were imaginary, aimed at Brooks Atkinson, drama critic for The New York Times, who in his review the next day gave the complete quote (but not the speaker's name) and dryly said the play cited "is unknown to this department".

=== Response ===
Brooks Atkinson declared it "a loud, broad, tempestuous comedy that is acted at top speed by a wonderful cast". Calling the actors "runners in a comic steeplechase", Atkinson said "Under Mr. Hart's excitable direction the performance races around the stage like a volcanic circus, everybody shouting, everybody making exits and entrances and slamming doors". Atkinson said the cast was superb, and praised each lead and supporting actor individually.

John Chapman at the New York Daily News was nearly as enthusiastic about the play, calling it "a noisy and rollicking comedy about the art of drama". He said "it is no model of play construction", but judged it entertaining, well-acted, and adroitly directed. He also wrote a follow-up article on how Light Up the Sky paralleled the fictional play within it, in that the Boston critics had recommended changes to make it successful.

A covertly critical response to the play concerned the parrot. Originally named J.J. in suggestion of a certain theater-owning magnate, a newspaper column reported, shortly after the premiere and without explanation, that it had been renamed to Orson.

One dissident critic was George Jean Nathan, who wrote a plaintive column, more about his bruised ego than the play, which he described as "crude and pretty vulgar". Nathan, perhaps reacting to Miss Lowell in the play accusing the squawking parrot "Who do you think you are, George Jean Nathan?", suggested it was human nature to laugh at another's embarrassing predicament. Nevertheless, he felt Hart had crossed the line with this play, particularly since Hart himself was notoriously thin-skinned.

=== Closing ===
The original Broadway run closed on May 21, 1949, for a total of 214 performances. During the last weeks of the production Moss Hart had declined his royalties as author and director so that the "angels" (stage lingo for sponsoring producers) could get their original investment back. Business had fallen off with the warming weather, and as was usual for that time there were rumors of chicanery by the ticket brokers. Bernard Hart told reporters that the investors had made a profit of only $10,000, which led them to sell the national touring rights to another producer.

== National tour ==
Joseph M. Hymen and Bernard Hart sold their interest in the touring company to Eddie Rich, who announced in June 1949 that the tour would kick off that fall. This was perhaps a mistake, for by the time the tour opened in Wilmington, Delaware on October 7, 1949 the East Coast had been saturated with summer stock and community theater productions of the play.

=== Cast ===
The only two principals from the Broadway run who were willing or able to commit to the national tour were Sam Levene and Glenn Anders. Lynn Bari was signed for the Irene Livingston role, while a surprising but inspired choice, the scandalous burlesque artist Margie Hart, was cast for the Frances Black role. That role was actually a supporting one, but Margie Hart was given star billing along with Levene, Bari, and Anders.

Cast for the start of the national tour in October 1949
Actor	Role	Type	Notes
Lynn Bari	Irene Livingston	Lead	
Sam Levene	Sidney Black	Lead	
Thomas Coley	Peter Sloan	Lead	A successful stage actor, Coley was cast after his own work, The Happiest Years flopped in April 1949.
Brent Sargeant	Owen Turner	Lead	
Mary Mace	Stella Livingston	Lead	
Glenn Anders	Carleton FitzGerald	Lead	
Margie Hart	Frances Black	Supporting	
Diana Herbert	Miss Nan Lowell	Supporting	
William Roerick	Tyler Rayburn	Supporting	Roerick was co-author with Coley of The Happiest Years; it had played at the Lyceum, then owned by Kaufman and Hart.
Edward Bushman	A Shriner	Featured	
John Clubley	William H. Gallegher	Featured	
David Durston	A Plain-Clothes Man	Featured	

== Adaptations ==
Even before the national touring company set out, the play was licensed to smaller theaters in the New York area. Sam Levene redid Moss Hart's original staging, and played his original role of Sidney Black in the Off Broadway Subway Circuit.

=== Television ===
The Ford Theatre was due to broadcast a live performance of Edward, My Son, but MGM, which was about to release a movie version, objected. Instead, a live version of Light Up the Sky was performed, using whichever original actors still happened to be in New York at the time. The script was cut drastically for the one-hour running time and adapted for live television. Sam Levene, Glenn Anders, Barry Nelson, Audrey Christie, and Phyllis Povah all reprised their parts, but Virginia Field had already left town. Her role was taken by Carol Goodner, while Carl Frank played Owen Turner. CBS broadcast the performance on June 13, 1949.
