= Gallaudet Memorial =

Coordinates: 38.905503°N 76.9951113°W

Thomas Gallaudet Memorial
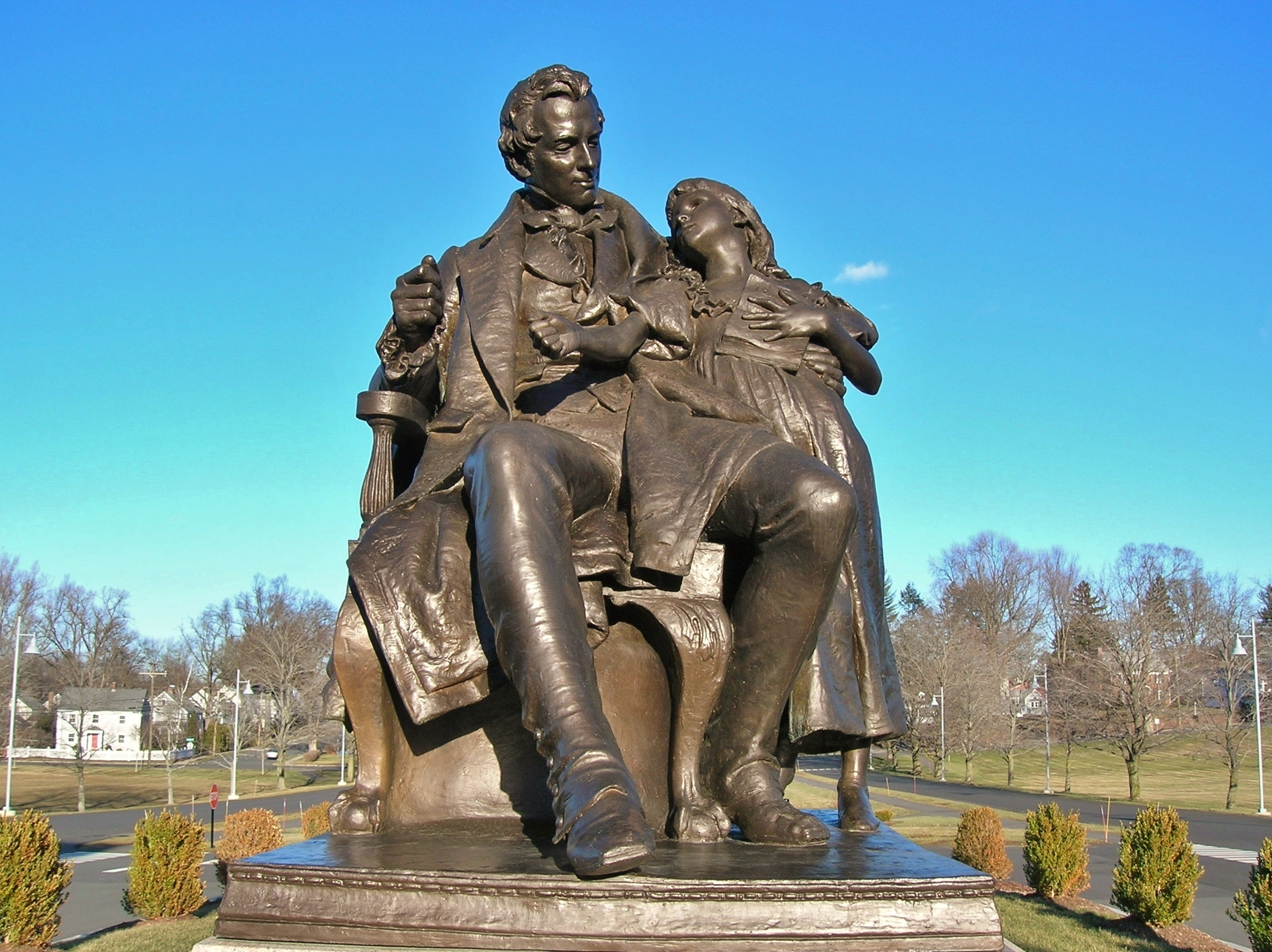
- Sculpture in 2016 (replica)
- Interactive map of Thomas Gallaudet Memorial
- Location: Gallaudet University, Washington, D.C., United States
- Designer: Daniel Chester French (sculptor)
- Material: Bronze (sculpture)

The Thomas Gallaudet Memorial is a sculpture by Daniel Chester French located on the campus of Gallaudet University in Washington, D.C., United States. The 1889 statue depicts Thomas Hopkins Gallaudet sitting in a chair and Alice Cogswell standing at his side.

== Creation and unveiling ==
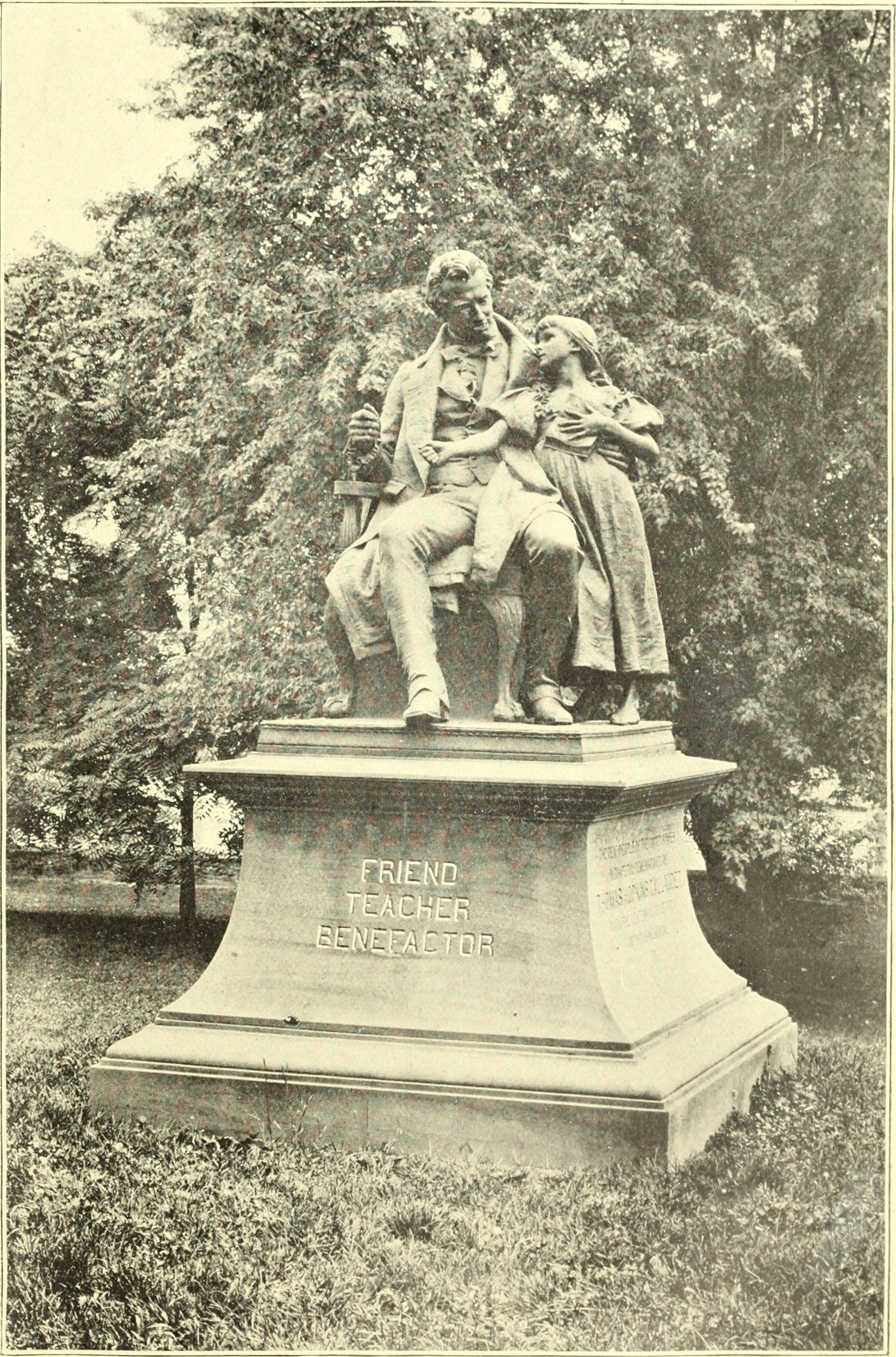
The memorial in 1898

French was asked by Edward Miner Gallaudet, the first president of Gallaudet University, to create a statue of his father, Thomas Hopkins Gallaudet, in 1882. Due to a lack of funding and French's busy schedule, French was not formally commissioned to create the Thomas Gallaudet Memorial until 1887. French's commission was not without controversy. Students at Gallaudet University objected to a hearing sculptor creating the sculpture and lobbied for Albert Victor Ballin, who was deaf, to receive the commission. Additionally, Ballin came with the recommendation of American sculptor Augustus Saint-Gaudens, who was also French's artistic rival. Edward Miner Gallaudet refused to void French's contract, and French started working on the statue.

French completed a plaster model of the statue by November of that year. In 1888, French worked to enlarge his model. During the enlargement process, French reworked the chair that Gallaudet sits on as well as the position of his right arm. For his efforts, French was paid $3000 (equivalent to $85,367 in 2019).

The Thomas Gallaudet Memorial was unveiled in June 1889.

A replica of the statue was installed at the American School for the Deaf in West Hartford, Connecticut in 1924.

== See also ==
- Public sculptures by Daniel Chester French
