= Frances Laughlin Wadsworth =

American sculptor

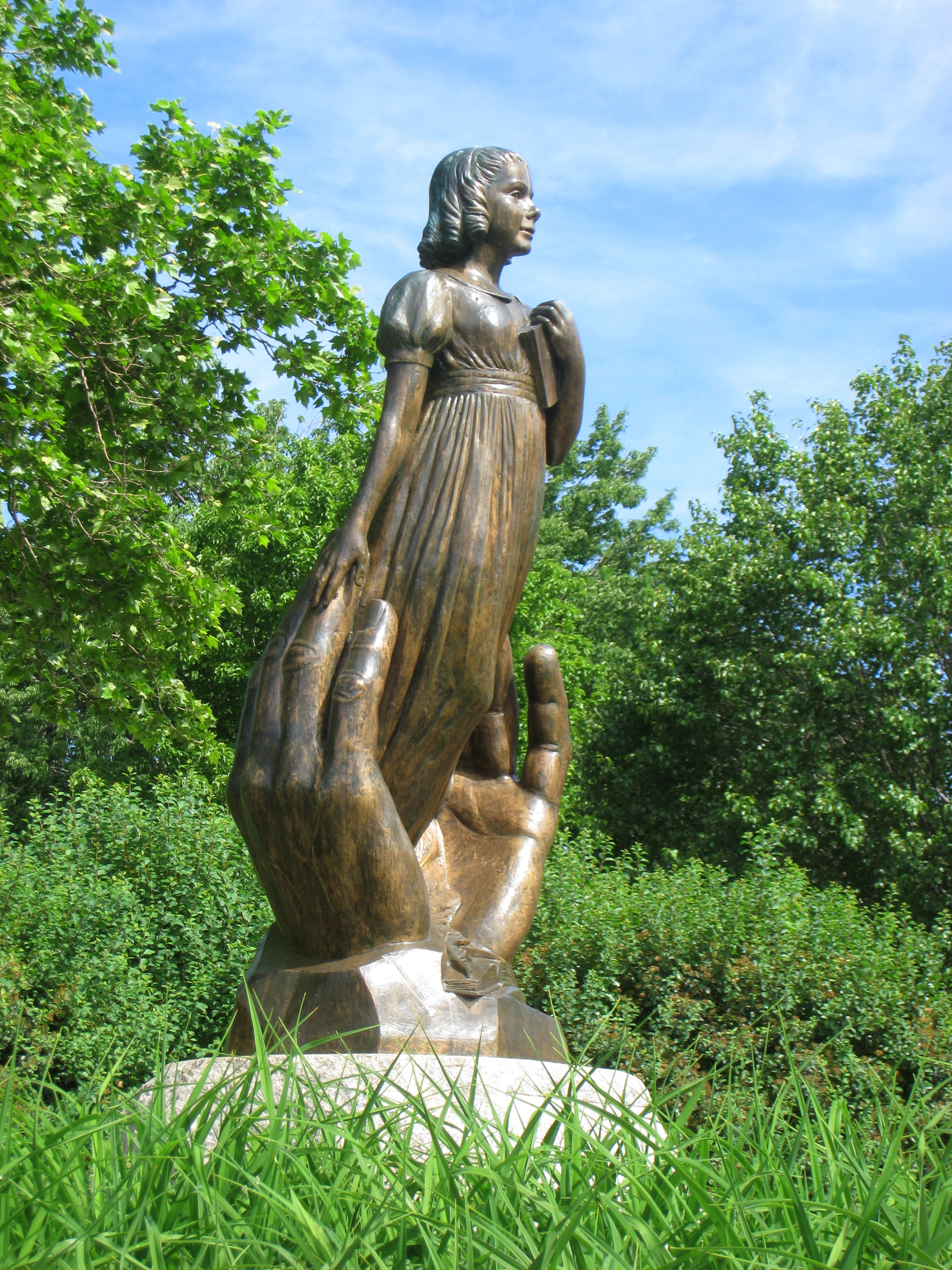
Alice Cogswell statue, Hartford, Connecticut

Frances Laughlin Wadsworth (1909-1978) was an American sculptor active in Hartford, Connecticut.

Wadsworth was born in Buffalo, New York, on June 11, 1909. Her parents were Frank and Martha Laughlin. Wadsworth graduated from St. Catherine's School (Richmond, Virginia) in 1927, from which she received the Distinguished Alumna Award in 1970. She also trained in Europe.

Wadsworth moved to Hartford when she married Robert Wadsworth, an executive at Travelers Insurance. Hartford was then considered the insurance capital of the United States. Robert was also a direct descendant of Daniel Wadsworth, who had created the Wadsworth Atheneum, the first public art museum in the United States. However, at the time of Frances and Robert's marriage, the Wadsworth family was no longer involved in the administration of the Museum.

Frances Wadsworth was commissioned to produce a number of pieces of public art in Connecticut. She also served as Fine Art Instructor at the Institute of Living in Hartford, as part of an initiative to introduce art therapy for patients.

== Selected works ==
- Thomas Hooker statue, 1948
- Brother and Sister, Institute of Living, Hartford, 1949
- Thomas Hooker statue, Hartford, 1950
- Alice Cogswell statue (American School for the Deaf Founders Memorial), Hartford, 1952
- The Safe Arrival, Hartford, 1964
- The Young President, 1964
- Day Dreams, date unknown
- Love, date unknown
- "The peer status of sixth and seventh grade children", New York, Bureau of Publications, Teachers College, Columbia University, 1954.
- Robert Kennedy, 1966
