= Elizabeth Benson =

Elizabeth Benson may refer to:

- Elizabeth P. Benson (1924–2018), American art historian, curator and scholar
- Elizabeth Benson (sculptor) (1888–1976), South African sculptor
- Elizabeth English Benson (1904–1972), American educator for deaf students
- Liz Benson (born 1966), Nigerian actress and television personality
