= Gallaudet (disambiguation) =

Gallaudet is may refer to

== People ==
- Gallaudet (surname)
- Gallaudet Eleven, a group of deaf men recruited to study weightlessness

== Aircraft ==
- Gallaudet Aircraft Company, founded by Edson Fessenden Gallaudet, and later acquired by Consolidated Aircraft
  - Category:Gallaudet aircraft - articles about specific aircraft made by this company

== Places ==
- Gallaudet University
  - Gallaudet University Press, university publisher that focuses on issues relating to deafness and sign language
  - Gallaudet Bison football
- Gallaudet College Historic District, a district in Washington, D.C.
- NoMa–Gallaudet U station, is an island platformed station on the Washington Metropolitan Area Transit Authority's (WMATA) Metro system
