= Samuel Lightfoot Flournoy =

Samuel Lightfoot Flournoy may refer to:

- Samuel Lightfoot Flournoy (lawyer) (1886–1961), American lawyer and politician
- Samuel Lightfoot Flournoy (politician) (1846–1904), American lawyer and politician

== See also ==
- Flournoy (surname)
- Lightfoot (surname)
