= Angeline Fuller Fischer =

Deaf American writer

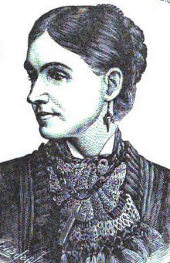
- Born: August 11, 1841; Savanna
- Died: April 2, 1925

Angeline Fuller Fischer (August 11, 1841 – April 2, 1925) was an American writer. She is considered one of the earliest deaf feminists due to her advocacy for the equal education of deaf women. Her poems and articles were published in publications across the United States; in 1908 the newspaper The Silent Worker called Fischer "one of America's great deaf poets".

== Early life and education ==
Angeline Ashby Fuller was born in Savanna, Illinois on August 11, 1841. She attended local schools until the spring of 1854, when she lost her hearing after becoming ill with whooping cough and typhoid fever. Her family was unaware of any special education available for the deaf, but after seeing an article in the Northwestern Christian Advocate in 1859 she applied to the school for the deaf in Jacksonville, Illinois.

She was eighteen years old when she began attending the Illinois School for the Deaf. She began writing her first poems and her teachers recognized and encouraged her to continue developing her talent for poetry. Severe problems with her sight caused by her earlier illness plagued her throughout her life. Spells of blindness and other illness cut her education short and she spent only two years at the school.

== Advocacy for deaf women ==
After leaving school, Fischer developed an interest in helping the deaf community. She raised funds for St. Ann's Church for the Deaf in New York City. She instructed several deafblind children and in 1880 took a position as a residential dean at the Texas School for the Deaf, but poor health required her to return to her family's home in Savanna. After writing articles in the Deaf-Mutes' Journal, a publication offering advice and support to deaf women, Fischer became the leading feminist in the deaf community of the United States.

Fischer attended the first convention of the National Association of the Deaf, arguing for the participation of women in NAD. She met her future husband at the convention: George E. Fischer was the deaf editor of a county newspaper. They married in May 1887 and lived in Omaha, Nebraska.

In 1886, Fischer and Georgia Elliott began a letter-writing campaign to argue for admitting women to Gallaudet. Fischer threatened to start a separate deaf women's college as far from Gallaudet as possible if the administrators did not change their policy. In response, Gallaudet agreed to admit six women in 1887.

== Writing ==
Her book of verse, The Venture, published in 1883, was one of the first literary accounts from a deaf perspective. Fischer wrote that deafness or blindness could not be understood solely as a hardship or a lack of ability. Ideas she presented in her poetry were so radical that they would take over a century to be revisited by scholars; these include the concept that deaf and disabled people have played central roles in foundational texts (such as the Bible), as well as arguing that disability was not located within individuals but as a result of the societal conditions that did not meet everyone's communication needs. Fischer's friends Oliver Wendell Holmes and John Greenleaf Whittier gave favorable reviews to the book.

Fischer was considered one of the leading deaf writers of her era. One of her sonnets was featured in Harper's Monthly Magazine and her poems were featured in several anthologies. She published articles and verse in newspapers such as The Wisconsin Times, the Omaha Monitor, and the Thorold Post (Ontario). Fischer also managed a distributing agency with her husband. When her husband died in July 1904, she moved to live with her sister in Rockford, Illinois, and continued to write poetry and articles for the deaf community. She advocated for establishing a home for elderly deaf people. Her last article in The Silent Worker was a 1915 call for a memorial to Sophia Fowler Gallaudet in honor of Gallaudet's many contributions to the education for the deaf.

Fischer died on April 2, 1925. Her efforts in promoting deaf women's rights have earned Fischer the recognition by disability scholars as one of the first deaf feminists.
