= Peter Wallace Gallaudet =

Peter Wallace Gallaudet (April 21, 1756 – May 17, 1843) was a personal secretary to US President George Washington in Philadelphia. He married Jane "Jeannette" Hopkins of Hartford, Connecticut, in 1787.

Gallaudet lost both parents by the age of 18 and went to live with his uncle, Elisha Gallaudet, who was the engraver of the first US coin, the 1776 "Continental Dollar".

Gallaudet enlisted as a soldier in the American Revolutionary War and took part in the Battle of Trenton, December 26, 1776.

After Gallaudet's wife died in 1818, he went to work as a commission merchant. In 1824, he moved to Washington, D.C., to work in the Register's Office at the United States Treasury. In 1834, he organized a board of directors and received papers of incorporation to start a manual labor school and orphan asylum in Washington, D.C. Money was raised for this purpose, but the money was held in reserve and the school was never built. Gallaudet and his friend Michael Nourse, who also worked at the Treasury Department, raised $2,000 by selling a booklet titled "A facsimile copy of the Accounts of General Washington's expenses during the Revolutionary War, also a copy of a line of march proposed by him for the British army in the expedition of 1758 against Fort Du Quesne." In 1838, a pamphlet was authorized for publication by the board of directors of the manual labor school organization which was written by Peter Wallace Gallaudet titled: "A System of Education, on the Principle of Connecting Science with Useful Labor." The main essay of the pamphlet is dated September 30, 1829 and was originally published by G. Gallaudet in c. 1829. In the essay, G. Gallaudet supports the educational philosophy of Philipp Emanuel von Fellenberg, a philosophy which, he explains, was based partly on the educational philosophy of Johann Heinrich Pestalozzi. As mentioned on page 241 of the biography of Gallaudet's son, Thomas Hopkins Gallaudet, written by Gallaudet's grandson, Edward Miner Gallaudet, Thomas Hopkins Gallaudet had also become acquainted with the educational philosophy of von Fellenberg and, in 1833, visited a manual labor school in Greenfield, Massachusetts, which followed von Fellenberg's philosophy.

By 1860, seventeen years after Gallaudet's death, his grandson Edward Miner Gallaudet had become superintendent of a school for the deaf. Edward made arrangements with the directors of the corporation of the manual labor school that was never built, and together they approached Congress to obtain permission to dissolve the corporation and cede the funds to the school that Edward had helped establish, the Columbia School for the Deaf, which was the school which, in 1864, added a collegiate department and became Gallaudet College (1894) and then Gallaudet University (1986).

Gallaudet was the father of Thomas Hopkins Gallaudet, the co-founder of the first permanent school for the Deaf in North America, the American School for the Deaf in West Hartford, Connecticut.

Gallaudet was the second of six children. His siblings' names were: Edgar (1753–1790); Thomas (1758–1759); David (1760–1761); Thomas (b. 1762); and Catherine (1766–1786).

== Sources ==
Gallaudet, Peter Wallace. 1838. A System of Education, on the Principle of Connecting Science with Useful Labor. Re-published by Order of the Trustees of Washington's Manual Labor School and Male Orphan Asylum. Washington: Printed by Peter Force.

== See also ==
"Sesquicentennial of T.H. Gallaudet Observed With Short Chapel Rites", Buff and Blue, Friday, Dec. 17, 1937, pp. 1, 3.
