= Edmund Booth =

American journalist

Edmund Booth (1810 – 1905) was a journalist, writer, and leader in the American deaf community.

Booth was born August 24, 1810, in Springfield, Massachusetts. He became partly deaf and blind in one eye at the age of four from an attack of meningitis. At the age of eight he became totally deaf. He never lost his ability to speak. In 1828 he entered the American School for the Deaf, and upon his graduation four years later was appointed an instructor in that school. He held this position for seven years, resigning in 1839 on account of failing health.

Hoping to recover health in outdoor life and to find fortune in what was then regarded as the far west, Booth emigrated to Jones County, Iowa, after severing his connection with the American School. At that time the nearest house to the place he chose as his future home was a mile and a half distant, but gradually a flourishing town grew up around him which received the name of Anamosa. This was his residence for the rest of his life, except for a few years passed in California during the gold rush which began in 1849.

In 1840, Booth built the first frame house erected in Jones County, and in the same year he was married to Mary Ann Walworth, who had been his pupil at Hartford. She died in 1898. Of this marriage were born four children, the youngest of whom was the editor of the Association Review.

In 1856, Booth became editor, and a few years later owner, of the Anamosa Eureka. He retained the position until his death, though for several years past most of the work has been done by his oldest son, who became his partner in the ownership of the paper in 1868. Booth also wrote several articles for the Annals other periodicals. He was elected county recorder three times, and during one session of the Iowa House of Representatives engrossing clerk. It was through his influence the first steps were taken by the State of Iowa for the education of deaf children. He presided in 1880 as temporary chairman at the organization of the National Association of the Deaf. In the same year he received the honorary degree of Master of Arts from Gallaudet College.

Booth died on March 29, 1905.
