= Alice Cogswell =

First student of an official deaf school in the US (1805–1830)

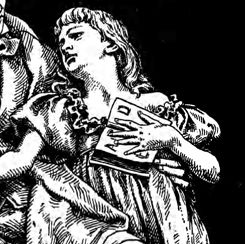
- Engraving of Alice Cogswell (1889)
- Born: August 31, 1805; Hartford, Connecticut
- Died: December 30, 1830 (aged 25); Hartford, Connecticut, United States

Alice Cogswell (August 31, 1805 – December 30, 1830) was the inspiration to Thomas Hopkins Gallaudet for the creation of the American School for the Deaf in Hartford, Connecticut.

== Cogswell and Gallaudet ==
At the age of two, Cogswell became ill with "spotted fever" (cerebral-spinal meningitis). This illness took her hearing and later she lost her speech as well. At the time, deafness was viewed as equivalent to a mental illness, and it was widely believed that the deaf could not be taught. Gallaudet moved into the house next door to hers when she was nine years old. Upon learning she was deaf and noticing she wasn't interacting with other children, he decided to teach her to communicate through pictures and writing letters in the dirt.

Gallaudet and Alice's father, Dr. Mason Cogswell, decided that a formal school would be best for her, but no such school existed in the United States. Gallaudet went to Europe for 15 months, bringing Laurent Clerc back with him upon his return. During the time of his absence, Alice attended a hearing school and somewhat furthered her education, though the situation was not ideal. She was very lively, and enjoyed reading, sewing, and dancing. She was reportedly very good at mimicking others, and was fascinated by the concept of music.

Alice Cogswell and six other Deaf students (George Loring, Wilson Whiton, Abigail Dillingham, Otis Waters, John Brewster, and Nancy Orr) entered the school that would become the American School for the Deaf in April 1817.

She died at the age of twenty-five on December 30, 1830, thirteen days after the death of her father.

== Legacy ==
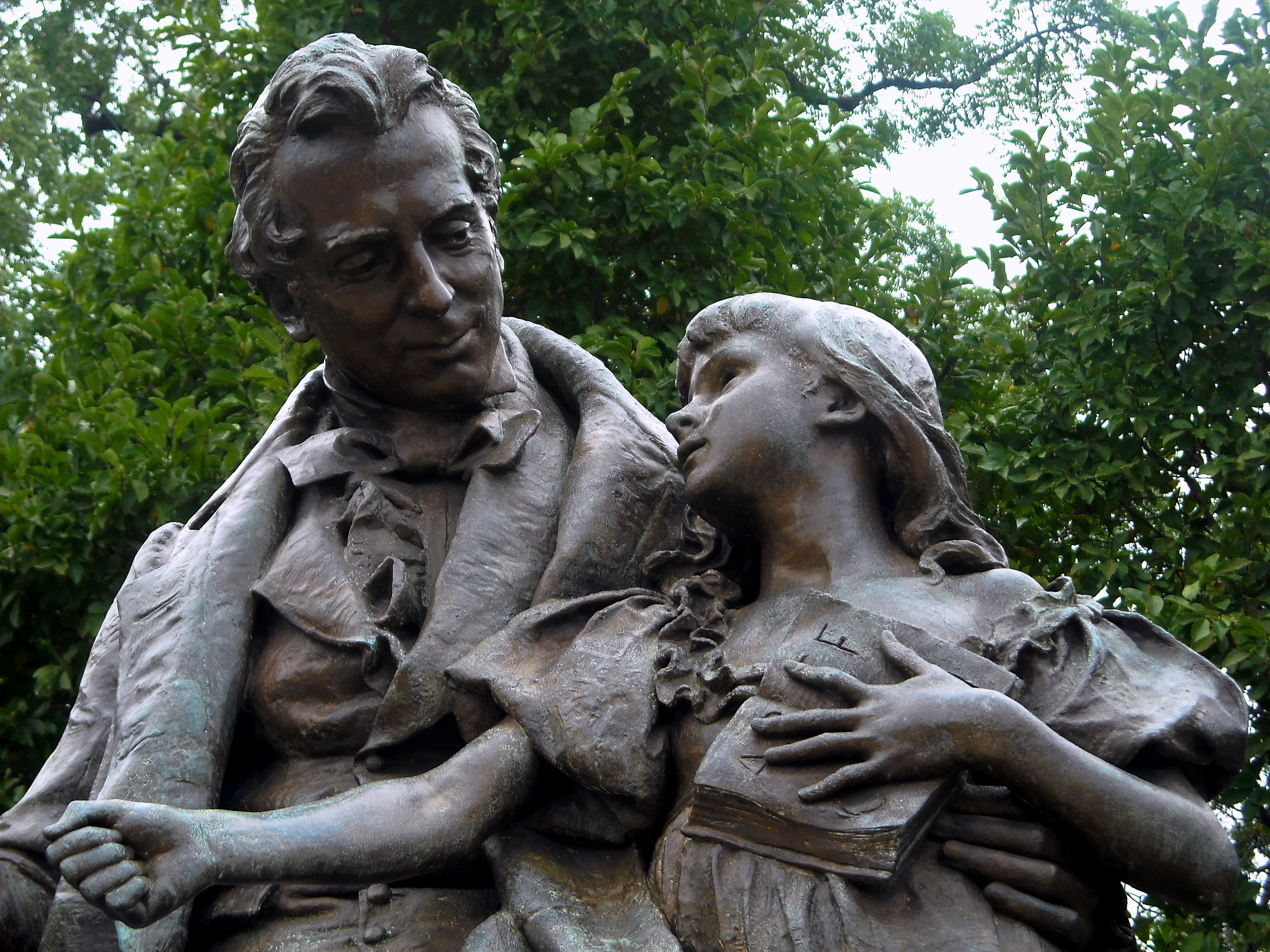
The Gallaudet Memorial at Gallaudet University features Cogswell

The Gallaudet Memorial, an 1889 statue of Gallaudet and Cogswell by Daniel Chester French, stands in front of Gallaudet University, depicting Gallaudet sitting on a chair and Cogswell standing next to him to share their communication of "A" in fingerspelling. A replica of this statue is on the campus of the American School for the Deaf at Hartford. The Alice Cogswell statue (American School for the Deaf Founders Memorial), by Frances Laughlin Wadsworth, also represents her as a young girl.

The Gallaudet University Alumni Association gives the Laurent Clerc Cultural Fund Alice Cogswell Award to people for valuable service on behalf of deaf citizens.

Cogswell is known as a remarkable figure in the history of Deaf culture, illustrating a breakthrough in Deaf education. She showed that the Deaf are capable of being taught and of high intelligence. Alice stands as an example of Frederick C. Schreiber's famous quote, "Deaf people can do anything hearing people can do, except hear."

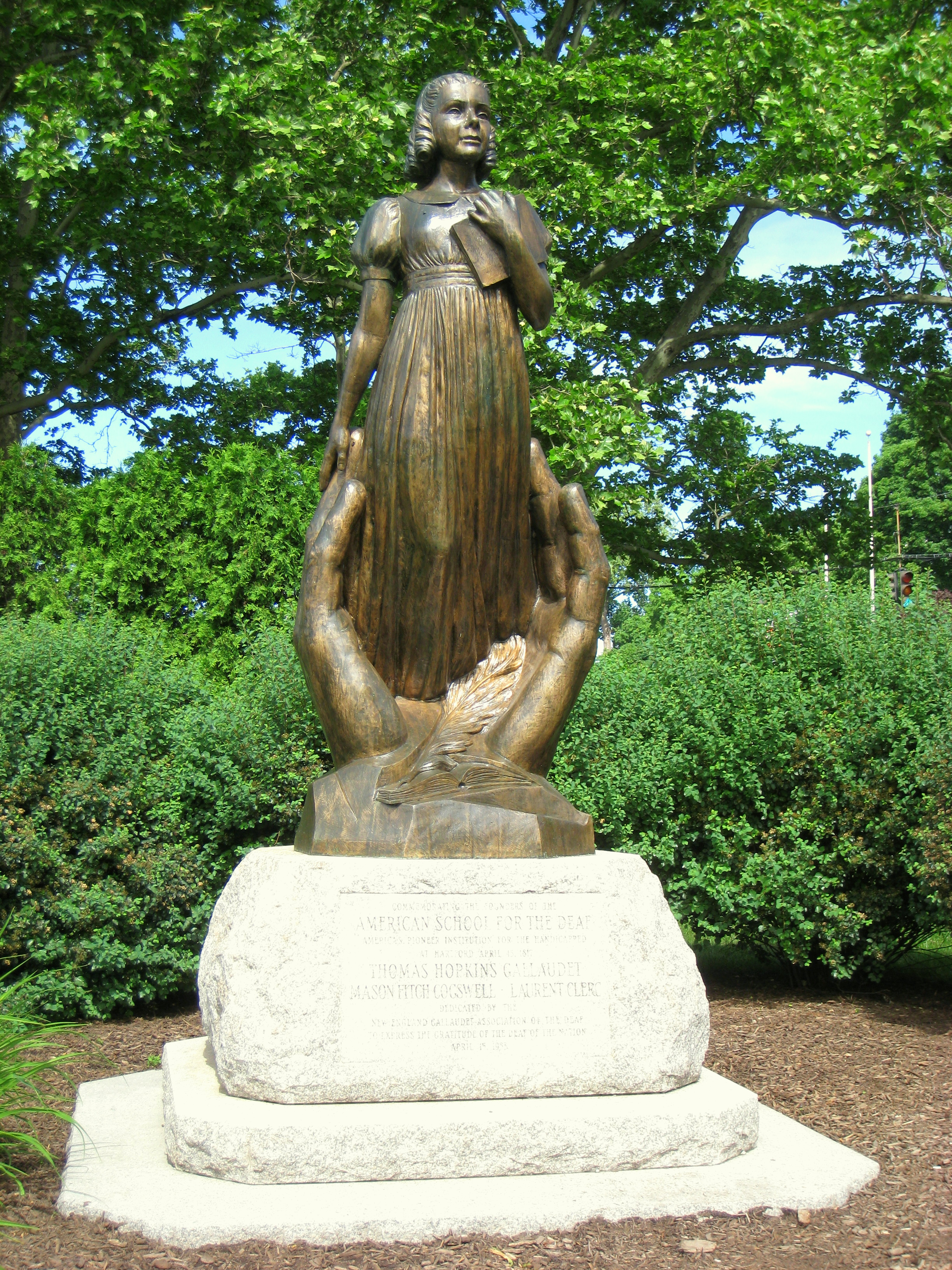
Alice Cogswell statue, Hartford
