= Flournoy =

Flournoy may refer to:

- Flournoy, California, census-designated place in Tehama County
- Flournoy Township, Thurston County, Nebraska, township
- Flournoy Valley Airport, private Airport in Roseburg, Oregon
- Flournoy (surname)

== People with the first name ==
- Flournoy Eakin Miller (1885–1971), African American composer, singer, writer, and actor (Miller and Lyles)
- James Flournoy Holmes, album-cover artist
- John Flournoy Henry (1793–1873), U.S. Representative from Kentucky
- John Flournoy Montgomery (1878–1954), American businessman and diplomat
- Thomas Flournoy Foster (1790–1848), American politician and lawyer
