= Thomas Gallaudet (priest) =

American Episcopal priest (1822–1902)

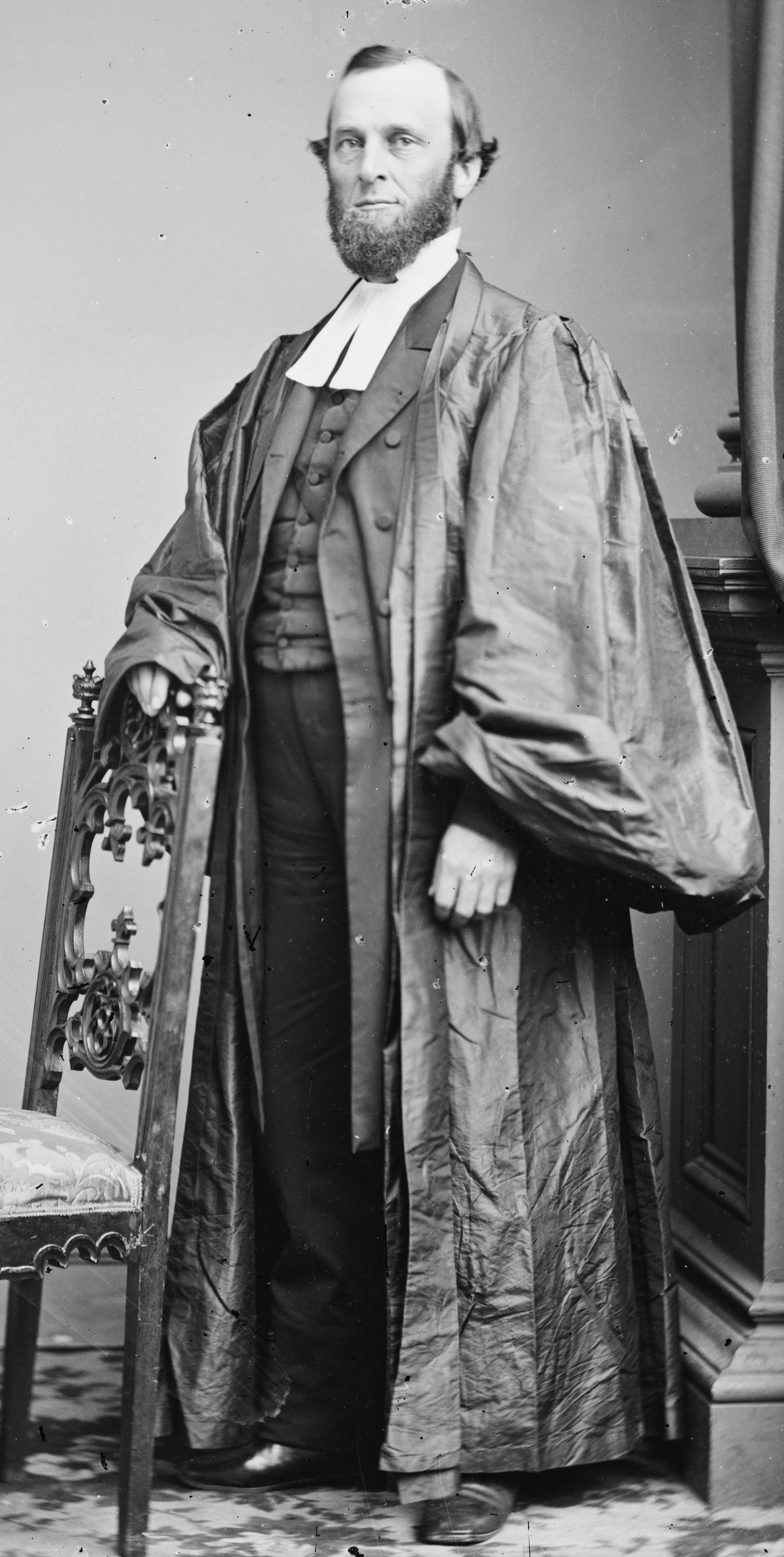
- Photograph of Thomas Gallaudet.
- Born: June 3, 1822; Hartford, Connecticut, US
- Died: August 27, 1902 (aged 80); New York, New York, US
- Occupation: Episcopal priest
- Spouse: Elizabeth Budd

Thomas Gallaudet (June 3, 1822 – August 27, 1902), an American Episcopal priest, was born in Hartford, Connecticut. His father, Thomas Hopkins Gallaudet, was the renowned pioneer of deaf education in the United States. His mother, Sophia Fowler Gallaudet, who was deaf, was the founding matron of the school that became Gallaudet University. His brother, Edward Miner Gallaudet, was founder and President of the university.

== Biography ==
After graduating from Trinity College in Hartford, Connecticut, Gallaudet accepted a teaching position at the New York Institution for Deaf-mutes, where he met and married a deaf woman, Elizabeth Budd. They had seven children, one of whom died in infancy, named Laurent Clerc Gallaudet. He was most certainly named after the man his father brought back from France to help start his deaf-mute school, Laurent Clerc.

Following in his father's footsteps, in 1852, Gallaudet established St. Ann's Church for Deaf Mutes in New York City.

In 1872 Gallaudet, Jane Middleton, and the Church Mission to Deaf-Mutes established the Home for Aged and Infirm Deaf-Mutes in a brownstone located at 220 East 13th Street in New York City. Jane served as the first Superintendent and Matron of the home from 1872 until her death in 1885.

In 1886, after years of hard work and fund raising, the Home was moved to Poughkeepsie and was renamed the Gallaudet Home for Deaf-Mutes.

Gallaudet was also instrumental in the work of the Sisterhood of the Good Shepherd, a group of women engaged in urban ministry in and around New York City.

One of Gallaudet's students, Henry Winter Syle, became the first deaf person to be ordained by the Episcopal Church. Both Gallaudet and Syle are listed in the Episcopal Church's Calendar of Saints for August 27.

Gallaudet is buried in Cedar Hill Cemetery in Hartford, Connecticut.
