= Mason Fitch Cogswell =

American physician (1761–1830)

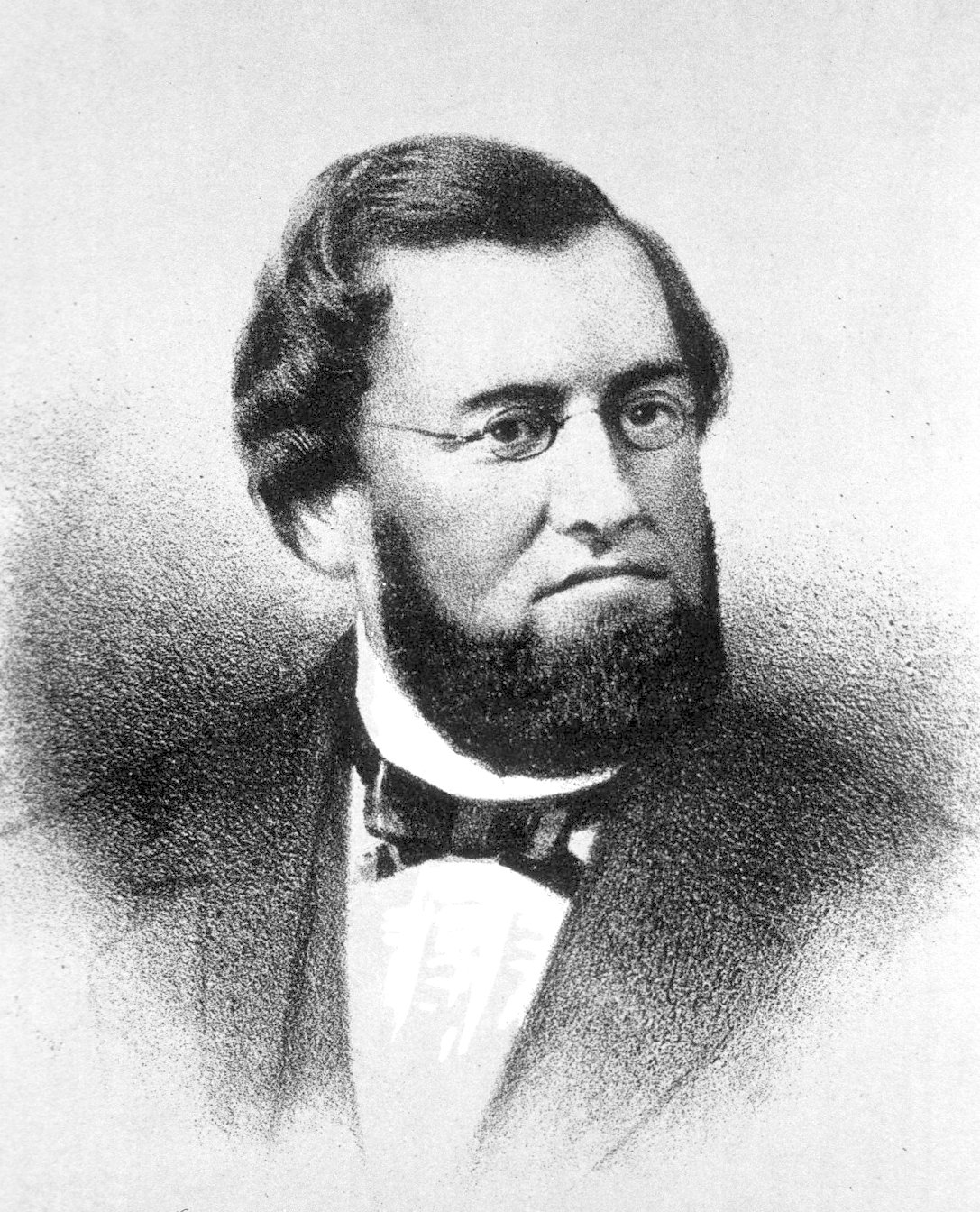
Mason Fitch Cogswell

Mason Fitch Cogswell (1761–1830) was an American medical doctor who pioneered education for the deaf. Cogwell's daughter, Alice Cogswell, was deaf after the age of two, prompting Cogswell to jointly establish the American School for the Deaf in Hartford, Connecticut.

== Biography ==
Cogswell was born on 28 September 1761 in Canterbury, Connecticut, the third son of the Reverend James Cogswell and Alice Fitch. His mother died when he was 11 years old; after this his father moved to New Scotland Parish in Windham and later remarried. Cogswell was left in the care of Samuel Huntington, president of the Continental Congress and governor of Connecticut. Cogswell matriculated and graduated as valedictorian from Yale in 1780. At Yale, he was a member of the debating society, Brothers in Unity. He studied medicine with his brother James at the soldiers' hospital in New York City during the American Revolution, and eventually became one of the best known surgeons in the country. He was one of the first in the United States to remove a cataract from the eye, and the first American to tie the carotid artery (1803). Cogswell was close to the Hartford Wits, a group of young writers from Connecticut. He died of pneumonia in 1830 in Hartford.

Cogswell is a highly influential person within American Deaf cultural history. His daughter, Alice, became deaf at the age of two as a result of surviving spotted fever. Though highly intelligent, her intellectual progress was slow. At this point, there was no established educational system for deaf children, nor was there an established official language of the deaf. Though there did exist signed languages within the United States, such as Martha's Vineyard Sign Language, none were standardized across the country. Cogswell eventually had his neighbor Thomas Hopkins Gallaudet travel to Europe to learn and bring back methods in instruction for the deaf. Gallaudet first traveled to England, where an oral method was generally used, but was unable to gain access to instruction methods. He then traveled to France, where the educational system instead focused on use of French Sign Language as an instructional method. He eventually traveled back with French teacher Laurent Clerc who brought French Sign Language to the United States.

With their return, Cogswell assisted in the founding of the first permanent school for the deaf in North America – the American School for the Deaf – in Hartford, Connecticut, in which his daughter was the first pupil.
