= Flournoy (surname) =

Flournoy is a surname. Notable people with the surname include:

- Angela Flournoy, American novelist
- Anne Flournoy (born 1952), American writer, producer and film director
- Craig Flournoy (born 1951), American journalist, Pulitzer Prize winner
- Fabulous Flournoy (born 1973), basketball player and coach
- Harry Flournoy (1943–2016), college basketball player
- Houston I. Flournoy (1929–2008), California State Controller and professor of public administration
- John Flournoy (1808–1879), American deaf activist
- Michèle Flournoy (born 1961), Under Secretary of Defense for Policy of the United States
- Nancy Flournoy (born 1947), American statistician
- Peggy Flournoy (1904–1972), American football and baseball player and coach
- Robert Flournoy, American politician and judge
- Ryan Flournoy (born 1999), American football player
- Samuel Lightfoot Flournoy (West Virginia lawyer) (1886–1961), American lawyer and politician
- Samuel Lightfoot Flournoy (West Virginia senator) (1846–1904), American lawyer and politician
- Terri Williams-Flournoy (born 1969), college basketball coach
- Théodore Flournoy (1854–1920), Swiss psychologist
- Thomas Flournoy (1811–1883), U.S. Representative from Virginia and cavalry officer in the Confederate States Army
- Willis Flournoy (1895–1964), African-American baseball pitcher

== See also ==
- Flournoy (disambiguation)
