= Keith Wann =

American actor

- Born: 1969 (age 56–57)
- Occupations: Stage actor, comedian
- Website: www.keithwann.com

Keith Wann is an American comedian and performance artist.

== Early life ==
Wann is the child of two deaf adults and was born in 1969.

== Performing artist ==
Wann is a performing ASL artist and has been featured in several short films with ASL. He currently stars in a popular ASL Children's book iTunes APP, is also a writer/actor for "Sign It! American Sign Language Made Easy" (a new Signing Time Foundation project), and has done the annual "Read for the Record" story since 2009. Wann has also done several commercials for Pepsi, appeared in Law & Order, Quantico, and several short films, and he travels the United States performing almost every weekend with his solo show and the ASL Comedy Tour.

Along with performing, Wann also teaches workshops and maintains his National Certification as an interpreter, NIC:Master and CI/CT and has been an artistic ASL consultant on video projects including the artist Sia.

== Career ==
Wann uses his American Sign Language knowledge in performance art.

Wann has interpreted several Broadway shows including School of Rock, Noises Off, West Side Story, Shrek: The Musical; Little Shop Of Horrors, Hamlet, Beauty and the Beast, and 39 Steps. He holds CI CT and NIC:Master certifications and teaches interpreting workshops focusing on Storytelling Surrogates and Improvisation for ASL Students. He also worked with Sia on her music video “Soon We'll Be Found”, appeared in several short movies, was an extra on several TV shows, and starred in a series of online Super Bowl commercials featuring sign language. As an ASL performer since 2002, he has produced several solo shows and hosted the ASL Comedy Tour 10 years in a row but now focuses on storytelling for Deaf children in the annual Read for the Record event. He is currently involved with the Signing Time Foundation producing, writing, and acting in "Sign It ASL" which is an online ASL course for adults. He is also making appearances in a popular Signed Stories App hosted by itv. He completed TDF's Interpreting in the Theatre Program at the Juilliard School in 2007.
