= Elliot Norton =

American theatre critic (1903–2003)

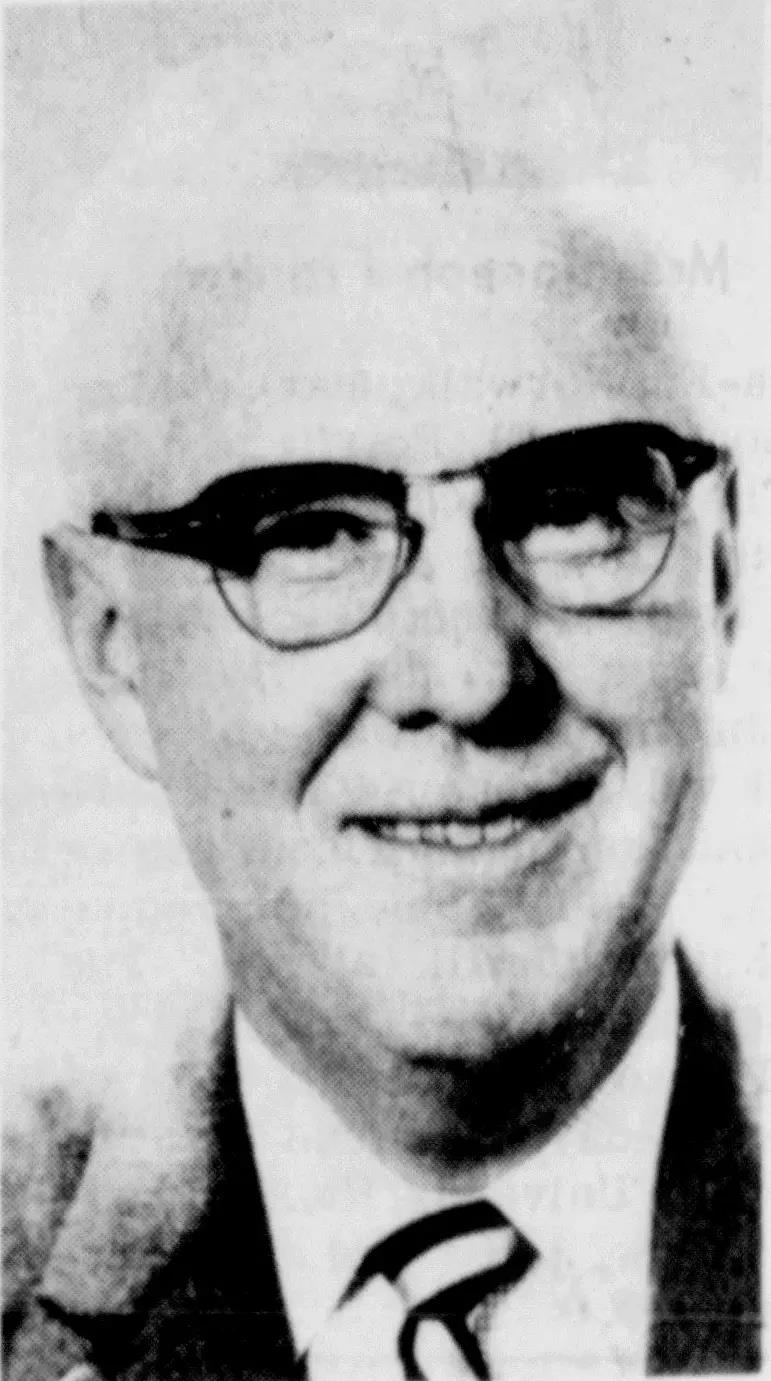
- Norton in 1964
- Born: William Elliot Norton; May 17, 1903; Boston, Massachusetts, U.S.
- Died: July 20, 2003 (aged 100); Fort Lauderdale, Florida, U.S.
- Resting place: Mount Auburn Cemetery
- Education: Harvard University
- Occupation: Theatre critic
- Years active: 1934–1982
- Spouse: Florence Stelmach (died 1996)
- Children: 3

William Elliot Norton (May 17, 1903 – July 20, 2003) was an American theater critic. In a half-century career spanning across various Boston newspapers, he authored 6,000 reviews and became one of the most influential regional theater critics in the country, gaining the moniker "The Dean of American Theatre Critics". Reflecting Boston's historic status as a major pre-Broadway tryout town, Norton practiced a style of criticism known as "play doctoring", where he made suggestions on how to improve a show; his criticism was taken seriously by producers, directors and playwrights, including Joshua Logan, Mike Nichols, and Neil Simon. He also hosted a show on WGBH-TV from 1958 to 1982, and taught at Boston College, Boston University, and Emerson College.

Norton was called "the most valuable critic in America" by producer Alexander Cohen. According to Logan:

Elliot had an absolute dead eye for a play. He could see it once and form an opinion that struck at the very core. He was very helpful to me on every show I brought to Boston. He had a gentlemanly manner, and even if what he had to say was rough, he could tell you without breaking your heart.

In his book Broadway Down East: An Informal Account of the Plays, Players, and Playhouses of Boston from Puritan Times to the Present, Norton recounts the history of Boston theater as it became:

…a city where plays and musicals are tested, prepared, often revised, and made ready, not for us but very often at our expense, for New York.

== Early life ==
Born William Elliot Norton in Boston to William L. Norton and Mary (Fitzgerald) Norton, he attended Harvard College (Class of 1926) after graduating from the Boston Latin School. At Harvard College, he took George Pierce Baker's class for dramatists. Baker's most famous student was Eugene O'Neill, whose plays were revolutionizing Broadway theater at the time Norton became a drama critic. Norton had been interested in theater before he was interested in writing. “I can remember Barrymore's stabbing the king [in Hamlet in 1922] as vividly as if it were yesterday; it still raises the hair on the back on my hands,” he said.

== Journalism career ==
Norton began his career as a newspaperman with The Boston Post after graduating from Harvard in 1926. By 1934, he was promoted from reporter to the editor of the drama section, where he began to make his name as a critic. The Post went out of business in 1956, and Norton was hired by the Boston Record American, which evolved into the Boston Herald American, which eventually became the Boston Herald after he retired in 1982.

In addition to his newspaper reviews, he was a television critic on Boston television, including public TV station WGBH, where he hosted Elliot Norton Reviews. The show ran for 1,100 episodes from 1958 to 1982.

== Play doctor ==
Norton practiced drama criticism when the relationship between the regional critic and playwrights whose shows were undergoing tryouts in their towns were not as adversarial as they were to become. Frank Rich, who became prominent as a theater critic for The New York Times, wrote about how Norton's role as a "play doctor" was part of its times:

What people should remember was that in his heyday ... the Josh Logans and Rodgers and Hammersteins looked to out-of-town critics for informed advice about how to 'fix their shows.' Critics like Norton relished playing the role. They went back to see plays at the end of the run and that was just the way the Broadway theater worked. Newspapers and audiences accepted it as part of the process as critics would write columns that combined repertorial, critical, and advice-giving elements. It would be considered highly inappropriate today to talk to the writers and producers outside of columns, but it was a different world.

Two major theatrical successes that Norton was credited with midwifing while they were in their Boston tryouts were Oklahoma! and The Odd Couple.

=== Oklahoma! ===
Norton helped shape the first collaboration between Richard Rodgers and Oscar Hammerstein II during the tryout of as Away We Go at Boston's Colonial Theatre. Norton provided input through his printed criticism and informally. Retitled Oklahoma! when it opened on Broadway, the musical not only was a smash but helped change the face of American musical theater.

=== The Odd Couple ===
Neil Simon said that Norton's criticism of The Odd Couple helped him improve the play. Appearing on the show Eliott Norton Reviews, in his conversation with Simon, Elliott said that the play went "flat" in its final act. As it appeared originally in Boston, the characters the Pidgeon Sisters did not appear in the final act.

Simon told The Boston Globe:

He invited one of the stars and the writer. He loved the play and gave it a wonderful review but he said the third act was lacking something. On the show he said, 'You know who I missed in the third act was the Pidgeon Sisters,' and it was like a light bulb went off in my head. It made an enormous difference in the play. I rewrote it and it worked very well. I was so grateful to Elliot ... Elliot had such a keen eye. I don't know if he saved the play or not, but he made it a bigger success.

== Honors ==
Norton received the George Jean Nathan Award for drama criticism in 1964 and a Special Tony Award for distinguished commentary in 1971. He was elected a Fellow of the American Academy of Arts and Sciences in 1966. His show, Elliot Norton Reviews, received the Peabody Award, one of television's greatest honors.

The year he retired in 1982, he was honored by the establishment of the Elliot Norton Awards to recognize theatrical excellence in the Boston theater. The American Theater Critics Association inducted him into the Theater Hall of Fame in 1988.

== Personal life and death ==
Norton and his wife, Florence (née Stelmach; d. 1996), had three children. In 2002, he moved from Watertown, Massachusetts, to Fort Lauderdale, Florida, to be closer to family. He died there on July 20, 2003, at the age of 100, and was buried at Mount Auburn Cemetery, in Cambridge.

== Publications ==
- Broadway Down East: An Informal Account of the Plays, Players, and Playhouses of Boston from Puritan Times to the Present (1978)
