= Jane Middleton =

English-born American philanthropist (1818–1885)

Jane Middleton (December 24, 1818 — July 30, 1885) was an English-born American philanthropist, one of the founders and superintendent of the first Home for Aged and Infirm Deaf-Mutes in New York City, located at 220 East 13th Street, from its inception in 1872 until her death in 1885.

== Early life ==
Jane Middleton was born in 1818, the eldest child of Robert and Ann Middleton. Her father was a druggist, and the family lived in Manchester, England prior to coming to the United States in 1839.

== Career ==
Jane Middleton was employed as matron at the Ohio State School for the Blind during 1845 and 1846. In that capacity Jane worked for William Chapin (1802 – 1888). Upon Chapin's departure from his post, Jane also resigned.

Upon arrival in New York City, she began work as matron of the Female Christian Home. After years of running boarding houses for Christian young women and men, Jane Middleton opened a home for aged deaf-mutes, the first such establishment in the country. Jane elicited the assistance of Rev. Gallaudet who ran the Church Mission to Deaf Mutes at St. Ann's Church for the Deaf in New York City. In 1872 the transition was complete and Jane became the Home's superintendent, and would continue this work until her death in 1885, apparently without pay.

The First Annual Report of the Trustees of the Church Mission To Deaf-Mutes noted in 1873 that the society had founded a home for elderly and ill deaf-mutes at 220 East Thirteenth Street, New York, under the care of Miss Jane Middleton. Middleton arranged for several local private physicians, along with doctors at the New York Eye and Ear Infirmary also located at 2nd Avenue and 13th Street, to donate their time and services to the Home.

The Home offered its residents picnics, literary excursions and holiday observances. A New York Herald reporter described an 1878 visit in glowing terms. Visitors from both the local deaf community, and those visiting from other cities often stopped to call. These visits were often reported in the newspapers, along with an appeal for funds and donations of needed clothing and other goods.

== Legacy ==
Jane Middleton died suddenly of an "apoplectic attack" in summer 1885, while working in New York City. Her funeral on August 2 that year was held at St. Ann's Church, with a eulogy by the Rev. Dr. Thomas Gallaudet. Her remains were interred at Woodlawn Cemetery in the Bronx.

Soon after Miss Middleton's death the home was relocated to a farm near Poughkeepsie, New York, and was officially opened and renamed The Gallaudet Home for Deaf-Mutes. The residents of the original Home for Aged and Infirm Deaf-Mutes on East 13th Street moved to a home outside of New York City.
