= Elizabeth English Benson =

American educator for deaf students

- Born: September 5, 1904; Frederick, Maryland, U.S.
- Died: December 13, 1972 (aged 68); Frederick, Maryland, U.S.
- Education: George Washington University; Gallaudet College
- Occupations: Educator, interpreter

Elizabeth English Benson (1904–1972) was an American educator for deaf students who taught at Gallaudet College for two decades before being named Dean of Women there. During World War II, she temporarily joined the military so she could help newly deafened soldiers injured in the war. Later she was an occasional interpreter for two U.S. presidents.

== Life and work ==
Benson was born September 5, 1904, in Frederick, Maryland to deaf parents, Harry and Minnie Benson, who worked at the nearby Maryland School for the Deaf. She was designated a CODA, a child of deaf adults. Out of necessity, she learned American Sign Language from an early age to communicate with them. At two, she was pictured with her sister and parents in the popular deaf newspaper, The Silent Worker (May 1906, vol. 18, no. 8), which regularly featured "typical children of deaf parents."

=== Education ===
Benson earned her B.A. from George Washington University; M.A. from Gallaudet College; honorary doctorate from Gallaudet, 1962; LL.B. from George Washington School of Law.

=== Teaching ===
She joined the faculty at Gallaudet in 1926 to teach graduate students audiology and lipreading and then became a regular faculty member. In 1950, she succeeded Dr. Elizabeth Peet as the Dean of Women and remained there until her retirement in 1970 after 44 years of service to the Gallaudet.

On her own, she taught in Virginia,

Her influence also extended beyond the Gallaudet Campus as she lent her considerable skills and knowledge to training African American instructors at the Hampton Institute in Virginia. She spent her summers helping to prepare those students to meet teaching certification requirements.

=== Wartime service ===
With the call to service during World War II, Benson left the university temporarily to join the American Women's Voluntary Services and, then the Women's Army Corps where she could "provide support and resources to newly deafened soldiers."

Even after the war and her return to the Gallaudet faculty, Benson sometimes acted as an interpreter for influential figures in Washington, D.C., including Presidents John F. Kennedy and Lyndon B. Johnson. Around the same time, she decided to earn a law degree "so that she might better serve deaf people in the courtroom."

Benson died in Frederick on December 13, 1972.

== Legacy ==
- Benson was inducted as a member of the Gallaudet College Hall of Fame (date unknown)
- Gallaudet University's first co-ed dormitory on campus, built in 1972, was named in her honor.
- Barracks at Fort Sam Houston were named in her honor in 2014.
- The Elizabeth Benson Scholarship Award by Registry of Interpreters for the Deaf, was named in her honor.

== Selected works ==
- Benson, E. E. (1920). Systematic gymnastics: an aid to speech, Gallaudet College.
- Benson, E. E. (1932). A survey of the occupations of the graduates and ex-students of Gallaudet College.
- Benson, E. E., Young, J. P., & Virginia State School. (1954). Virginia State College summer study program for teachers of the deaf: Report. Hampton, Va.
- Benson, E. E. (1958). The language of signs. (Place of publication not identified: publisher not identified.)
- Benson, E. E., & St. Paul Technical-Vocational Institute. (1964). Sign language. St. Paul, Minn.: Technical Vocational Institute. (book)
