= Sophia Fowler Gallaudet =

American Deaf educator (1798–1877)

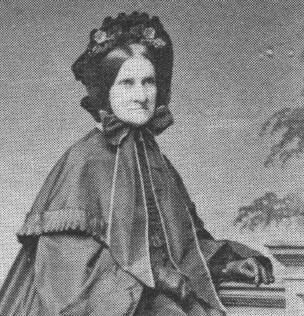
- Gallaudet in the 1850s
- Born: Sophia Fowler; March 20, 1798
- Died: May 13, 1877 (aged 79)
- Resting place: Cedar Hill Cemetery
- Occupation: Matron
- Years active: 1857–1866
- Spouse: Thomas Hopkins Gallaudet (m. 1821)
- Children: 8

Sophia Fowler Gallaudet (March 20, 1798 – May 13, 1877) was the wife of Thomas Hopkins Gallaudet. As the founding matron of the school that became Gallaudet University, she played an important role in deaf history, even playing a key role in lobbying US congressmen in the effort to establish Gallaudet (then the "National Deaf-Mute College"). She was appointed to be the first matron of the Columbia Institution on May 30, 1857, and held the position for nine years, until August 1, 1866.

== Biography ==
She was born as Sophia Fowler near the town of Guilford, Connecticut, on March 20, 1798, to Miner Fowler and Rachel Hall. Born deaf, she first attended school at age 19, starting (along with her sister Parnel) at the new school for the Deaf in Hartford in 1817 and continued her studies until the Spring of 1821. While she was a student there she became engaged to the principal of the school, Thomas Hopkins Gallaudet.

She married Thomas on August 29, 1821, and had eight children: Thomas (1822–1902), Sophia (1824–1865), Peter Wallace (1827–1903), Jane Hall (1827–1853), William Lewis (1829–1887), Catherine "Kate" Fowler (1831–1917), and Edward Miner (1837–1917).

She died on May 13, 1877, in Washington, District of Columbia, and was interred in Cedar Hill Cemetery in Hartford, Connecticut.

Sophia Fowler Gallaudet, named as the "Mother of the American Deaf," was honored and memorialized in Angeline Fuller Fischer's The Silent Worker, in 1915, to remind young deaf people of her influences that has pervaded Gallaudet College for so many years, and of her contributions to its early growth as an institution of higher education.

A bronze memorial tablet, sculpted by Eugene Hannan, was unveiled in Guilford in 1917. The tablet was to recognize her important role in contributing to the America School for the Deaf, which her husband, Thomas Hopkins Gallaudet, is a co-founder of and helping to establish Gallaudet College, which her son, Edward Miner Gallaudet is a founder of.
