= John Flournoy =

John Jacobus Flournoy (1808–1879), a graduate of the American School for the Deaf, is best remembered as an advocate for a deaf state and for his resistance to abolition of slavery in the United States.

Living near Athens, Georgia throughout his life. Besides being deaf himself, Flournoy also had occasional bouts of mental instability, and was frequently institutionalized.

Flournoy proposed that deaf people obtain a government land grant to establish a colony "where all of its citizens would be deaf and the chief means of communication would be sign language." Flournoy's proposals were not widely accepted even among deaf leaders of the day. Most argued that such a colony could not flourish because of the low percentage of deaf children born to deaf parents. Flournoy was also a driving force in the creation of the Georgia School for the Deaf and a proponent of a national college for the deaf.

He also notably championed the expulsion of all African-American slaves from the United States on grounds of their supposed inferiority to the white race. Several letters from Flournoy to the black abolitionist Frederick Douglass were printed in the latter's paper, entitled The North Star. In these letters, Flournoy excoriated free blacks for their presumed arrogance to southern and northern whites, charging them with resistance to God's divine plan for the African race to remain inferior, and advising them to move permanently to the colony of Liberia.
