= Thomas Hopkins Gallaudet =

American educator (1787–1851)

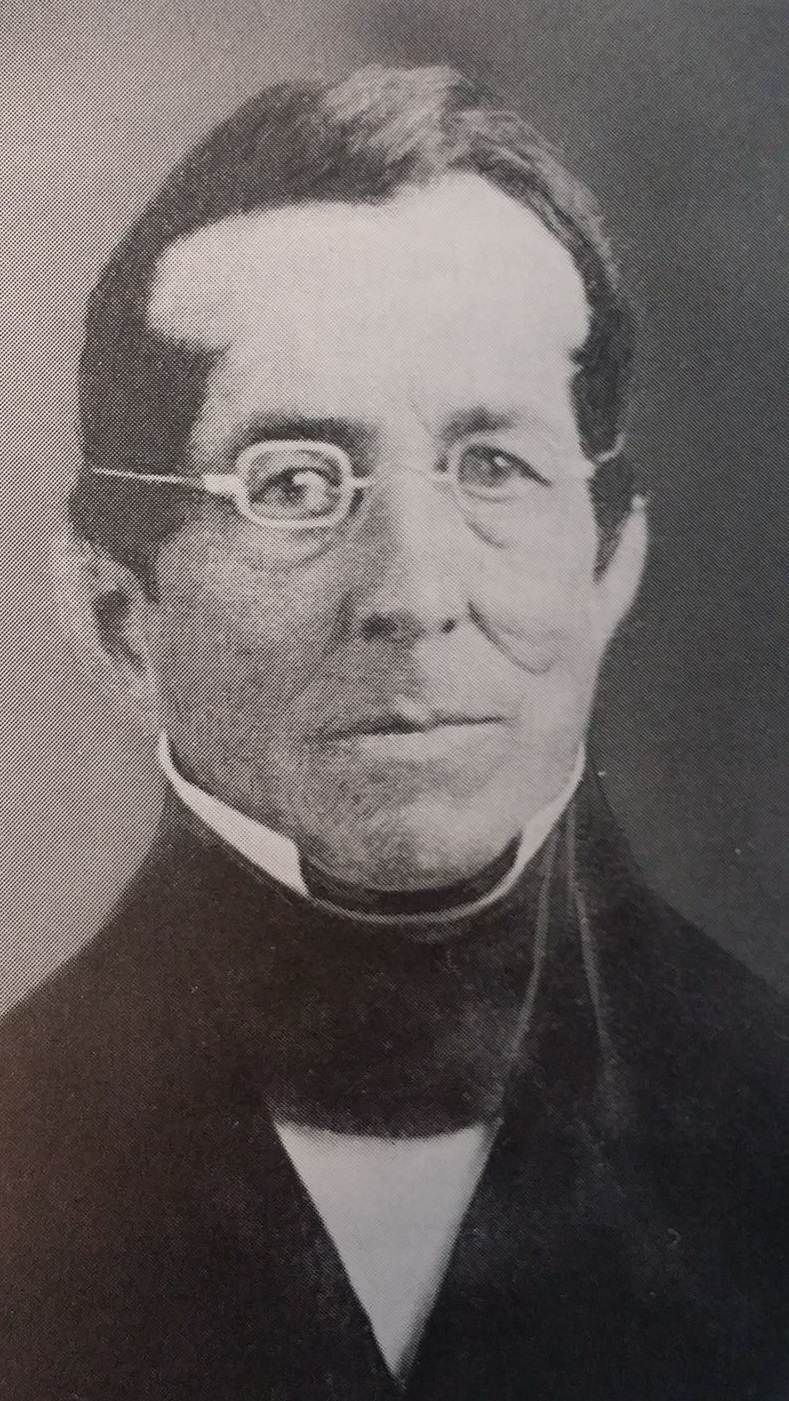
- Born: December 10, 1787; Philadelphia, Pennsylvania, US
- Died: September 10, 1851 (aged 63); Hartford, Connecticut, US
- Education: Yale University; Andover Theological Seminary
- Occupations: Minister, educator, co-founder of the first permanent school for the deaf in North America.
- Spouse: Sophia Fowler

Thomas Hopkins Gallaudet (December 10, 1787 – September 10, 1851) was an American educator. Along with Laurent Clerc and Mason Cogswell, he co-founded the first permanent institution for the education of the deaf in North America, and he became its first principal. When opened on April 15, 1817, it was called the "Connecticut Asylum (at Hartford) for the Education and Instruction of Deaf and Dumb Persons", but it is now known as the American School for the Deaf.

== Biography ==
Gallaudet attended Yale University, graduating at seventeen with a bachelor's degree with highest honors in 1805. He stayed on to earn a master's degree at Yale in 1808.

Gallaudet engaged in many things, such as studying law, trade, and theology. In 1814, Gallaudet graduated from Andover Theological Seminary after a two-year course of study. However, he declined several offers of pastorates, due to ongoing concerns about his health.

== American School for the Deaf ==
Thomas Gallaudet met Alice Cogswell on May 25, 1814, the nine-year-old deaf daughter of a neighbor, Dr. Mason Cogswell. Gallaudet had returned to his parents' home in Hartford to recuperate from his seminary studies. On that day, as he observed Alice playing apart from other children, he wanted to teach her. Gallaudet started to teach Alice what different objects were called by writing their names and drawing pictures of them with a stick in the dirt.

Dr. Cogswell was impressed and invited Gallaudet to continue teaching Alice through the summer. While many of his friends became pastors or found mission fields overseas, Gallaudet found his mission field at home. (Note: Gallaudet later wrote to a friend that the deaf school stood "on the hell grounds." No other object than the salvation of the souls of the peoples can be named of the highest moment.)

In 1815 Dr. Cogswell, with several businessmen and clergy, asked Gallaudet to travel to Europe to study methods for teaching deaf students, especially those established by the Braidwood family in Scotland. Gallaudet found Robert Kinniburgh (head of Braidwood Academy at the time) unwilling to share knowledge of their oral communication method and himself financially limited. At the same time, he also was not satisfied that the oral method produced desirable results.

While still in the United Kingdom, he met Abbé Sicard in London, head of the Institution Nationale des Sourds-Muets à Paris, and two of its deaf faculty members, Laurent Clerc and Jean Massieu. Sicard invited Gallaudet to Paris to study the school's method of teaching the deaf using manual communication. Impressed with the manual method, Gallaudet studied teaching methodology under Sicard, learning sign language from Massieu and Clerc, who were both highly educated graduates of the school.

Having persuaded Clerc to accompany him, Gallaudet sailed back to America. The two men, with the help of Dr. Cogswell, toured New England and successfully raised private and public funds to fund a school for deaf students in Hartford, which later became known as the American School for the Deaf (ASD), in 1817. Young Alice was one of the first seven students at ASD.

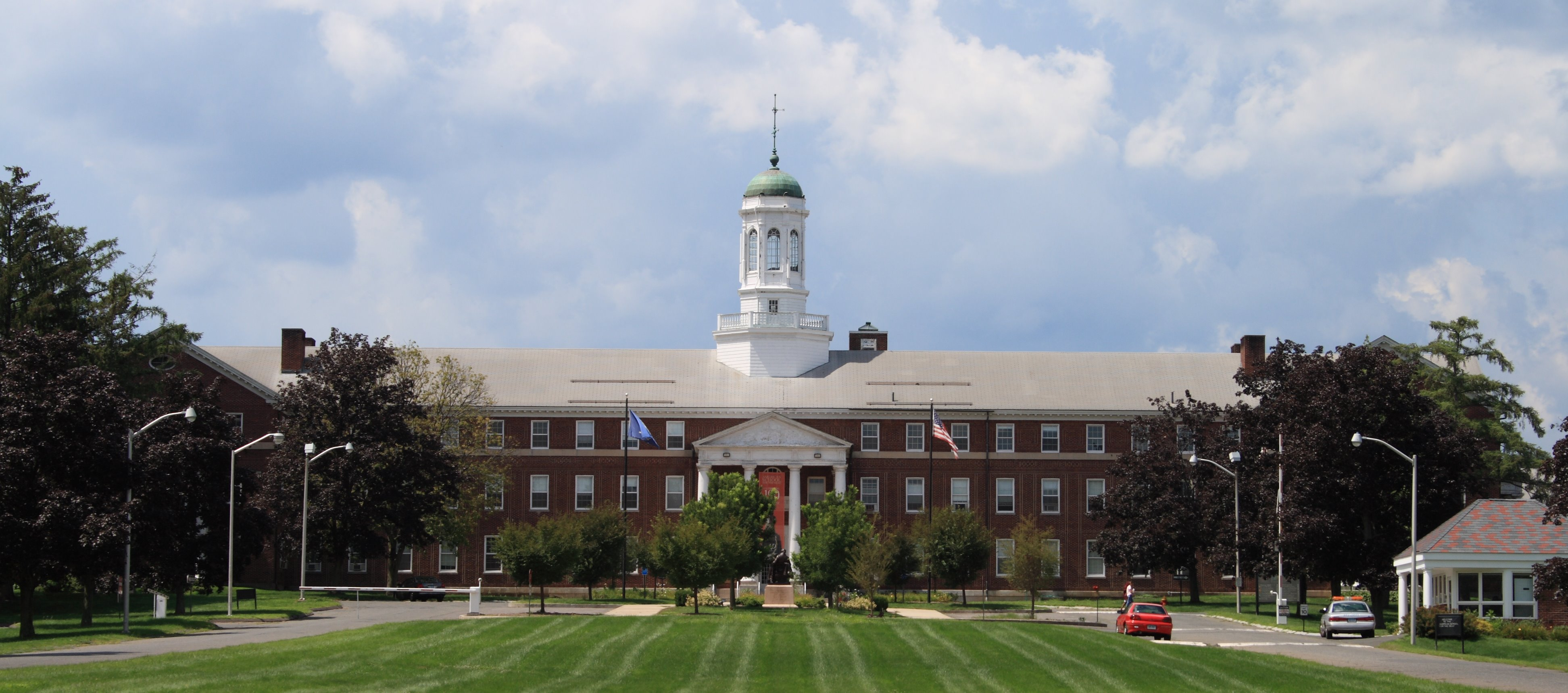
The school founded by Gallaudet in Hartford is now the American School for the Deaf

In 1821, he married one of his former students, Sophia Fowler and they had eight children together.

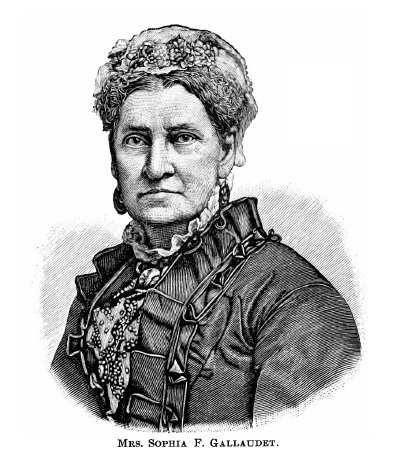
Sophia Fowler

After resigning directorship of his school for the deaf in 1830, Gallaudet wrote educational and religious texts, became the chaplain to the Connecticut Retreat for the Insane in 1838, and taught in Hartford; the young Frederic Edwin Church was a notable pupil during this period.

Thomas Hopkins Gallaudet died in Hartford on September 10, 1851, aged 63, and was buried in Hartford's Cedar Hill Cemetery.

== Family ==
In 1864, his youngest child Edward Miner Gallaudet (1837–1917) founded the first college for the deaf, which, in 1986, became Gallaudet University. He was president for 46 years. The university also offers education for those in elementary, middle, and high school. The elementary school on the Gallaudet University Campus is named the Kendall Demonstration Elementary School (KDES); the middle and high school is the Model Secondary School for the Deaf (MSSD).

Gallaudet had another son, Thomas Gallaudet, who became an Episcopal priest and also worked for the deaf.

Gallaudet's father, Peter Wallace Gallaudet, was a personal secretary to US President George Washington, when the office of the President was located in Philadelphia.

Thomas Hopkins Gallaudet was the eldest of 13 children. His younger siblings were: Edgar (1789–90), Charles (1792–1830), (unnamed twins, 1793), Catherine (1793–1856), James (1796–1878), William Edgar (1797–1821), Ann Watts (1800–1850), Jane (1801–1835), Theodore (1805–1885), Edward (1808–1847), and Wallace (1811–1816). William Edgar Gallaudet graduated from Yale with a B.A. in 1815.

== Legacy ==
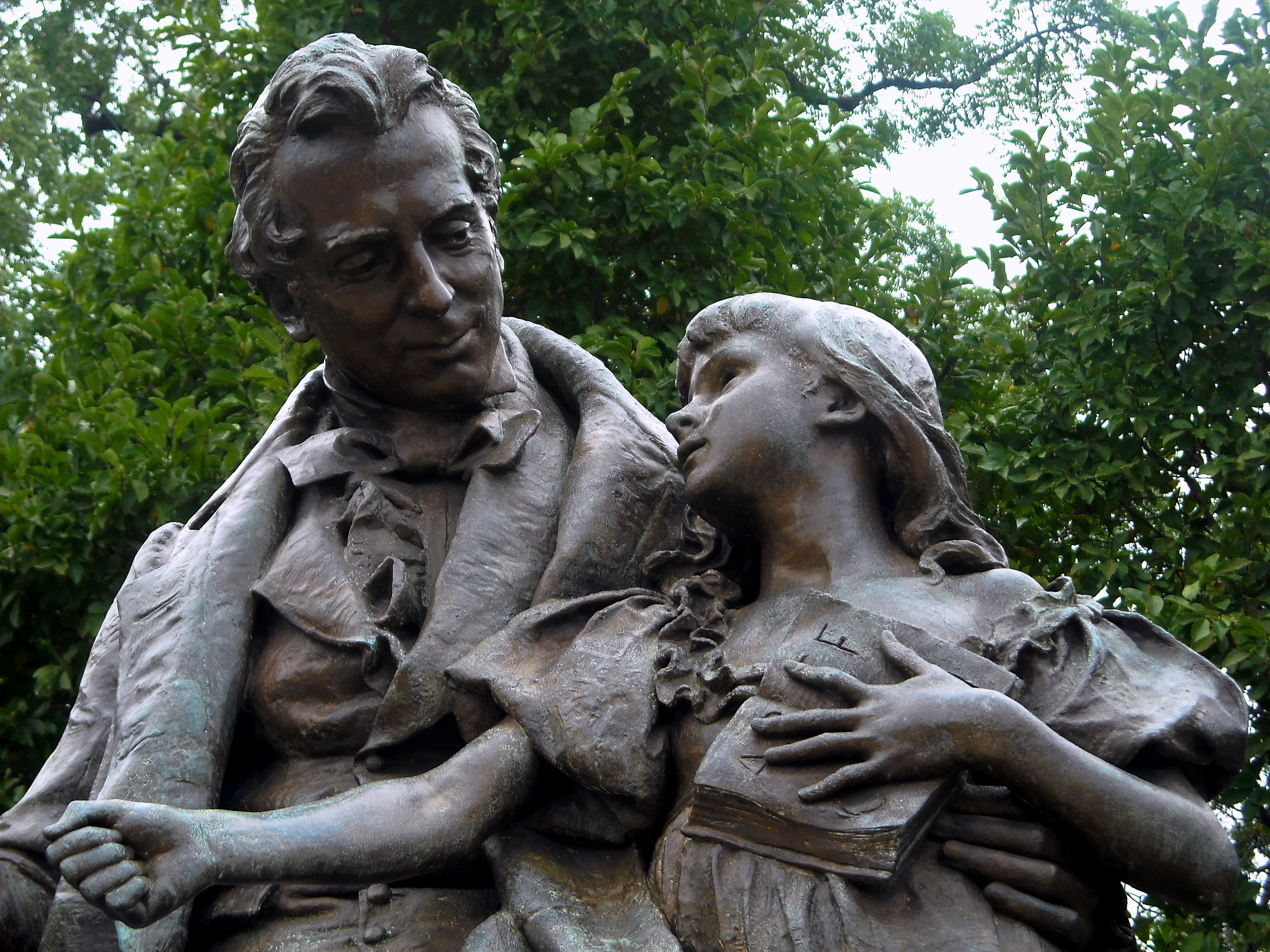
The Gallaudet Memorial at Gallaudet University

- Just days before his death, Gallaudet received an honorary Doctor of Laws degree from the Western Reserve College of Ohio.
- Gallaudet University was named in honor of him in 1894.
- A statue of Thomas Hopkins Gallaudet and Alice Cogswell created by Daniel Chester French sits at the front of Gallaudet University.
- A memorial honoring the 100th anniversary of Thomas Hopkins Gallaudet's birth was erected in 1887 at the American School for the Deaf.
- A Great Americans series 20¢ postage stamp was issued by the United States Postal Service in June 1983 to honor him.
- Gallaudet Hall, a residence hall at Central Connecticut State University in New Britain is named in his honor
- A residence hall named in his honor at the University of Hartford in West Hartford
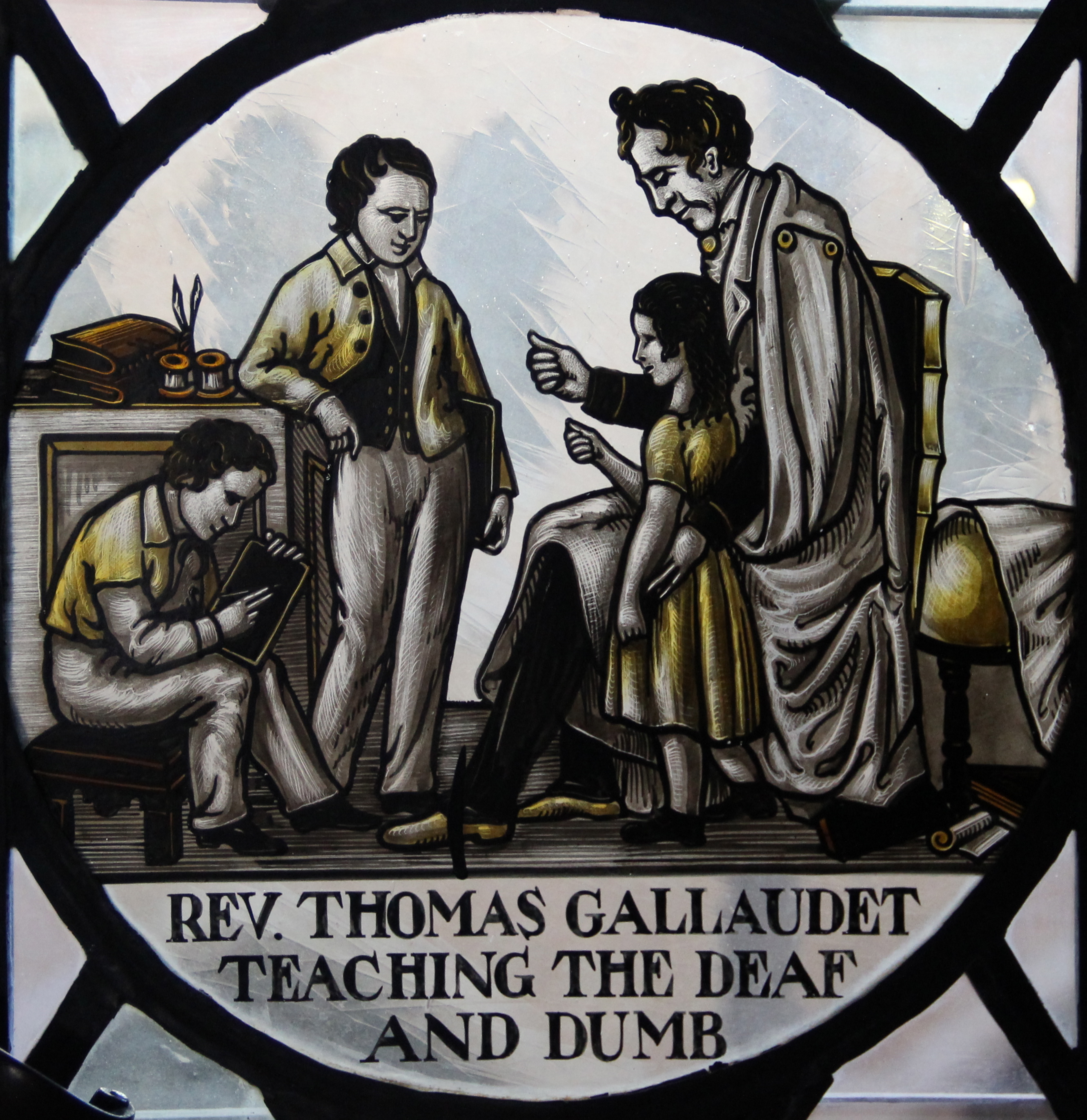
  A stained glass window at Yale's Sterling Memorial Library honoring Gallaudet and his work

== See also ==
- American Sign Language
- History of deaf education in the United States
- Gallaudet University
