= Edward Miner Gallaudet =

First president of Gallaudet University (1837–1917)

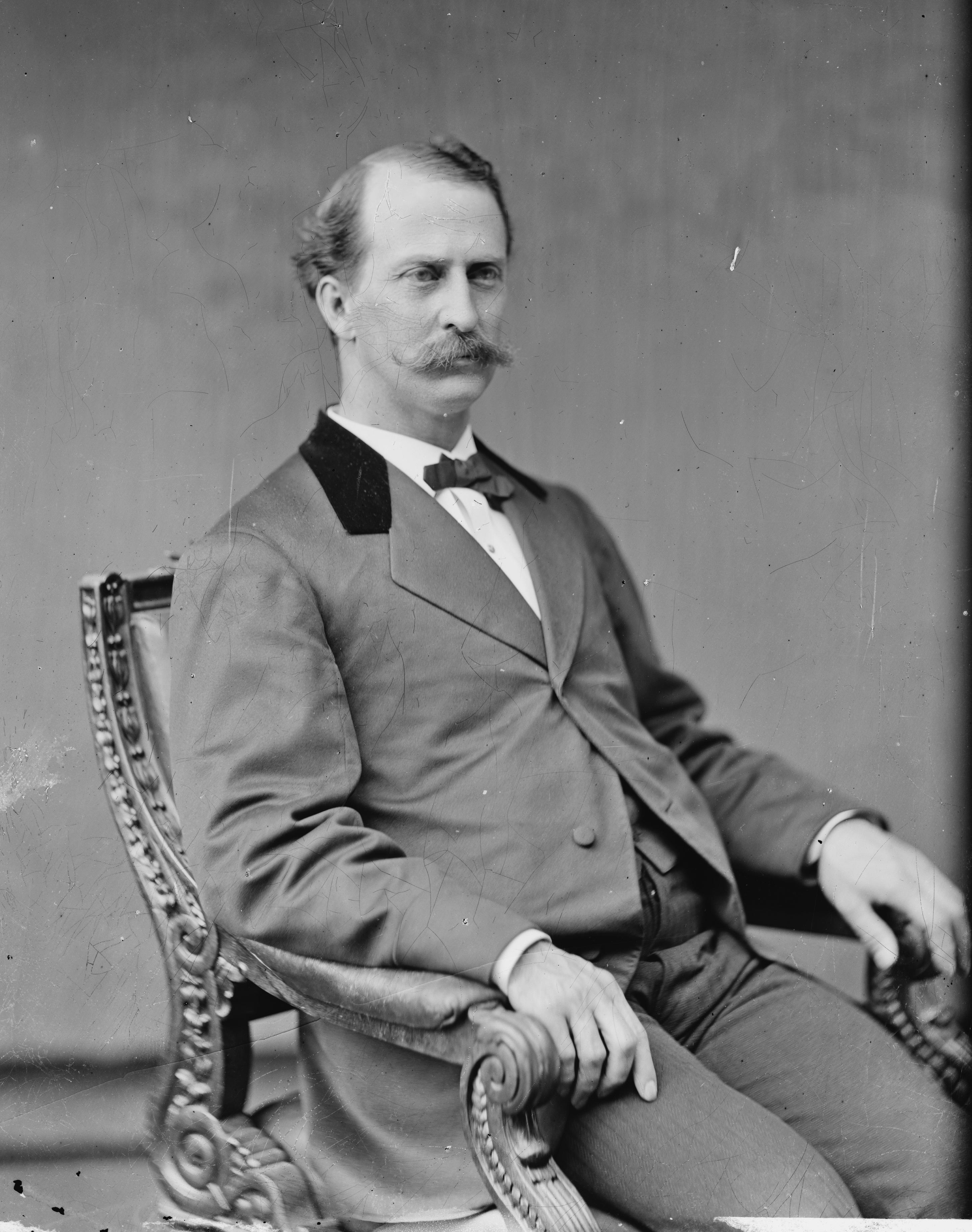
- Gallaudet, c. 1893

1st President of Gallaudet University
- In office April 8, 1864 – September 22, 1910
- Succeeded by: Percival Hall

Personal details
- Born: February 5, 1837 Hartford, Connecticut, U.S.
- Died: September 26, 1917 (aged 80) Hartford, Connecticut, U.S.
- Spouse(s): Jane M. Fessenden, 1858-1866 (d. 1866); Susan Denison, 1868-1903

Edward Miner Gallaudet (/ˌɡæləˈdɛt/ GAL-ə-DET; February 5, 1837 – September 26, 1917), was the first president of Gallaudet University in Washington, D.C. (then known as the Columbia Institution for the Instruction of the Deaf and Dumb and Blind from 1864 until 1894 and then Gallaudet College from 1894 to 1986) from 1864 to 1910.

== Biography ==
=== Early life ===
Edward Miner Gallaudet was the son of Thomas Hopkins Gallaudet and Sophia Fowler Gallaudet. While Edward was hearing, his mother Sophia was born deaf. As a youth, Edward enjoyed working with tools and also built an electrical machine. He kept birds, fowl, and rabbits, spending most of his time in the city, but occasionally venturing into the country.

His father co-founded the American School for the Deaf (ASD) in 1817, where American Sign Language emerged as a language. Edward had fond memories of climbing a hill with his father and his father introducing the subject of geometry to him. In 1851, when Edward was 14 and a recent graduate from Hartford High School in Hartford, Connecticut, his father died.

=== Career ===
Gallaudet worked at a bank for three years. However, he disliked the "narrowing effect" of the mental monotony of the work, and quit to go to work as a teacher at the school his father founded, He worked there two years, from 1855 to 1857.

While he was teaching, he continued his education at Trinity College in Hartford, completing his studies for a Bachelor of Science degree two years later.

Gallaudet was a member of the District of Columbia Society of the Sons of the American Revolution and served as the District Society's president from 1897 to 1899.

=== Family ===
Edson Fessenden Gallaudet, who was Gallaudet's fifth child (and second child with his second wife Susan) was an early pioneer in the field of aviation, being the first to experiment with wing warping, and the founder of the first aircraft factory in America.

== Gallaudet University ==
In 1857, Amos Kendall donated 2 acres (0.81 ha) of land for the establishment of a school for the deaf and blind in Washington, D.C., and asked Gallaudet to come to Washington to help lead this school. Edward agreed and became the first principal of the Columbia Institution for the Deaf.

Edward M. Gallaudet signing The Lorna Doone Country in ASL (1914)

In 1864, Gallaudet sought college status for the Columbia Institution and got it when President Abraham Lincoln signed a bill into law which authorized the Columbia Institution to confer college degrees—a law which was not strictly necessary, but which Gallaudet desired. This first college of the deaf eventually became Gallaudet University.

Gallaudet was the president of Gallaudet College/Columbia for 46 years (1864–1910), was the head administrator for 53 years (1857–1910), and was the president of the board of directors for 47 years (1864–1911). He was a staunch advocate of sign language. He recognized the value of speech training, but also recognized that speech training was not for everyone. Although he initially preferred manualism, stating that sign language was the "natural language of deaf people", throughout his life he came to believe that students should be educated using whichever method fit their specific needs—which could include speech training. He concluded, "no one method is suited to the conditions of all the deaf". Still, he sometimes referred to oralism as the "artificial method" and deemed that it was only a "partial success".

== Death ==
After retiring as president of Gallaudet College, Gallaudet returned to Hartford, and died on September 26, 1917.

== Awards and recognition ==
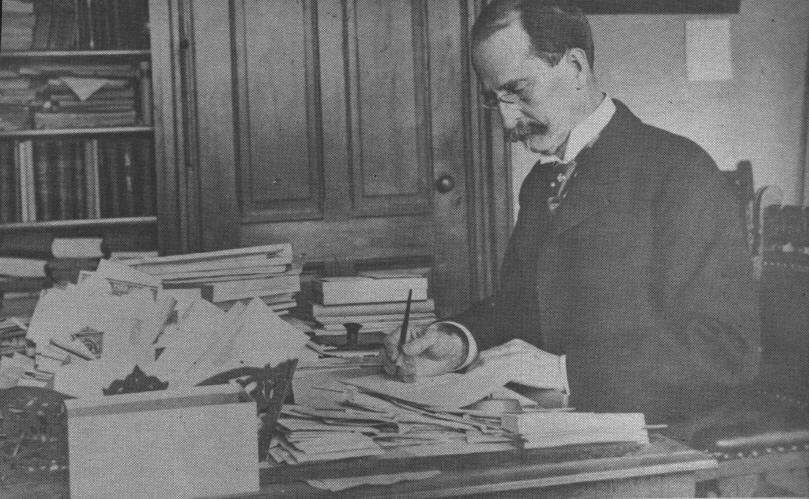
Edward Miner Gallaudet, 1900

Gallaudet was awarded honorary degrees by Trinity College in 1859 (M.A.) and 1869 (LL.D.), the Columbian University (later George Washington University) also in 1869 (Ph.D.), and Yale University in 1895 (LL.D.).

A statue commemorating Gallaudet's life and works resides on the campus of Gallaudet University, which was sculpted by Pietro Lazzari.

== See also ==
- Gallaudet University
- Bilingual-bicultural education
- Peter Wallace Gallaudet

Academic offices
Preceded by Position created	President of Gallaudet University; June 22, 1864–June 22, 1910	Succeeded by Percival Hall
