= American School for the Deaf =

Private school in Hartford, Connecticut, US

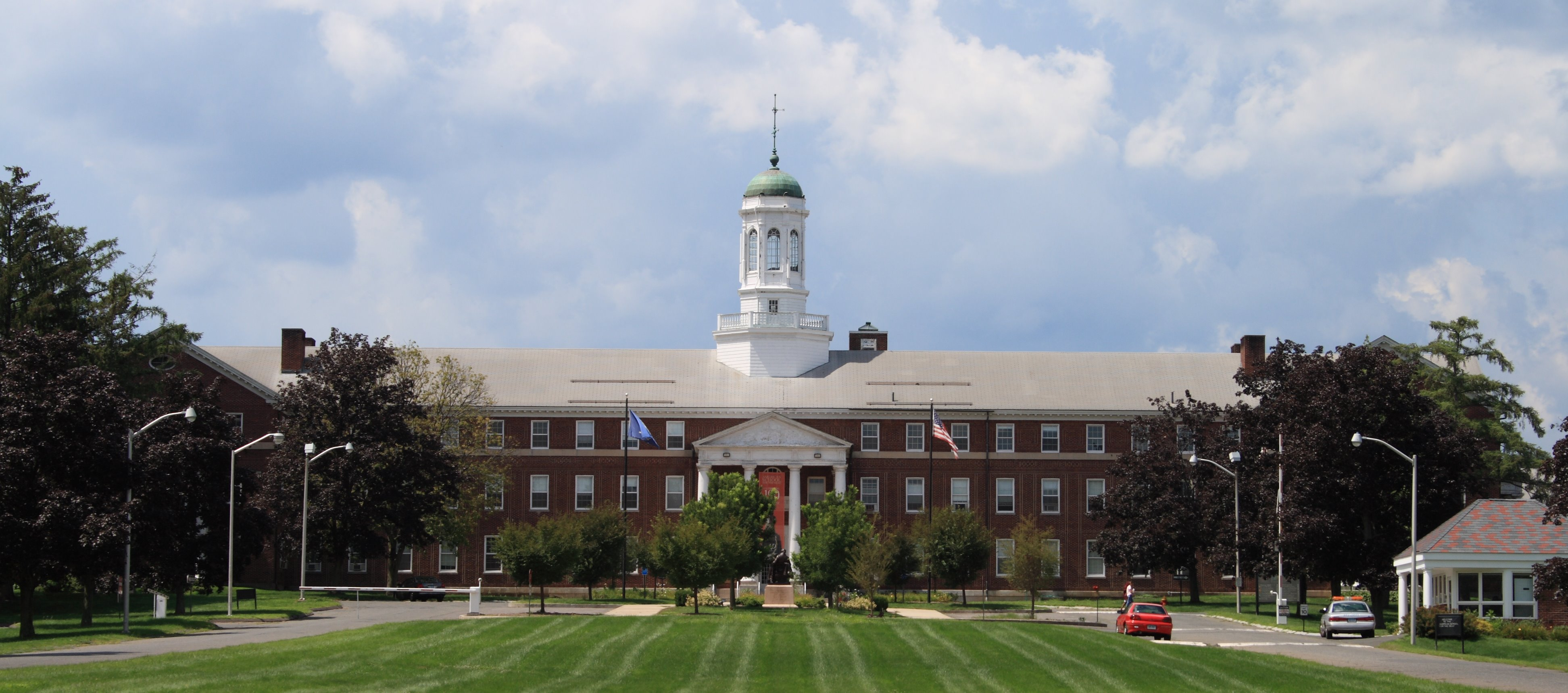

Location
- West Hartford, Connecticut; 41.7710°N 72.7473°W

Information
- Type: Private
- Established: April 15, 1817; 209 years ago
- Superintendent: Jeffrey S. Bravin
- Staff: 328
- Grades: K–12
- Enrollment: 174
- Colors: Black and orange
- Athletics: Soccer, Volleyball, Basketball, Track & Field, and Softball
- Mascot: Tigers
- Website: www.asd-1817.org

The American School for the Deaf (ASD), originally The Connecticut Asylum for the Education and Instruction of Deaf and Dumb Persons, is the oldest permanent K-12 school for the deaf in the United States, and the first school for deaf children anywhere in the western hemisphere. It was founded April 15, 1817, in Hartford, Connecticut, by Thomas Hopkins Gallaudet, Mason Cogswell, and Laurent Clerc and became a state-supported school later that year. Asylum Street, in Hartford, and Asylum Avenue, in Hartford and West Hartford, were named for the school.

== History ==
The first deaf school in the United States was short-lived: established in 1815 by Col. William Bolling of Goochland, Virginia, in nearby Cobbs, with John Braidwood (tutor of Bolling's two deaf children) as teacher, it closed in the fall of 1816.

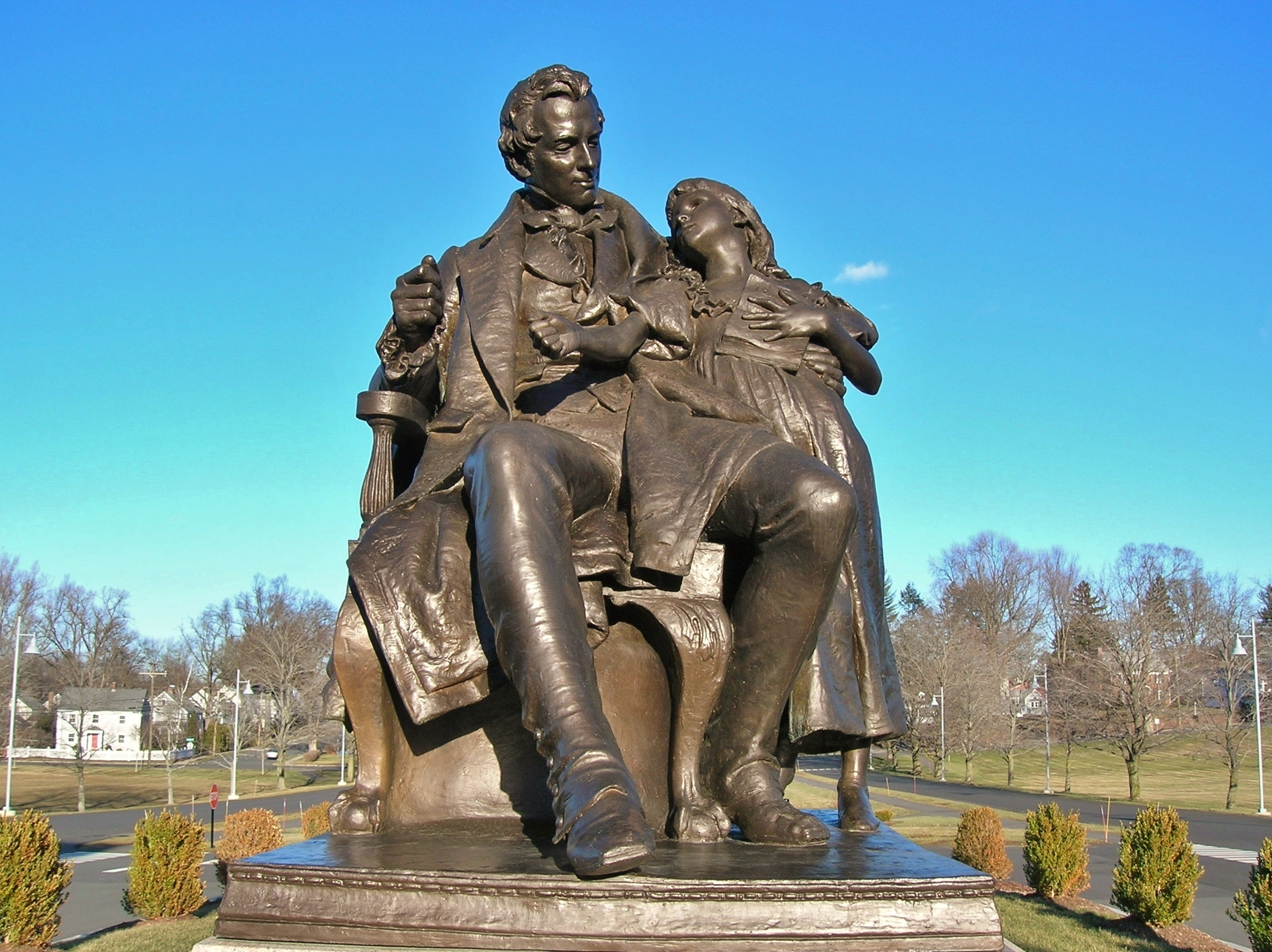
Gallaudet Memorial by Daniel Chester French (1925) at American School for the Deaf

The impetus behind its founding was that Alice Cogswell, the daughter of wealthy local surgeon Mason Fitch Cogswell, was deafened in childhood by fever at a time when the British schools were an unacceptable substitute for a local school. Cogswell prevailed upon the young Gallaudet (who had recently graduated from Yale University's School of Divinity and had begun studying at Andover). Gallaudet met young Alice in Hartford, where he was recovering from illness.

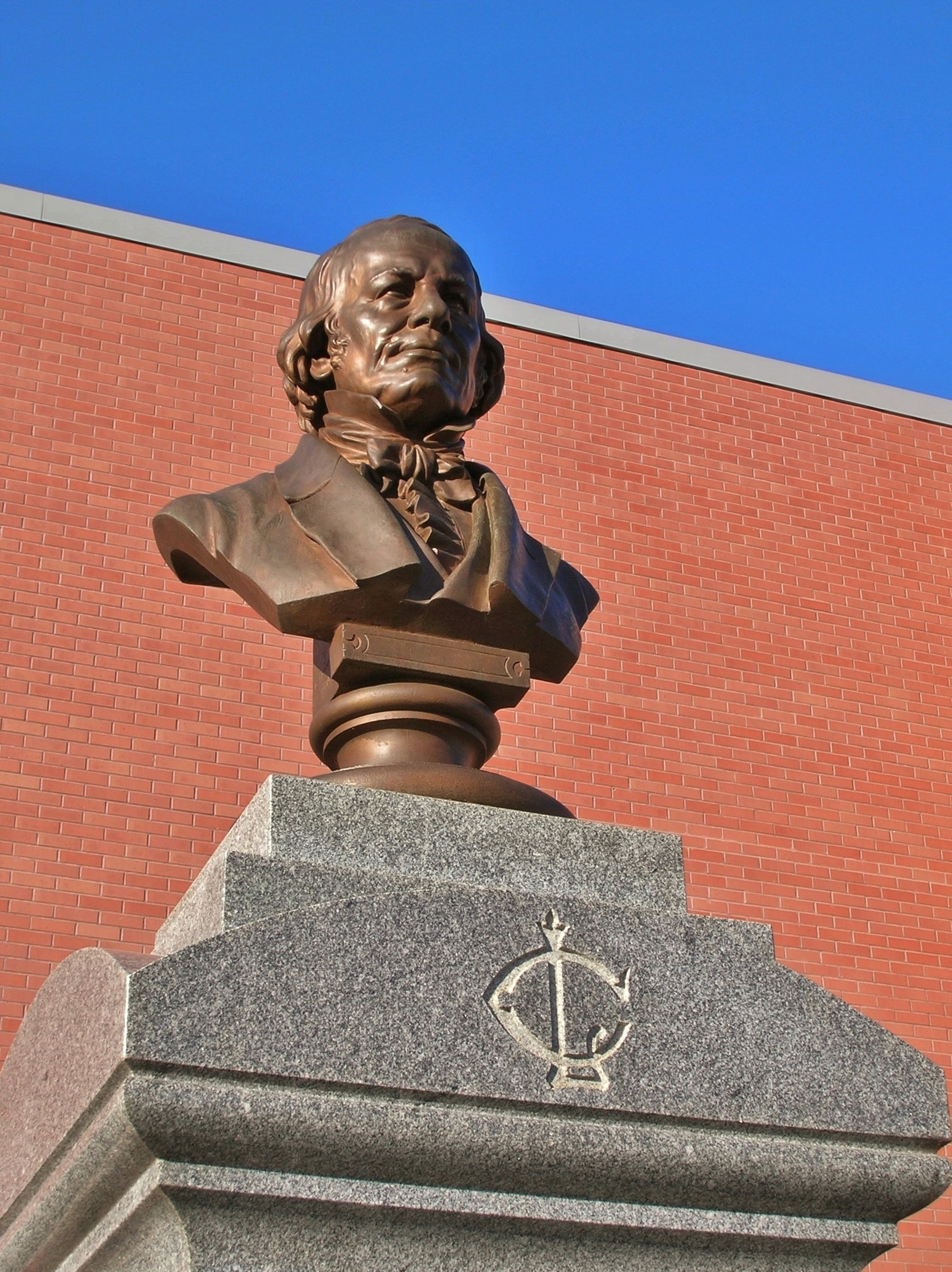
Laurent Clerc Bust by Carl Conrads

Cogswell and nine other citizens decided that the known 84 deaf children in New England needed appropriate facilities. However, competent teachers could not be found, so they sent Gallaudet in 1815 on a tour of Europe, where deaf education was a much more developed art. After being rebuffed by Robert Kinniburgh, the head of Braidwood's Academy for the Deaf and Dumb, who refused to share Thomas Braidwood's deaf pedagogy, Gallaudet turned to the Parisian French schoolteachers of the famous school for the Deaf in Paris, where he successfully recruited Laurent Clerc.

On the strength of Clerc's reputation, ASD was incorporated as the "Connecticut Asylum for the Education of Deaf and Dumb Persons," as it was originally known, in May 1816. When it opened in 1817, there were seven students enrolled: Alice Cogswell, George Loring, Wilson Whiton, Abigail Dillingham, Otis Waters, John Brewster Jr., and Nancy Orr. The original name of the school was The Connecticut Asylum (at Hartford) for the Education and Instruction of Deaf and Dumb Persons.

During the winter of 1818–1819, the American School for the Deaf became the first school of primary and secondary education to receive aid from the federal government when it was granted $300,000 (equivalent to $8.94 million in 2025). As a result of its pivotal role in American deaf history, it also hosts a museum containing numerous rare and old items. While it is situated on a 54-acre (22 ha) campus, the ASD has a small enrollment – as of 1981, the ASD had graduated approximately 6,000 graduates.

For 75 years to 1895, the institution was known as the American Asylum for the Deaf and Dumb.

The American School for the Deaf was also one of the first deaf schools in the country to admit African American students, beginning in 1825. Charles Hiller, a 15-year-old from Nantucket, enrolled in 1825 and graduated in 1829. At least a dozen more African American children attended ASD throughout the 19th century.

Gallaudet was principal until 1830. His son, Edward Miner Gallaudet followed in his legacy as the first president of the National Deaf-Mute College, which followed ASD's lead and taught students primarily in American Sign Language (derived from the methodical signs and Parisian sign language of the French Institute for the Deaf).

In 2019, April 15, the day on which the school was founded in 1817, was declared as the National American Sign Language Day.

In 2021, the ASD launched its "Online Academy" for students ages 12–16, which is the first virtual enrollment option offered by the school. The program is intended to provide services to students in other parts of the U.S. as well as international students. It also enrolls homeschooling students and hearing students who want to learn American Sign Language.

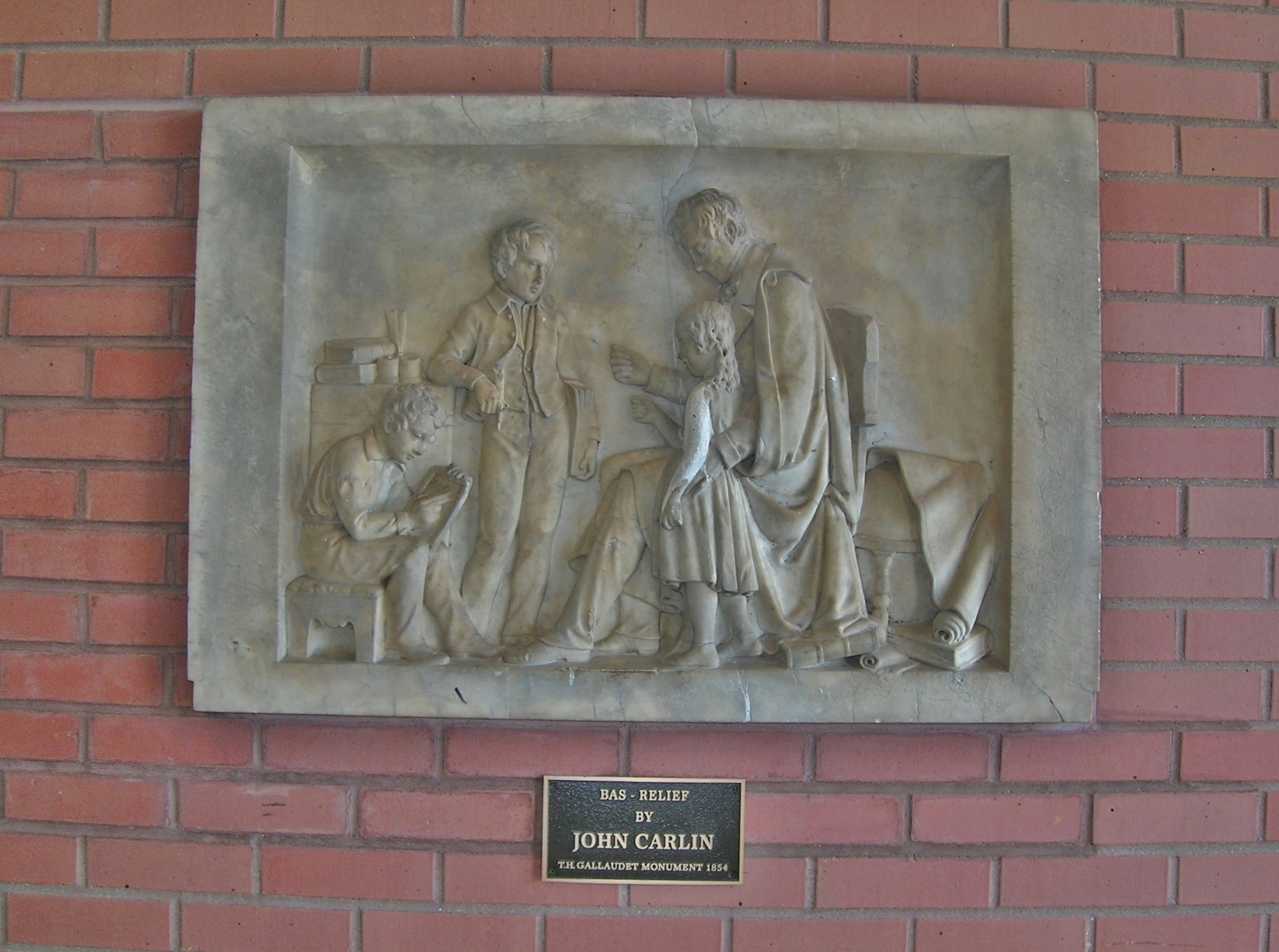
Panel from original Gallaudet monument (1854) depicting Thomas Hopkins Gallaudet teaching children the manual alphabet

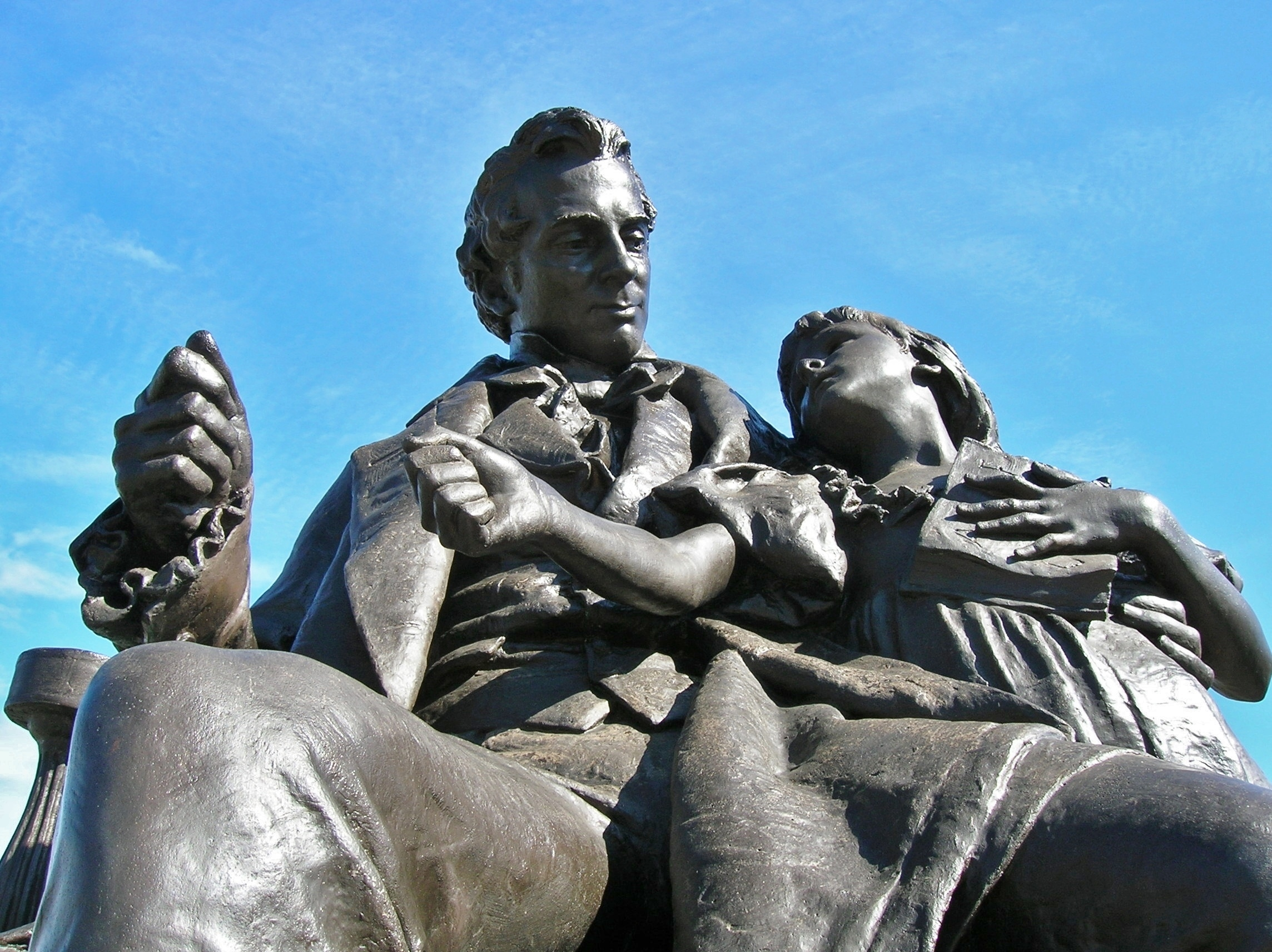
Thomas Hopkins Gallaudet and Alice Cogswell signing the letter A

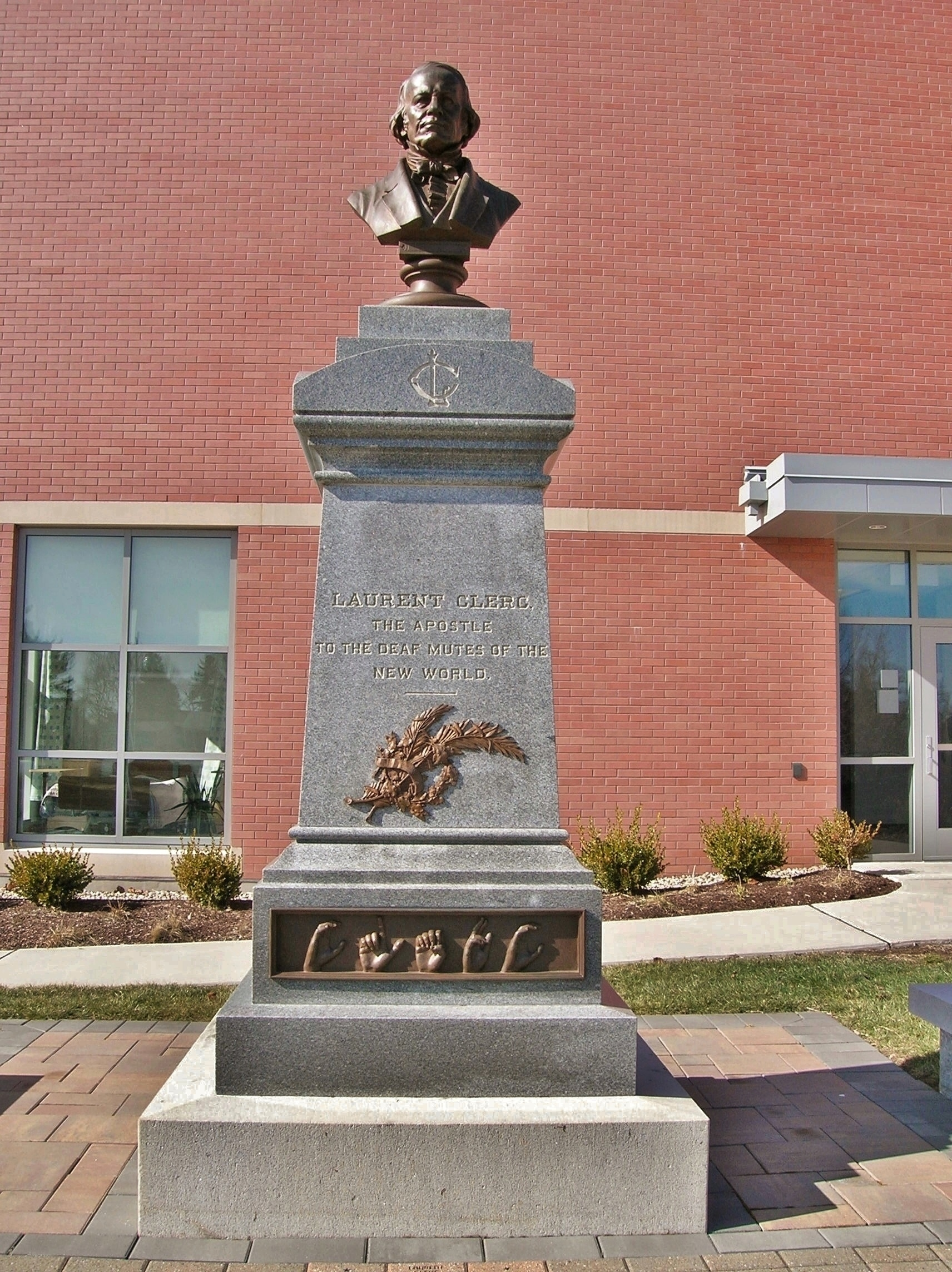
Laurent Clerc memorial; the name "Clerc" is spelled out in sign language at the base of the monument.

== National Theater of the Deaf ==
In 2004, National Theatre of the Deaf (NTD) moved its corporate headquarters to the campus of the American School for the Deaf.

== Notable alumni ==
- Edmund Booth helped establish the Iowa School for the Deaf.
- Julia Brace
- John Brewster Jr painter and at age 51 the oldest student of the school's first class.
- Alice Cogswell, inspiration for the school's founding
- John Flournoy helped establish the Georgia School for the Deaf.
- John B. Hotchkiss, first deaf professor at Gallaudet University
- Florence Lewis May (1916), art historian
