= List of American films of 2018 =

This is a list of American films released in 2018.

== Box office ==
The highest-grossing American films released in 2018, by domestic box office gross revenue, are as follows:

Highest-grossing films of 2018
Rank	Title	Distributor	Domestic gross
1	Black Panther	Disney	$700,059,566
2	Avengers: Infinity War	Disney	$678,815,482
3	Incredibles 2	Disney	$608,581,744
4	Jurassic World: Fallen Kingdom	Universal	$417,719,760
5	Aquaman	Warner Bros.	$335,104,314
6	Deadpool 2	20th Century Fox	$318,491,426
7	The Grinch	Universal	$270,620,950
8	Mission: Impossible – Fallout	Paramount	$220,159,104
9	Ant-Man and the Wasp	Disney	$216,648,740
10	Bohemian Rhapsody	20th Century Fox	$216,428,042

== January–March ==
Opening		Title	Production company	Cast and crew	Ref.
J A N U A R Y	5	Insidious: The Last Key	Universal Pictures / Blumhouse Productions / Stage 6 Films	Adam Robitel (director); Leigh Whannell (screenplay); Lin Shaye, Angus Sampson, Leigh Whannell, Spencer Locke, Caitlin Gerard, Bruce Davison	
J A N U A R Y	5	The Strange Ones	Vertical Entertainment	Christopher Radcliff (director/screenplay); Lauren Wolkstein (director); Alex Pettyfer, James Freedson-Jackson, Emily Althaus, Gene Jones, Owen Campbell, Tobias Campbell	
J A N U A R Y	12	The Commuter	Lionsgate / StudioCanal / The Picture Company	Jaume Collet-Serra (director); Byron Willinger, Philip de Blasi, Ryan Engle (screenplay); Liam Neeson, Vera Farmiga, Patrick Wilson, Jonathan Banks, Sam Neill	
J A N U A R Y	12	Proud Mary	Screen Gems	Babak Najafi (director); John S. Newman, Christian Swegal, Steve Antin (screenplay); Taraji P. Henson, Jahi Di'Allo Winston, Billy Brown, Danny Glover	
J A N U A R Y	12	Acts of Violence	Lionsgate Premiere	Brett Donowho (director); Nicolas Aaron Mezzanatto (screenplay); Bruce Willis, Cole Hauser, Shawn Ashmore, Ashton Holmes, Melissa Bolona, Sophia Bush, Mike Epps	
J A N U A R Y	12	Freak Show	IFC Films	Trudie Styler (director); Patrick J. Clifton, Beth Rigazio (screenplay); Alex Lawther, Abigail Breslin, AnnaSophia Robb, Ian Nelson, Celia Weston, Laverne Cox, Bette Midler	
J A N U A R Y	12	Humor Me	Shout! Factory / Shout! Studios	Sam Hoffman (director/screenplay); Jemaine Clement, Elliott Gould, Ingrid Michaelson, Annie Potts, Priscilla Lopez, Bebe Neuwirth, Maria Dizzia	
J A N U A R Y	19	12 Strong	Warner Bros. Pictures / Alcon Entertainment / Black Label Media / Jerry Bruckheimer Films	Nicolai Fuglsig (director); Ted Tally, Peter Craig (screenplay); Chris Hemsworth, Michael Shannon, Michael Peña, Navid Negahban, Trevante Rhodes, Geoff Stults, Thad Luckinbill	
J A N U A R Y	19	Den of Thieves	STX Entertainment	Christian Gudegast (director/screenplay); Gerard Butler, Pablo Schreiber, O'Shea Jackson Jr., 50 Cent	
J A N U A R Y	19	Forever My Girl	Roadside Attractions	Bethany Ashton Wolf (director/screenplay); Alex Roe, Jessica Rothe, John Benjamin Hickey, Abby Ryder Fortson, Travis Tritt	
J A N U A R Y	25	Thane of East County	Folk Process Films / Summer Hill Entertainment	Jesse Keller (director/screenplay); Carr Cavender, Molly Beucher, Connor Sullivan, Karl Backus, Joshua Alan Jones, Ron Christopher Jones, Brian Patrick Butler	
J A N U A R Y	26	Maze Runner: The Death Cure	20th Century Fox	Wes Ball (director); T. S. Nowlin (screenplay); Dylan O'Brien, Kaya Scodelario, Thomas Brodie-Sangster, Nathalie Emmanuel, Giancarlo Esposito, Aidan Gillen, Walton Goggins, Ki Hong Lee, Barry Pepper, Will Poulter, Patricia Clarkson	
J A N U A R Y	26	Please Stand By	Magnolia Pictures	Ben Lewin (director); Michael Golamco (screenplay); Dakota Fanning, Toni Collette, Alice Eve, River Alexander, Patton Oswalt	
F E B R U A R Y	2	Winchester	Lionsgate / CBS Films	The Spierig Brothers (director/screenplay); Tom Vaughan (screenplay); Helen Mirren, Jason Clarke, Sarah Snook	
F E B R U A R Y	2	A Fantastic Woman	Sony Pictures Classics	Sebastián Lelio (director/screenplay); Gonzalo Maza (screenplay); Daniela Vega, Francisco Reyes Morandé	
F E B R U A R Y	2	Armed	GVN Releasing	Mario Van Peebles (director/screenplay); Mario Van Peebles, Ryan Guzman, Columbus Short, Jemma Dallender, Brad Carter, Shakira Barrera, Laz Alonso, Dionne Warwick, Melvin Van Peebles, Roland Martin, Rocsi Diaz, Van Jones, Paul Rodriguez, William Fichtner	
F E B R U A R Y	4	The Cloverfield Paradox	Paramount Pictures / Netflix / Bad Robot	Julius Onah (director); Oren Uziel (screenplay); Gugu Mbatha-Raw, Elizabeth Debicki, Aksel Hennie, Daniel Brühl, Chris O'Dowd, John Ortiz, David Oyelowo, Zhang Ziyi	
F E B R U A R Y	6	Bad Apples	Uncork'd Entertainment	Bryan Coyne (director/screenplay); Brea Grant, Graham Skipper, Aly Fitzgerald, Heather Vaughn, Richard Riehle	
F E B R U A R Y	9	Peter Rabbit	Columbia Pictures / Sony Pictures Animation / Animal Logic	Will Gluck (director/screenplay); Rob Lieber (screenplay); Rose Byrne, Domhnall Gleeson, Sam Neill, Daisy Ridley, Elizabeth Debicki, Marianne Jean-Baptiste, Margot Robbie, James Corden	
F E B R U A R Y	9	Pad Man	Columbia Pictures / KriArj Entertainment	R. Balki (director/screenplay); Swanand Kirkire (screenplay); Akshay Kumar, Radhika Apte	
F E B R U A R Y	9	Fifty Shades Freed	Universal Pictures / Michael De Luca Productions	James Foley (director); Niall Leonard (screenplay); Dakota Johnson, Jamie Dornan, Eric Johnson, Rita Ora, Luke Grimes, Victor Rasuk, Jennifer Ehle, Marcia Gay Harden	
F E B R U A R Y	9	The 15:17 to Paris	Warner Bros. Pictures / Village Roadshow Pictures	Clint Eastwood (director); Dorothy Blyskal (screenplay); Anthony Sadler, Alek Skarlatos, Spencer Stone	
F E B R U A R Y	9	Permission	Good Deed Entertainment	Brian Crano (director/screenplay); Rebecca Hall, Dan Stevens, Gina Gershon, François Arnaud, Morgan Spector, David Joseph Craig, Jason Sudeikis	
F E B R U A R Y	9	Golden Exits	Vertical Entertainment / Stage 6 Films	Alex Ross Perry (director/screenplay); Emily Browning, Adam Horowitz, Mary-Louise Parker, Jason Schwartzman, Chloë Sevigny, Analeigh Tipton	
F E B R U A R Y	16	Black Panther	Marvel Studios	Ryan Coogler (director/screenplay); Joe Robert Cole (screenplay); Chadwick Boseman, Michael B. Jordan, Lupita Nyong'o, Danai Gurira, Martin Freeman, Daniel Kaluuya, Letitia Wright, Winston Duke, Sterling K. Brown, Angela Bassett, Forest Whitaker, Andy Serkis	
F E B R U A R Y	16	Looking Glass	Highland Film Group	Tim Hunter (director); Nicolas Cage, Robin Tunney	
F E B R U A R Y	16	Nostalgia	Bleecker Street	Mark Pellington (director/screenplay); Alex Ross Perry (screenplay); Jon Hamm, Catherine Keener, John Ortiz, Nick Offerman, James LeGros, Bruce Dern, Ellen Burstyn	
F E B R U A R Y	16	Samson	Pure Flix	Bruce Macdonald (director); Jason Baumgardner, Zach Smith, Timothy Ratajczak, Galen Gilbert (screenplay); Taylor James, Jackson Rathbone, Billy Zane, Caitlin Leahy, Rutger Hauer, Lindsay Wagner	
F E B R U A R Y	23	Game Night	Warner Bros. Pictures / New Line Cinema / RatPac Entertainment	John Francis Daley, Jonathan Goldstein (directors); Mark Perez (screenplay); Jason Bateman, Rachel McAdams, Billy Magnussen, Sharon Horgan, Lamorne Morris, Kylie Bunbury, Jesse Plemons, Michael C. Hall, Kyle Chandler	
F E B R U A R Y	23	Annihilation	Paramount Pictures / Skydance Media / DNA Films	Alex Garland (director/screenplay); Natalie Portman, Jennifer Jason Leigh, Gina Rodriguez, Tessa Thompson, Tuva Novotny, Oscar Isaac	
F E B R U A R Y	23	Every Day	Orion Pictures	Michael Sucsy (director); Jesse Andrews (screenplay); Angourie Rice, Justice Smith, Debby Ryan, Maria Bello	
F E B R U A R Y	23	The Cured	IFC Films	David Freyne (director/screenplay); Elliot Page, Sam Keeley, Tom Vaughan-Lawlor	
M A R C H	2	Red Sparrow	20th Century Fox / Chernin Entertainment	Francis Lawrence (director); Justin Haythe (screenplay); Jennifer Lawrence, Joel Edgerton, Matthias Schoenaerts, Jeremy Irons	
M A R C H	2	Death Wish	Metro-Goldwyn-Mayer	Eli Roth (director); Joe Carnahan (screenplay); Bruce Willis, Vincent D'Onofrio, Elisabeth Shue, Dean Norris, Kimberly Elise	
M A R C H	2	The Vanishing of Sidney Hall	A24	Shawn Christensen (director/screenplay); Jason Dolan (screenplay); Logan Lerman, Elle Fanning, Michelle Monaghan, Nathan Lane, Kyle Chandler	
M A R C H	2	Pickings	Digital Magic Entertainment	Usher Morgan (director/screenplay); Elyse Price, Katie Vincent, Joel Bernard, Joe Trombino, Emil Ferzola, Yaron Urbas	
M A R C H	9	A Wrinkle in Time	Walt Disney Pictures	Ava DuVernay (director); Jennifer Lee, Jeff Stockwell (screenplay); Storm Reid, Oprah Winfrey, Reese Witherspoon, Mindy Kaling, Gugu Mbatha-Raw, Michael Peña, Zach Galifianakis, Chris Pine	
M A R C H	9	Gringo	Amazon Studios / STX Entertainment	Nash Edgerton (director); Matthew Stone, Anthony Tambakis (screenplay); David Oyelowo, Charlize Theron, Joel Edgerton, Amanda Seyfried, Thandiwe Newton, Sharlto Copley	
M A R C H	9	Thoroughbreds	Focus Features	Cory Finley (director/screenplay); Olivia Cooke, Anya Taylor-Joy, Anton Yelchin, Paul Sparks, Francie Swift	
M A R C H	9	The Strangers: Prey at Night	Aviron Pictures / Rogue	Johannes Roberts (director); Bryan Bertino, Ben Ketai (screenplay); Christina Hendricks, Martin Henderson, Bailee Madison, Lewis Pullman	
M A R C H	9	The Hurricane Heist	Entertainment Studios	Rob Cohen (director); Scott Windhauser, Jeff Dixon (screenplay); Toby Kebbell, Maggie Grace, Ryan Kwanten, Ralph Ineson, Melissa Bolona, James Cutler, Ben Cross	
M A R C H	16	Tomb Raider	Warner Bros. Pictures / GK Films / Metro-Goldwyn-Mayer / Square-Enix	Roar Uthaug (director); Geneva Robertson-Dworet, Alastair Siddons (screenplay); Alicia Vikander, Dominic West, Walton Goggins, Daniel Wu, Kristin Scott Thomas	
M A R C H	16	Love, Simon	20th Century Fox	Greg Berlanti (director); Isaac Aptaker, Elizabeth Berger (screenplay); Nick Robinson, Josh Duhamel, Jennifer Garner	
M A R C H	16	I Can Only Imagine	Roadside Attractions / Lionsgate	Erwin brothers (directors); Jon Erwin, Brent McCorkle (screenplay); J. Michael Finley, Madeline Carroll, Trace Adkins, Priscilla Shirer, Cloris Leachman, Dennis Quaid	
M A R C H	16	Entebbe	Focus Features / StudioCanal / Participant Media / Working Title Films	José Padilha (director); Gregory Burke (screenplay); Rosamund Pike, Daniel Brühl, Eddie Marsan, Ben Schnetzer, Lior Ashkenazi, Denis Ménochet	
M A R C H	16	Furlough	IFC Films	Laurie Collyer (director); Barry Strugatz (screenplay); Tessa Thompson, Melissa Leo, Whoopi Goldberg, Anna Paquin	
M A R C H	16	Josie	Screen Media Films	Eric England (director), Anthony Ragnone II (screenplay); Sophie Turner, Dylan McDermott, Jack Kilmer, Micah Fitzgerald, Lombardo Boyar, Daeg Faerch, Robin Bartlett, Kurt Fuller	
M A R C H	16	Flower	The Orchard	Max Winkler (director/screenplay); Alex McAulay, Matt Spicer (screenplay); Zoey Deutch, Kathryn Hahn, Tim Heidecker, Adam Scott, Joey Morgan, Dylan Gelula	
M A R C H	23	Pacific Rim Uprising	Universal Pictures / Legendary Pictures	Steven S. DeKnight (director/screenplay); Emily Carmichael, Kira Snyder, T. S. Nowlin (screenplay); John Boyega, Scott Eastwood, Jing Tian, Cailee Spaeny, Rinko Kikuchi, Burn Gorman, Adria Arjona, Zhang Jin, Charlie Day	
M A R C H	23	Isle of Dogs	Fox Searchlight Pictures / Indian Paintbrush	Wes Anderson (director/screenplay); Bryan Cranston, Koyu Rankin, Edward Norton, Liev Schreiber, Bill Murray, Bob Balaban, Jeff Goldblum, Scarlett Johansson, Kunichi Nomura, Tilda Swinton, Ken Watanabe, Akira Ito, Greta Gerwig, Akira Takayama, Frances McDormand, F. Murray Abraham, Yojiro Noda, Fisher Stevens, Mari Natsuki, Nijirō Murakami, Yoko Ono, Harvey Keitel, Frank Wood	
M A R C H	23	Sherlock Gnomes	Paramount Pictures / Paramount Animation / Metro-Goldwyn-Mayer / Rocket Pictures	John Stevenson (director); Ben Zazove (screenplay); James McAvoy, Emily Blunt, Chiwetel Ejiofor, Michael Caine, Ashley Jensen, Maggie Smith, Matt Lucas, Stephen Merchant, Ozzy Osbourne, Mary J. Blige, Julie Walters, Richard Wilson, Jamie Demetriou, Johnny Depp, Dexter Fletcher, James Hong, Eve Webster, Julio Bonet	
M A R C H	23	Unsane	Bleecker Street / Regency Enterprises	Steven Soderbergh (director); Jonathan Bernstein, James Greer (screenplay); Claire Foy, Joshua Leonard, Jay Pharoah, Juno Temple, Aimee Mullins, Amy Irving, Matt Damon	
M A R C H	23	Paul, Apostle of Christ	Affirm Films	Andrew Hyatt (director/screenplay); Jim Caviezel, Olivier Martinez, James Faulkner, Joanne Whalley, John Lynch	
M A R C H	23	Final Portrait	Sony Pictures Classics	Stanley Tucci (director/screenplay); Geoffrey Rush, Armie Hammer, Clémence Poésy, Tony Shalhoub, James Faulkner, Sylvie Testud	
M A R C H	23	Midnight Sun	Global Road Entertainment	Scott Speer (director); Eric Kirsten (screenplay); Bella Thorne, Patrick Schwarzenegger, Rob Riggle, Quinn Shephard, Suleka Mathew	
M A R C H	29	Ready Player One	Warner Bros. Pictures / Village Roadshow Pictures / RatPac Entertainment / Amblin Entertainment	Steven Spielberg (director); Zak Penn, Ernest Cline (screenplay); Tye Sheridan, Olivia Cooke, Ben Mendelsohn, T.J. Miller, Simon Pegg, Mark Rylance	
M A R C H	30	Acrimony	Lionsgate / Tyler Perry Films	Tyler Perry (director/screenplay); Taraji P. Henson, Lyriq Bent, Crystle Stewart, Ptosha Storey, Jazmyn Simon, Ajiona Alexus, Antonio Madison, Bresha Webb, Danielle Nicolet, Nelson Estevez, Kendrick Cross	
M A R C H	30	God's Not Dead: A Light in Darkness	Pure Flix	Michael Mason (director/screenplay); David A. R. White, John Corbett, Shane Harper, Ted McGinley, Tatum O'Neal	
M A R C H	30	Gemini	Neon	Aaron Katz (director/screenplay); Lola Kirke, Zoë Kravitz, Greta Lee, Nelson Franklin, Reeve Carney, Jessica Parker Kennedy, Ricki Lake, John Cho	
M A R C H	30	The Last Movie Star	A24	Adam Rifkin (director/screenplay); Burt Reynolds, Ariel Winter, Clark Duke, Ellar Coltrane, Chevy Chase	

== April–June ==
Opening		Title	Production company	Cast and crew	Ref.
A P R I L	6	A Quiet Place	Paramount Pictures / Platinum Dunes / Sunday Night Productions	John Krasinski (director/screenplay); Bryan Woods, Scott Beck (screenplay); Emily Blunt, John Krasinski, Millicent Simmonds, Noah Jupe	
A P R I L	6	Blockers	Universal Pictures / Good Universe / Point Grey Pictures	Kay Cannon (director); Brian Kehoe, Jim Kehoe (screenplay); Leslie Mann, Ike Barinholtz, John Cena	
A P R I L	6	You Were Never Really Here	Amazon Studios	Lynne Ramsay (director/screenplay); Joaquin Phoenix, Judith Roberts, Ekaterina Samsonov, John Doman, Alex Manette, Dante Pereira-Olson, Alessandro Nivola	
A P R I L	6	Chappaquiddick	Entertainment Studios	John Curran (director); Taylor Allen, Andrew Logan (screenplay); Jason Clarke, Kate Mara, Ed Helms, Jim Gaffigan, Clancy Brown, Olivia Thirlby, Bruce Dern	
A P R I L	6	The Miracle Season	LD Entertainment	Sean McNamara (director); David Aaron Cohen, Elissa Matsueda (screenplay); Erin Moriarty, Helen Hunt, William Hurt, Danika Yarosh	
A P R I L	8	Paterno	HBO Films / Levinson/Fontana / Sony Pictures Television / Edward R. Pressman Films	Barry Levinson (director); Debora Cahn, John C. Richards (screenplay); Al Pacino, Riley Keough, Kathy Baker, Greg Grunberg, Annie Parisse, Ben Cook, Peter Jacobson, Michael Mastro, Murphy Guyer, Nicholas Sadler, Julian Gamble, Georgia Buchanan, Thomas Bradshaw, Corwin Tuggles, Celia Au, Jamie Eddy, John D'Leo, Midori Francis, Tess Frazer, Colby Minifie, James Saito, Jim Johnson, Larry Mitchell, Darren Goldstein, Kristen Bush, Sean Cullen, Steve Coulter, Tom Kemp, William Hill, Josh Mowrey, Camrus Johnson	
A P R I L	11	Beirut	Bleecker Street	Brad Anderson (director); Tony Gilroy (screenplay); Jon Hamm, Rosamund Pike, Dean Norris, Larry Pine, Shea Whigham	
A P R I L	13	Rampage	Warner Bros. Pictures / New Line Cinema / Seven Bucks Productions	Brad Peyton (director); Ryan Engle, Carlton Cuse, Ryan Condal, Adam Sztykiel (screenplay); Dwayne Johnson, Naomie Harris, Malin Åkerman, Jake Lacy, Jeffrey Dean Morgan	
A P R I L	13	Truth or Dare	Universal Pictures / Blumhouse Productions	Jeff Wadlow (director/screenplay); Michael Reisz, Jillian Jacobs, Chris Roach (screenplay); Lucy Hale, Tyler Posey, Violett Beane, Hayden Szeto, Landon Liboiron	
A P R I L	13	The Rider	Sony Pictures Classics	Chloé Zhao (director/screenplay); Brady Jandreau, Lilly Jandreau, Tim Jandreau, Lane Scott, Cat Clifford	
A P R I L	13	Sgt. Stubby: An American Hero	Fun Academy Motion Pictures / Mikros Image	Richard Lanni (director/screenplay); Mike Stokey (screenplay); Logan Lerman, Helena Bonham Carter, Gérard Depardieu	
A P R I L	13	Sign Gene	Pluin Productions	Emilio Insolera (director/screenplay); Emilio Insolera, Carola Insolera, Ben Bahan, Hiroshi Vava, Humberto Insolera, Noboru Kuragawa	
A P R I L	20	I Feel Pretty	STX Entertainment	Abby Kohn, Marc Silverstein (director/screenplay); Amy Schumer, Michelle Williams, Rory Scovel, Emily Ratajkowski, Aidy Bryant, Tom Hopper, Naomi Campbell, Lauren Hutton	
A P R I L	20	Super Troopers 2	Fox Searchlight Pictures	Jay Chandrasekhar (director); Broken Lizard (screenplay); Jay Chandrasekhar, Kevin Heffernan, Steve Lemme, Paul Soter, Erik Stolhanske, Rob Lowe, Brian Cox	
A P R I L	20	Traffik	Summit Entertainment / Codeblack Films	Deon Taylor (director/screenplay); Paula Patton, Omar Epps, Laz Alonso, Roselyn Sánchez, Dawn Olivieri, Luke Goss, Missi Pyle, William Fichtner	
A P R I L	20	The House of Tomorrow	Shout! Studios	Peter Livolsi (director/screenplay); Ellen Burstyn, Nick Offerman, Asa Butterfield, Alex Wolff, Maude Apatow, Michaela Watkins	
A P R I L	27	Avengers: Infinity War	Marvel Studios	Russo brothers (directors); Christopher Markus, Stephen McFeely (screenplay); Robert Downey Jr., Chris Hemsworth, Mark Ruffalo, Chris Evans, Scarlett Johansson, Benedict Cumberbatch, Don Cheadle, Tom Holland, Chadwick Boseman, Paul Bettany, Elizabeth Olsen, Anthony Mackie, Sebastian Stan, Danai Gurira, Letitia Wright, Dave Bautista, Zoe Saldaña, Josh Brolin, Chris Pratt	
A P R I L	27	Disobedience	Bleecker Street	Sebastián Lelio (director/screenplay); Rebecca Lenkiewicz (screenplay); Rachel Weisz, Rachel McAdams, Alessandro Nivola	
A P R I L	27	Backstabbing for Beginners	A24	Per Fly (director/screenplay); Daniel Pyne (screenplay); Theo James, Ben Kingsley, Belçim Bilgin, Jacqueline Bisset	
A P R I L	27	Kings	The Orchard	Deniz Gamze Ergüven (director/screenplay); Halle Berry, Daniel Craig	
M A Y	4	Overboard	Metro-Goldwyn-Mayer / Lionsgate / Pantelion Films	Rob Greenberg (director); Bob Fisher, Leslie Dixon (screenplay); Eugenio Derbez, Anna Faris, Eva Longoria, Mel Rodriguez, Cecilia Suárez, Mariana Treviño, Fernando Luján, John Hannah	
M A Y	4	Tully	Focus Features / Bron Studios	Jason Reitman (director); Diablo Cody (screenplay); Charlize Theron, Mackenzie Davis, Ron Livingston, Mark Duplass	
M A Y	4	Bad Samaritan	Electric Entertainment	Dean Devlin (director); Brandon Boyce (screenplay); David Tennant, Robert Sheehan, Carlito Olivero, Kerry Condon, Jacqueline Byers	
M A Y	4	The Cleanse	Vertical Entertainment	Bobby Miller (director/screenplay); Johnny Galecki, Anna Friel, Oliver Platt, Anjelica Huston, Kyle Gallner, Kevin J. O'Connor, Diana Bang	
M A Y	4	RBG	Participant Media / CNN Films / Magnolia Pictures	Betsy West (director); Julie Cohen (director); Ruth Bader Ginsburg; Jane Ginsburg; James Steven Ginsburg; Nina Totenberg; Gloria Steinem	
M A Y	11	Life of the Party	Warner Bros. Pictures / New Line Cinema	Ben Falcone (director/screenplay); Melissa McCarthy (screenplay); Melissa McCarthy, Gillian Jacobs, Maya Rudolph, Julie Bowen, Matt Walsh, Molly Gordon, Stephen Root, Jacki Weaver	
M A Y	11	Breaking In	Universal Pictures	James McTeigue (director); Ryan Engle (screenplay); Gabrielle Union, Billy Burke, Richard Cabral, Ajiona Alexus, Levi Meaden, Jason Winston George, Seth Carr, Christa Miller	
M A Y	11	The Seagull	Sony Pictures Classics	Michael Mayer (director); Stephen Karam (screenplay); Annette Bening, Saoirse Ronan, Corey Stoll, Elisabeth Moss, Mare Winningham, Jon Tenney, Glenn Fleshler, Michael Zegen, Billy Howle, Brian Dennehy	
M A Y	11	Terminal	RLJE Films	Vaughn Stein (director/screenplay); Margot Robbie, Simon Pegg, Dexter Fletcher, Max Irons, Mike Myers	
M A Y	18	Deadpool 2	20th Century Fox / Marvel Entertainment	David Leitch (director); Rhett Reese, Paul Wernick, Ryan Reynolds (screenplay); Ryan Reynolds, Josh Brolin, Morena Baccarin, Julian Dennison, Zazie Beetz, T.J. Miller, Brianna Hildebrand, Jack Kesy	
M A Y	18	Show Dogs	Global Road Entertainment	Raja Gosnell (director); Max Botkin, Marc Hyman (screenplay); Will Arnett, Ludacris, Natasha Lyonne, Jordin Sparks, Gabriel Iglesias, Shaquille O'Neal, Omar Chaparro, Stanley Tucci	
M A Y	18	Book Club	Paramount Pictures	Bill Holderman (director/screenplay); Erin Simms (screenplay); Diane Keaton, Jane Fonda, Candice Bergen, Mary Steenburgen	
M A Y	18	First Reformed	A24	Paul Schrader (director/screenplay); Ethan Hawke, Amanda Seyfried, Cedric the Entertainer	
M A Y	19	Fahrenheit 451	HBO Films / Outlier Society	Ramin Bahrani (director/screenplay); Amir Naderi (screenplay); Michael B. Jordan, Michael Shannon, Sofia Boutella, Khandi Alexander, Lilly Singh, Raoul Bhaneja, Martin Donovan, Andy McQueen, Dylan Taylor, Grace Lynn Kung, Ted Whittall, Ted Dykstra, Keir Dullea, Daniel Zolghadri, Drew Nelson, Lynne Griffin, Joe Pingue, Mayko Nguyen, Saad Siddiqui, Jane Moffat, Aaron Davis, Cindy Katz	
M A Y	25	Solo: A Star Wars Story	Lucasfilm	Ron Howard (director); Jonathan Kasdan, Lawrence Kasdan (screenplay); Alden Ehrenreich, Woody Harrelson, Emilia Clarke, Donald Glover, Thandiwe Newton, Phoebe Waller-Bridge, Joonas Suotamo, Paul Bettany	
M A Y	25	How to Talk to Girls at Parties	A24	John Cameron Mitchell (director/screenplay); Philippa Goslett (screenplay); Elle Fanning, Alex Sharp, Nicole Kidman, Ruth Wilson, Matt Lucas	
M A Y	25	In Darkness	Vertical Entertainment	Anthony Byrne (director/screenplay); Natalie Dormer (screenplay); Natalie Dormer, Ed Skrein, Emily Ratajkowski, Joely Richardson, Olegar Fedoro	
M A Y	25	Future World	Lionsgate Premiere	James Franco (director); Bruce Thierry Cheung (director/screenplay); Jay Davis (screenplay); James Franco, Suki Waterhouse, Jeffrey Wahlberg, Margarita Levieva, Snoop Dogg, Twin Shadow, Method Man, Lucy Liu, Milla Jovovich	
M A Y	26	The Tale	HBO Films / Gamechanger Films / Fork Films / One Two Films / WeatherVane Productions / Blackbird Films	Jennifer Fox (director/screenplay); Laura Dern, Ellen Burstyn, Jason Ritter, Elizabeth Debicki, Isabelle Nélisse, Common, Frances Conroy, John Heard, Jodi Long, Tina Parker, Laura Allen, Isabella Amara, Juli Erickson, Chelsea Alden, Scott Takeda, Noah Lomax, Grant James, Jaqueline Fleming, Matthew Rauch, Aaron Williamson, Daniel Berson, Jessica Sarah Flaum, Shay Lee Abeson, Gretchen Koerner	
J U N E	1	Action Point	Paramount Pictures	Tim Kirkby (director); John Altschuler, Dave Krinsky (screenplay); Johnny Knoxville, Chris Pontius	
J U N E	1	Adrift	STX Entertainment	Baltasar Kormákur (director); Aaron Kandell, Jordan Kandell, David Branson Smith (screenplay); Shailene Woodley, Sam Claflin	
J U N E	1	Upgrade	BH Tilt	Leigh Whannell (director/screenplay); Logan Marshall-Green, Betty Gabriel, Harrison Gilbertson	
J U N E	1	American Animals	The Orchard / MoviePass Ventures	Bart Layton (director/screenplay); Evan Peters, Barry Keoghan, Blake Jenner, Jared Abrahamson, Udo Kier, Ann Dowd	
J U N E	1	Social Animals	Vertical Entertainment	Theresa Bennett (director/screenplay); Noël Wells, Josh Radnor, Aya Cash, Carly Chaikin, Fortune Feimster, Samira Wiley	
J U N E	8	Ocean's 8	Warner Bros. Pictures / Village Roadshow Pictures	Gary Ross (director/screenplay); Olivia Milch (screenplay); Sandra Bullock, Cate Blanchett, Anne Hathaway, Mindy Kaling, Sarah Paulson, Awkwafina, Rihanna, Helena Bonham Carter	
J U N E	8	Hereditary	A24	Ari Aster (director/screenplay); Toni Collette, Alex Wolff, Milly Shapiro, Ann Dowd, Gabriel Byrne	
J U N E	8	Hotel Artemis	Global Road Entertainment	Drew Pearce (director/screenplay); Jodie Foster, Sterling K. Brown, Sofia Boutella, Jeff Goldblum, Brian Tyree Henry, Jenny Slate, Zachary Quinto, Charlie Day, Dave Bautista	
J U N E	13	Superfly	Columbia Pictures / Silver Pictures	Director X (director); Alex Tse (screenplay); Trevor Jackson, Jason Mitchell, Michael K. Williams, Lex Scott Davis, Jennifer Morrison	
J U N E	15	Incredibles 2	Walt Disney Pictures / Pixar Animation Studios	Brad Bird (director/screenplay); Craig T. Nelson, Holly Hunter, Sarah Vowell, Huckleberry Milner, Samuel L. Jackson, Bob Odenkirk, Catherine Keener, Jonathan Banks, Brad Bird, Sophia Bush, Phil LaMarr, Paul Eiding, Isabella Rossellini, John Ratzenberger, Barry Bostwick, Jere Burns, Adam Rodriguez, Usher, Eli Fucile	
J U N E	15	Tag	Warner Bros. Pictures / New Line Cinema	Jeff Tomsic (director); Rob McKittrick, Mark Steilen (screenplay); Ed Helms, Jake Johnson, Annabelle Wallis, Hannibal Buress, Isla Fisher, Rashida Jones, Leslie Bibb, Jon Hamm, Jeremy Renner	
J U N E	15	Gotti	Vertical Entertainment	Kevin Connolly (director); Lem Dobbs, Leo Rossi (screenplay); John Travolta, Spencer Lofranco, Pruitt Taylor Vince, Stacy Keach, Chris Mulkey, William DeMeo, Kelly Preston	
J U N E	22	Jurassic World: Fallen Kingdom	Universal Pictures / Amblin Entertainment / Legendary Pictures / Perfect World Pictures	J. A. Bayona (director); Derek Connolly, Colin Trevorrow (screenplay); Chris Pratt, Bryce Dallas Howard, Rafe Spall, Toby Jones, Ted Levine, BD Wong, Jeff Goldblum	
J U N E	22	Boundaries	Sony Pictures Classics	Shana Feste (director/screenplay); Vera Farmiga, Christopher Plummer, Lewis MacDougall, Bobby Cannavale, Kristen Schaal, Christopher Lloyd, Peter Fonda	
J U N E	22	Damsel	Magnolia Pictures	David Zellner, Nathan Zellner (directors/screenplay); Robert Pattinson, Mia Wasikowska	
J U N E	28	The Domestics	Orion Classics	Mike P. Nelson (director/screenplay); Tyler Hoechlin, Kate Bosworth, Lance Reddick, Sonoya Mizuno, Dana Gourrier, Thomas Francis Murray, David Dastmalchian	
J U N E	29	Sicario: Day of the Soldado	Columbia Pictures / Black Label Media / Thunder Road Pictures	Stefano Sollima (director); Taylor Sheridan (screenplay); Benicio del Toro, Josh Brolin, Isabela Merced, Jeffrey Donovan, Manuel Garcia-Rulfo, Catherine Keener	
J U N E	29	Leave No Trace	Bleecker Street	Debra Granik (director/screenplay); Anne Rosellini (screenplay); Ben Foster, Thomasin McKenzie, Jeff Kober, Dale Dickey	
J U N E	29	Love All You Have Left	Dongo Productions / Indie Rights	Matt Sivertson (director/screenplay); Caroline Amiguet, Sara Wolfkind, Michael Christopher Shantz, Mike Burnell, Kathleen Sheehy	
J U N E	29	Uncle Drew	Summit Entertainment	Charles Stone III (director); Jay Longino (screenplay); Kyrie Irving, Lil Rel Howery, Shaquille O'Neal, Chris Webber, Reggie Miller, Nate Robinson, Lisa Leslie, Erica Ash, J. B. Smoove, Mike Epps, Tiffany Haddish, Nick Kroll, Aaron Gordon	
J U N E	29	Woman Walks Ahead	A24	Susanna White (director); Steven Knight (screenplay); Jessica Chastain, Michael Greyeyes, Chaske Spencer, Sam Rockwell	

== July–September ==
Opening		Title	Production company	Cast and crew	Ref.
J U L Y	3	Who's Watching Oliver	Motionpictures / Gravitas Ventures	Richie Moore (director/screenplay); Raimund Huber, Russell Geoffrey Banks (screenplay); Russell Geoffrey Banks, Sara Malakul Lane, Margaret Roche	
J U L Y	4	The First Purge	Universal Pictures / Blumhouse Productions / Platinum Dunes	Gerard McMurray (director); James DeMonaco (screenplay); Y'lan Noel, Lex Scott Davis, Joivan Wade, Steve Harris	
J U L Y	6	Ant-Man and the Wasp	Marvel Studios	Peyton Reed (director); Chris McKenna, Erik Sommers, Paul Rudd, Andrew Barrer, Gabriel Ferrari (screenplay); Paul Rudd, Evangeline Lilly, Michael Peña, Walton Goggins, Hannah John-Kamen, David Dastmalchian, T.I., Judy Greer, Bobby Cannavale, Randall Park, Abby Ryder Fortson, Michelle Pfeiffer, Laurence Fishburne, Michael Douglas	
J U L Y	6	Sorry to Bother You	Annapurna Pictures	Boots Riley (director/screenplay); LaKeith Stanfield, Tessa Thompson, Jermaine Fowler, Omari Hardwick, Terry Crews, Patton Oswalt, David Cross, Danny Glover, Steven Yeun, Armie Hammer	
J U L Y	6	Whitney	Roadside Attractions / Miramax	Kevin Macdonald (director/screenplay); Whitney Houston	
J U L Y	13	Hotel Transylvania 3: Summer Vacation	Sony Pictures Animation / MRC	Genndy Tartakovsky (director/screenplay); Michael McCullers (screenplay); Adam Sandler, Andy Samberg, Selena Gomez, Kevin James, David Spade, Steve Buscemi, Keegan-Michael Key, Molly Shannon, Fran Drescher, Kathryn Hahn, Jim Gaffigan, Mel Brooks	
J U L Y	13	Skyscraper	Universal Pictures / Legendary Pictures	Rawson Marshall Thurber (director/screenplay); Dwayne Johnson, Neve Campbell, Chin Han, Roland Møller, Noah Taylor, Byron Mann, Pablo Schreiber, Hannah Quinlivan	
J U L Y	13	Eighth Grade	A24	Bo Burnham (director/screenplay); Elsie Fisher, Josh Hamilton, Emily Robinson, Jake Ryan, Fred Hechinger	
J U L Y	13	Don't Worry, He Won't Get Far on Foot	Amazon Studios	Gus Van Sant (director/screenplay); Joaquin Phoenix, Jonah Hill, Rooney Mara, Jack Black	
J U L Y	13	Shock and Awe	Vertical Entertainment	Rob Reiner (director); Joey Hartstone (screenplay); Woody Harrelson, James Marsden, Rob Reiner, Jessica Biel, Milla Jovovich, Tommy Lee Jones	
J U L Y	20	Mamma Mia! Here We Go Again	Universal Pictures / Legendary Pictures / Perfect World Pictures / Playtone	Ol Parker (director/screenplay); Christine Baranski, Pierce Brosnan, Dominic Cooper, Colin Firth, Andy García, Lily James, Amanda Seyfried, Stellan Skarsgård, Julie Walters, Cher, Meryl Streep	
J U L Y	20	The Equalizer 2	Columbia Pictures / Escape Artists	Antoine Fuqua (director); Richard Wenk (screenplay); Denzel Washington, Pedro Pascal, Ashton Sanders, Bill Pullman, Melissa Leo	
J U L Y	20	Blindspotting	Summit Entertainment / CodeBlack Films	Carlos López Estrada (director); Rafael Casal, Daveed Diggs (screenplay); Daveed Diggs, Rafael Casal, Janina Gavankar, Jasmine Cephas Jones, Ethan Embry, Tisha Campbell, Utkarsh Ambudkar, Wayne Knight	
J U L Y	20	Unfriended: Dark Web	BH Tilt	Stephen Susco (director/screenplay); Colin Woodell, Rebecca Rittenhouse, Betty Gabriel, Andrew Lees, Connor Del Rio, Stephanie Nogueras, Savira Windyani	
J U L Y	27	Mission: Impossible – Fallout	Paramount Pictures / Skydance Media / Bad Robot	Christopher McQuarrie (director/screenplay); Tom Cruise, Henry Cavill, Ving Rhames, Simon Pegg, Rebecca Ferguson, Sean Harris, Angela Bassett, Vanessa Kirby, Michelle Monaghan, Alec Baldwin	
J U L Y	27	Teen Titans Go! To the Movies	Warner Bros. Pictures / Warner Bros. Animation / DC Entertainment	Peter Rida Michail (director); Aaron Horvath (director/screenplay); Michael Jelenic (screenplay); Greg Cipes, Scott Menville, Khary Payton, Tara Strong, Hynden Walch, Will Arnett, Kristen Bell	
J U L Y	27	Hot Summer Nights	A24	Elijah Bynum (director/screenplay); Timothée Chalamet, Maika Monroe, Alex Roe, Maia Mitchell, William Fichtner, Thomas Jane, Emory Cohen, Rachel O'Shaughnessy	
J U L Y	27	Puzzle	Sony Pictures Classics	Marc Turtletaub (director); Oren Moverman, Polly Mann (screenplay); Kelly Macdonald, Irrfan Khan, David Denman, Bubba Weiler, Austin Abrams, Liv Hewson	
J U L Y	27	Extinction	Netflix	Ben Young (director); Spenser Cohen, Brad Kane (screenplay); Michael Peña, Lizzy Caplan, Mike Colter, Amelia Crouch, Erica Tremblay, Israel Broussard, Lex Shrapnel, Emma Booth	
A U G U S T	3	Christopher Robin	Walt Disney Pictures	Marc Forster (director); Alex Ross Perry, Tom McCarthy, Allison Schroeder (screenplay); Ewan McGregor, Hayley Atwell, Jim Cummings, Brad Garrett	
A U G U S T	3	The Darkest Minds	20th Century Fox / 21 Laps Entertainment	Jennifer Yuh Nelson (director); Chad Hodge (screenplay); Amandla Stenberg, Harris Dickinson, Mandy Moore, Patrick Gibson, Skylan Brooks, Miya Cech, Bradley Whitford, Gwendoline Christie	
A U G U S T	3	The Spy Who Dumped Me	Lionsgate / Imagine Entertainment	Susanna Fogel (director/screenplay); David Iserson (screenplay); Mila Kunis, Kate McKinnon, Justin Theroux, Sam Heughan	
A U G U S T	3	The Miseducation of Cameron Post	FilmRise	Desiree Akhavan (director/screenplay); Cecilia Frugiuele (screenplay); Chloë Grace Moretz, John Gallagher Jr., Sasha Lane, Forrest Goodluck, Marin Ireland, Owen Campbell, Kerry Butler, Quinn Shephard, Emily Skeggs, Melanie Ehrlich, Jennifer Ehle	
A U G U S T	3	Never Goin' Back	A24	Augustine Frizzell (director/screenplay); Maia Mitchell, Camila Morrone	
A U G U S T	8	Dog Days	LD Entertainment	Ken Marino (director); Elissa Matsueda, Erica Oyama (screenplay); Nina Dobrev, Vanessa Hudgens, Adam Pally, Eva Longoria, Rob Corddry, Tone Bell, Jon Bass, Michael Cassidy, Thomas Lennon, Tig Notaro, Finn Wolfhard, Ron Cephas Jones	
A U G U S T	10	The Meg	Warner Bros. Pictures	Jon Turteltaub (director); Dean Georgaris, Jon Hoeber, Erich Hoeber (screenplay); Jason Statham, Li Bingbing, Rainn Wilson, Ruby Rose, Winston Chao, Cliff Curtis	
A U G U S T	10	BlacKkKlansman	Focus Features / Legendary Pictures / Perfect World Pictures / Monkeypaw Productions / QC Entertainment / 40 Acres and a Mule Filmworks	Spike Lee (director/screenplay); Charlie Wachtel, David Rabinowitz, Kevin Willmott (screenplay); John David Washington, Adam Driver, Laura Harrier, Topher Grace	
A U G U S T	10	Slender Man	Screen Gems	Sylvain White (director); David Birke (screenplay); Julia Goldani Telles, Joey King, Jaz Sinclair, Annalise Basso, Javier Botet	
A U G U S T	10	A Prayer Before Dawn	A24	Jean-Stéphane Sauvaire (director); Jonathan Hirschbein, Nick Saltrese (screenplay); Joe Cole	
A U G U S T	10	Elizabeth Harvest	IFC Films	Sebastian Gutierrez (director/screenplay); Abbey Lee, Matthew Beard, Carla Gugino, Ciarán Hinds, Dylan Baker	
A U G U S T	15	Crazy Rich Asians	Warner Bros. Pictures	Jon M. Chu (director); Peter Chiarelli, Adele Lim (screenplay); Constance Wu, Henry Golding, Gemma Chan, Lisa Lu, Awkwafina, Ken Jeong, Michelle Yeoh	
A U G U S T	17	Alpha	Columbia Pictures	Albert Hughes (director); Daniele Sebastian Wiedenhaupt (screenplay); Kodi Smit-McPhee, Jóhannes Haukur Jóhannesson	
A U G U S T	17	Mile 22	STX Entertainment	Peter Berg (director); Lea Carpenter (screenplay); Mark Wahlberg, Iko Uwais, John Malkovich, Lauren Cohan, Ronda Rousey, Nikolai Nikolaeff	
A U G U S T	17	The Wife	Sony Pictures Classics	Björn Runge (director); Jane Anderson (screenplay); Glenn Close, Jonathan Pryce, Christian Slater, Max Irons, Annie Starke, Harry Lloyd, Elizabeth McGovern	
A U G U S T	17	Billionaire Boys Club	Vertical Entertainment	James Cox (director/screenplay); Captain Mauzner (screenplay); Ansel Elgort, Taron Egerton, Emma Roberts, Kevin Spacey, Jeremy Irvine, Thomas Cocquerel, Rosanna Arquette, Cary Elwes, Judd Nelson	
A U G U S T	17	Juliet, Naked	Lionsgate / Roadside Attractions	Jesse Peretz (director); Tamara Jenkins, Jim Taylor, Evgenia Peretz (screenplay); Rose Byrne, Ethan Hawke, Chris O'Dowd, Denise Gough, Phil Davis	
A U G U S T	17	Down a Dark Hall	Summit Entertainment	Rodrigo Cortés (director); Michael Goldbach, Chris Sparling (screenplay); AnnaSophia Robb, Isabelle Fuhrman, Victoria Moroles, Noah Silver, Taylor Russell, Rosie Day, Uma Thurman	
A U G U S T	17	To All the Boys I've Loved Before	Netflix	Susan Johnson (director); Sofia Alvarez (screenplay); Lana Condor, Noah Centineo, Janel Parrish, Anna Cathcart, King Bach, Trezzo Mahoro, Madeleine Arthur, Emilija Baranac, Israel Broussard, John Corbett	
A U G U S T	24	The Happytime Murders	STX Entertainment / Henson Alternative / On the Day Productions	Brian Henson (director); Todd Berger (screenplay); Melissa McCarthy, Bill Barretta, Joel McHale, Maya Rudolph, Leslie David Baker, Elizabeth Banks	
A U G U S T	24	Searching	Screen Gems / Stage 6 Films	Aneesh Chaganty (director/screenplay); Sev Ohanian (screenplay); John Cho, Debra Messing	
A U G U S T	24	Papillon	Bleecker Street	Michael Noer (director); Aaron Guzikowski (screenplay); Charlie Hunnam, Rami Malek, Roland Møller, Yorick van Wageningen, Eve Hewson	
A U G U S T	24	A.X.L.	Global Road Entertainment	Oliver Daly (director/screenplay); Alex Neustaedter, Becky G, Alex MacNicoll, Dominic Rains, Thomas Jane	
A U G U S T	29	Operation Finale	Metro-Goldwyn-Mayer	Chris Weitz (director); Matthew Orton (screenplay); Oscar Isaac, Ben Kingsley, Mélanie Laurent, Lior Raz, Nick Kroll, Haley Lu Richardson	
A U G U S T	31	Kin	Summit Entertainment	Jonathan Baker, Josh Baker (director/screenplay); Daniel Casey (screenplay); Myles Truitt, Jack Reynor, Zoë Kravitz, Carrie Coon, Dennis Quaid, James Franco	
A U G U S T	31	Destination Wedding	Regatta	Victor Levin (director/screenplay); Winona Ryder, Keanu Reeves	
A U G U S T	31	Reprisal	Highland Film Group / Lionsgate Premiere	Brian A. Miller (director); Bryce Hammons (screenplay); Bruce Willis, Frank Grillo, Johnathon Schaech, Olivia Culpo	
S E P T E M B E R	7	The Nun	Warner Bros. Pictures / New Line Cinema	Corin Hardy (director); Gary Dauberman (screenplay); Demián Bichir, Taissa Farmiga, Jonas Bloquet	
S E P T E M B E R	7	Peppermint	STX Entertainment / Lakeshore Entertainment	Pierre Morel (director); Chad St. John (screenplay); Jennifer Garner, John Ortiz, John Gallagher Jr., Juan Pablo Raba, Tyson Ritter	
S E P T E M B E R	13	Mandy	RLJE Films / SpectreVision / Umedia / XYZ Films	Panos Cosmatos (director/screenplay); Aaron Stewart-Ahn (screenplay); Nicolas Cage, Andrea Riseborough, Linus Roache, Ned Dennehy, Olwen Fouéré, Richard Brake, Bill Duke	
S E P T E M B E R	14	The Predator	20th Century Fox	Shane Black (director/screenplay); Fred Dekker (screenplay); Boyd Holbrook, Trevante Rhodes, Jacob Tremblay, Keegan-Michael Key, Olivia Munn, Thomas Jane, Alfie Allen, Sterling K. Brown	
S E P T E M B E R	14	A Simple Favor	Lionsgate	Paul Feig (director/screenplay); Jessica Sharzer (screenplay); Anna Kendrick, Blake Lively, Henry Golding, Andrew Rannells, Linda Cardellini, Rupert Friend, Jean Smart	
S E P T E M B E R	14	White Boy Rick	Columbia Pictures	Yann Demange (director); Andy Weiss, Logan Miller, Noah Miller (screenplay); Matthew McConaughey, Richie Merritt, Bel Powley, Jennifer Jason Leigh, Brian Tyree Henry, Rory Cochrane, RJ Cyler, Jonathan Majors, Eddie Marsan, Bruce Dern, Piper Laurie	
S E P T E M B E R	14	Unbroken: Path to Redemption	Pure Flix	Harold Cronk (director); Richard Friedenberg, Ken Hixon (screenplay); Samuel Hunt, Merritt Patterson, Vanessa Bell Calloway, Bobby Campo, Maddalena Ischiale, David DeLuise, Bob Gunton, David Sakurai, Gary Cole, Will Graham	
S E P T E M B E R	14	The Children Act	A24	Richard Eyre (director); Ian McEwan (screenplay); Emma Thompson, Stanley Tucci, Fionn Whitehead	
S E P T E M B E R	14	Lizzie	Saban Films / Roadside Attractions	Craig William Macneill (director); Bryce Kass (screenplay); Chloë Sevigny, Kristen Stewart, Jay Huguley, Jamey Sheridan, Fiona Shaw, Kim Dickens, Denis O'Hare, Jeff Perry	
S E P T E M B E R	20	Hell House LLC II: The Abaddon Hotel	Shudder	Stephen Cognetti (director/screenplay); Vasile Flutur, Jillian Geurts, Joy Shatz, Dustin Austen, Brian David Tracey	
S E P T E M B E R	21	The House with a Clock in Its Walls	Universal Pictures / Amblin Entertainment / Reliance Entertainment	Eli Roth (director); Eric Kripke (screenplay); Jack Black, Cate Blanchett, Owen Vaccaro, Renée Elise Goldsberry, Sunny Suljic, Kyle MacLachlan	
S E P T E M B E R	21	Life Itself	Amazon Studios / Temple Hill Entertainment	Dan Fogelman (director/screenplay); Oscar Isaac, Olivia Wilde, Mandy Patinkin, Olivia Cooke, Laia Costa, Annette Bening, Antonio Banderas	
S E P T E M B E R	21	The Sisters Brothers	Annapurna Pictures	Jacques Audiard (director/screenplay); Thomas Bidegain (screenplay); John C. Reilly, Joaquin Phoenix, Jake Gyllenhaal, Riz Ahmed, Rutger Hauer	
S E P T E M B E R	21	Assassination Nation	Neon	Sam Levinson (director/screenplay); Odessa Young, Suki Waterhouse, Hari Nef, Abra, Anika Noni Rose, Colman Domingo, Maude Apatow, Bill Skarsgård, Joel McHale, Bella Thorne	
S E P T E M B E R	21	Little Italy	Lionsgate	Donald Petrie (director); Steve Galluccio, Vinay Virmani (screenplay); Emma Roberts, Hayden Christensen, Alyssa Milano, Adam Ferrara, Gary Basaraba, Linda Kash, Andrew Phung, Cristina Rosato, Danny Aiello, Andrea Martin, Jane Seymour	
S E P T E M B E R	21	Colette	Bleecker Street	Wash Westmoreland (director/screenplay); Richard Glatzer, Rebecca Lenkiewicz (screenplay); Keira Knightley, Dominic West, Eleanor Tomlinson, Denise Gough, Aiysha Hart	
S E P T E M B E R	21	Fahrenheit 11/9	Briarcliff Entertainment / State Run Films	Michael Moore (director/screenplay/narrator)	
S E P T E M B E R	21	Love, Gilda	Magnolia Pictures / Motto Pictures / 3 Faces Films	Lisa D'Apolito (director); Gilda Radner, Amy Poehler, Melissa McCarthy, Bill Hader, Maya Rudolph, Lorne Michaels, Jordan Walker-Pearlman, Cecily Strong, Martin Short, Laraine Newman, Chevy Chase, Paul Shaffer, Stephen Schwartz, Andrew Alexander	
S E P T E M B E R	28	Smallfoot	Warner Bros. Pictures / Warner Animation Group	Karey Kirkpatrick (director/screenplay); Clare Sera (screenplay); Channing Tatum, James Corden, Zendaya, Common, LeBron James, Danny DeVito, Gina Rodriguez, Yara Shahidi, Ely Henry, Jimmy Tatro, Justin Roiland	
S E P T E M B E R	28	Night School	Universal Pictures / Will Packer Productions	Malcolm D. Lee (director); Kevin Hart, Harry Ratchford, Joey Wells, Matt Kellard, Nicholas Stoller, John Hamburg (screenplay); Kevin Hart, Tiffany Haddish, Rob Riggle, Romany Malco	
S E P T E M B E R	28	The Old Man & the Gun	Fox Searchlight Pictures	David Lowery (director/screenplay); Robert Redford, Casey Affleck, Danny Glover, Tika Sumpter, Tom Waits, Sissy Spacek	
S E P T E M B E R	28	Hell Fest	Lionsgate / CBS Films	Gregory Plotkin (director); Seth M. Sherwood, Blair Butler, Akela Cooper (screenplay); Amy Forsyth, Reign Edwards, Bex Taylor-Klaus, Christian James, Matt Mercurio, Roby Attal, Tony Todd	

== October–December ==
Opening		Title	Production company	Cast and crew	Ref.
O C T O B E R	5	Venom	Columbia Pictures / Marvel Entertainment	Ruben Fleischer (director); Jeff Pinkner, Scott Rosenberg, Kelly Marcel (screenplay); Tom Hardy, Michelle Williams, Riz Ahmed, Scott Haze, Reid Scott	
O C T O B E R	5	A Star Is Born	Warner Bros. Pictures / Peters Entertainment	Bradley Cooper (director/screenplay); Eric Roth, Will Fetters (screenplay); Bradley Cooper, Lady Gaga, Andrew Dice Clay, Dave Chappelle, Sam Elliott	
O C T O B E R	5	The Great Buster: A Celebration	Cohen Media Group	Peter Bogdanovich (director/screenplay)	
O C T O B E R	12	First Man	Universal Pictures / DreamWorks Pictures / Amblin Entertainment	Damien Chazelle (director); Josh Singer (screenplay); Ryan Gosling, Claire Foy, Jason Clarke, Kyle Chandler, Corey Stoll, Christopher Abbott, Ciarán Hinds	
O C T O B E R	12	Bad Times at the El Royale	20th Century Fox	Drew Goddard (director/screenplay); Jeff Bridges, Cynthia Erivo, Dakota Johnson, Jon Hamm, Cailee Spaeny, Lewis Pullman, Chris Hemsworth	
O C T O B E R	12	Goosebumps 2: Haunted Halloween	Columbia Pictures / Sony Pictures Animation / Original Film / Scholastic Entertainment	Ari Sandel (director); Rob Lieber (screenplay); Wendi McLendon-Covey, Madison Iseman, Jeremy Ray Taylor, Caleel Harris, Chris Parnell, Ken Jeong	
O C T O B E R	12	Beautiful Boy	Amazon Studios / Plan B Entertainment	Felix van Groeningen (director/screenplay); Luke Davies (screenplay); Steve Carell, Timothée Chalamet, Maura Tierney, Amy Ryan	
O C T O B E R	12	The Oath	Roadside Attractions	Ike Barinholtz (director/screenplay); Ike Barinholtz, Tiffany Haddish, Nora Dunn, Chris Ellis, Jon Barinholtz, Meredith Hagner, Carrie Brownstein, Billy Magnussen, John Cho	
O C T O B E R	12	Gosnell: The Trial of America's Biggest Serial Killer	Hat Tip Films / GVN Releasing	Nick Searcy (director); Andrew Klavan (screenplay); Earl Billings, Dean Cain, Sarah Jane Morris, Michael Beach, Nick Searcy	
O C T O B E R	12	After Everything	Good Deed Entertainment	Hannah Marks, Joey Power (directors/screenplay), Jeremy Allen White, Maika Monroe, DeRon Horton, Sasha Lane, Dean Winters, Joe Keery, Gina Gershon, Marisa Tomei	
O C T O B E R	19	Halloween	Universal Pictures / Miramax / Blumhouse Productions	David Gordon Green (director/screenplay); Jeff Fradley, Danny McBride (screenplay); Jamie Lee Curtis, Judy Greer, Andi Matichak, Will Patton, Virginia Gardner	
O C T O B E R	19	The Hate U Give	20th Century Fox	George Tillman Jr. (director); Audrey Wells (screenplay); Amandla Stenberg, Regina Hall, Russell Hornsby, KJ Apa, Sabrina Carpenter, Common, Anthony Mackie	
O C T O B E R	19	Can You Ever Forgive Me?	Fox Searchlight Pictures	Marielle Heller (director); Nicole Holofcener, Jeff Whitty (screenplay); Melissa McCarthy, Richard E. Grant	
O C T O B E R	19	Mid90s	A24	Jonah Hill (director/screenplay); Sunny Suljic, Lucas Hedges, Na-Kel Smith, Olan Prenatt, Gio Galicia, Ryder McLaughlin, Alexa Demie, Katherine Waterston	
O C T O B E R	19	Wildlife	IFC Films / June Pictures	Paul Dano (director/screenplay); Zoe Kazan (screenplay); Carey Mulligan, Jake Gyllenhaal, Ed Oxenbould, Bill Camp	
O C T O B E R	19	What They Had	Bleecker Street	Elizabeth Chomko (director/screenplay); Hilary Swank, Michael Shannon, Robert Forster, Blythe Danner	
O C T O B E R	20	My Dinner with Hervé	HBO Films	Sacha Gervasi (director/screenplay); Peter Dinklage, Jamie Dornan, Andy García, Mireille Enos, Oona Chaplin, Harriet Walter, David Strathairn, Daniel Mays, Alex Gaumond, Félicité Du Jeu, Wallace Langham, Mark Povinelli, Helena Mattsson, Alan Ruck, Michael Elwyn, Ashleigh Brewer, Mark Umbers, Robert Curtis Brown, Sabina Franklyn, Savannah Stevenson	
O C T O B E R	26	Hunter Killer	Summit Entertainment / Original Film	Donovan Marsh (director); Arne Schmidt, Jamie Moss (screenplay); Gerard Butler, Gary Oldman, Common, Linda Cardellini, Toby Stephens	
O C T O B E R	26	Johnny English Strikes Again	Universal Pictures / StudioCanal / Working Title Films	David Kerr (director); William Davies (screenplay); Rowan Atkinson, Ben Miller, Olga Kurylenko, Jake Lacy, Emma Thompson	
O C T O B E R	26	Suspiria	Amazon Studios	Luca Guadagnino (director); David Kajganich (screenplay); Dakota Johnson, Tilda Swinton, Mia Goth, Angela Winkler, Ingrid Caven, Elena Fokina, Sylvie Testud, Renée Soutendijk, Christine LeBoutte, Fabrizia Sacchi, Małgosia Bela, Jessica Harper, Chloë Grace Moretz	
O C T O B E R	26	Indivisible	Pure Flix	David G. Evans (director/screenplay); Cheryl McKay, Peter White (screenplay); Sarah Drew, Justin Bruening, Eddie Kaulukukui, Jason George, Madeline Carroll, Tanner Stine, Michael O'Neal, Tia Mowry, Eric Close	
O C T O B E R	26	Bullitt County	Mr. Pictures	David McCracken (director/screenplay); Mike C. Nelson, Jenni Melear, David McCracken, Napoleon Ryan, Richard Riehle, Dorothy Lyman	
N O V E M B E R	2	Bohemian Rhapsody	20th Century Fox / Regency Enterprises / GK Films	Bryan Singer (Note: Singer was replaced by Dexter Fletcher towards the end of principal photography; in accordance with Directors Guild of America guidelines, Singer retained sole director credit, while Fletcher is credited as an executive producer.) (director); Anthony McCarten (screenplay); Rami Malek, Lucy Boynton, Gwilym Lee, Ben Hardy, Joseph Mazzello, Aidan Gillen, Tom Hollander, Mike Myers	
N O V E M B E R	2	The Nutcracker and the Four Realms	Walt Disney Pictures	Lasse Hallström, Joe Johnston (director); Ashleigh Powell (screenplay); Keira Knightley, Mackenzie Foy, Eugenio Derbez, Matthew Macfadyen, Richard E. Grant, Misty Copeland, Helen Mirren, Morgan Freeman	
N O V E M B E R	2	Nobody's Fool	Paramount Pictures / Paramount Players / Tyler Perry Studios	Tyler Perry (director/screenplay); Tiffany Haddish, Tika Sumpter, Omari Hardwick, Mehcad Brooks, Amber Riley, Whoopi Goldberg	
N O V E M B E R	2	Boy Erased	Focus Features / Perfect World Pictures	Joel Edgerton (director/screenplay); Lucas Hedges, Nicole Kidman, Joel Edgerton, Joe Alwyn, Xavier Dolan, Troye Sivan, Cherry Jones, Flea, Russell Crowe	
N O V E M B E R	2	The Other Side of the Wind	Netflix	Orson Welles (director/screenplay); Oja Kodar (screenplay); John Huston, Oja Kodar, Peter Bogdanovich, Susan Strasberg, Norman Foster, Bob Random, Lilli Palmer, Edmond O'Brien, Mercedes McCambridge, Cameron Mitchell, Paul Stewart, Gregory Sierra, Tonio Selwart, Dan Tobin, Joseph McBride, Dennis Hopper	.
N O V E M B E R	2	A Private War	Aviron Pictures	Matthew Heineman (director); Arash Amel (screenplay); Rosamund Pike, Jamie Dornan, Tom Hollander, Stanley Tucci	
N O V E M B E R	2	Prospect	Gunpowder & Sky	Zeek Earl, Chris Caldwell (director/screenplay); Pedro Pascal, Sophie Thatcher, Jay Duplass	
N O V E M B E R	2	Bodied	Neon / YouTube Premium	Joseph Kahn (director); Kid Twist (screenplay); Calum Worthy, Jackie Long, Rory Uphold, Dumbfoundead, Walter Perez, Shoniqua Shandai, Charlamagne tha God, Dizaster, Hollow da Don, Loaded Lux, Debra Wilson, Anthony Michael Hall	
N O V E M B E R	6	The Front Runner	Columbia Pictures / Bron Studios	Jason Reitman (director/screenplay); Matt Bai, Jay Carson (screenplay); Hugh Jackman, Vera Farmiga, J. K. Simmons, Alfred Molina	
N O V E M B E R	9	The Grinch	Universal Pictures / Illumination	Scott Mosier, Yarrow Cheney (directors); Michael LeSieur, Tommy Swerdlow (screenplay); Benedict Cumberbatch, Rashida Jones, Kenan Thompson, Angela Lansbury, Pharrell Williams	
N O V E M B E R	9	The Girl in the Spider's Web	Columbia Pictures / Metro-Goldwyn-Mayer / Regency Enterprises	Fede Álvarez (director/screenplay); Jay Basu, Steven Knight (screenplay); Claire Foy, Sverrir Gudnason, LaKeith Stanfield, Sylvia Hoeks, Stephen Merchant	
N O V E M B E R	9	Overlord	Paramount Pictures / Bad Robot	Julius Avery (director); Billy Ray, Mark L. Smith (screenplay); Jovan Adepo, Wyatt Russell, Mathilde Ollivier, John Magaro, Gianny Taufer, Pilou Asbæk, Bokeem Woodbine, Iain De Caestecker	
N O V E M B E R	9	The Ballad of Buster Scruggs	Netflix / Annapurna Pictures	Coen brothers (directors/screenplay); Tyne Daly, James Franco, Brendan Gleeson, Bill Heck, Grainger Hines, Zoe Kazan, Harry Melling, Liam Neeson, Tim Blake Nelson, Jonjo O'Neill, Chelcie Ross, Saul Rubinek, Tom Waits	
N O V E M B E R	13	Lazer Team 2	Rooster Teeth	Daniel Fabelo, Matt Hullum (directors/screenplay); Burnie Burns (screenplay); Burnie Burns, Gavin Free, Michael Jones, Colton Dunn, Nichole Sakura, Allie DeBerry	
N O V E M B E R	16	Fantastic Beasts: The Crimes of Grindelwald	Warner Bros. Pictures / Heyday Films	David Yates (director); J. K. Rowling (screenplay); Eddie Redmayne, Katherine Waterston, Dan Fogler, Alison Sudol, Ezra Miller, Zoë Kravitz, Callum Turner, Claudia Kim, Jude Law, Johnny Depp	
N O V E M B E R	16	Widows	20th Century Fox / Regency Enterprises / Film4 Productions	Steve McQueen (director/screenplay); Gillian Flynn (screenplay); Viola Davis, Michelle Rodriguez, Elizabeth Debicki, Cynthia Erivo, Colin Farrell, Brian Tyree Henry, Daniel Kaluuya, Jacki Weaver, Carrie Coon, Robert Duvall, Liam Neeson	
N O V E M B E R	16	Green Book	Universal Pictures / DreamWorks Pictures / Participant Media	Peter Farrelly (director/screenplay); Nick Vallelonga, Brian Hayes Currie (screenplay); Viggo Mortensen, Mahershala Ali, Linda Cardellini	
N O V E M B E R	16	Instant Family	Paramount Pictures	Sean Anders (director/screenplay); John Morris (screenplay); Mark Wahlberg, Rose Byrne, Isabela Merced, Margo Martindale, Julie Hagerty, Octavia Spencer	
N O V E M B E R	21	Ralph Breaks the Internet	Walt Disney Pictures / Walt Disney Animation Studios	Rich Moore (director); Phil Johnston (director/screenplay); Pamela Ribon (screenplay); John C. Reilly, Sarah Silverman, Gal Gadot, Jane Lynch, Jack McBrayer, Alan Tudyk, Alfred Molina, Ed O'Neill, Taraji P. Henson	
N O V E M B E R	21	Creed II	Metro-Goldwyn-Mayer / Warner Bros. Pictures	Steven Caple Jr. (director); Juel Taylor, Sylvester Stallone (screenplay); Michael B. Jordan, Sylvester Stallone, Tessa Thompson, Wood Harris, Phylicia Rashad, Florian Munteanu, Dolph Lundgren	
N O V E M B E R	21	Robin Hood	Summit Entertainment	Otto Bathurst (director); Ben Chandler, David James Kelly (screenplay); Taron Egerton, Jamie Foxx, Ben Mendelsohn, Eve Hewson, Jamie Dornan	
N O V E M B E R	21	Roma	Netflix / Participant Media	Alfonso Cuarón (director/screenplay); Yalitza Aparicio, Marina de Tavira, Jorge Antonio Guerrero	
N O V E M B E R	22	The Christmas Chronicles	Netflix / 1492 Pictures	Clay Kaytis (director); Matt Lieberman (screenplay); Kurt Russell, Judah Lewis, Darby Camp, Kimberly Williams-Paisley, Oliver Hudson, Lamorne Morris, Vella Lovell, Martin Roach, Goldie Hawn	
N O V E M B E R	23	The Favourite	Fox Searchlight Pictures / Film4 Productions	Yorgos Lanthimos (director); Deborah Davis, Tony McNamara (screenplay); Olivia Colman, Emma Stone, Rachel Weisz	
N O V E M B E R	29	Mowgli: Legend of the Jungle	Netflix / The Imaginarium	Andy Serkis (director); Callie Kloves (screenplay); Christian Bale, Cate Blanchett, Benedict Cumberbatch, Naomie Harris, Andy Serkis, Matthew Rhys, Freida Pinto, Rohan Chand	
N O V E M B E R	30	The Possession of Hannah Grace	Screen Gems	Diederik van Rooijen (director); Brian Sieve (screenplay); Shay Mitchell, Grey Damon, Kirby Johnson, Stana Katic	
D E C E M B E R	4	The Cabin	Coast ART Productions / KW Studios	Johan Bodell (director); Erik Kammerland (screenplay); Christopher Lee Page, Caitlin Crommett, Erik Kammerland, Thomas Hedengra	
D E C E M B E R	7	Mary Queen of Scots	Focus Features / Perfect World Pictures / Working Title Films	Josie Rourke (director); Beau Willimon (screenplay); Saoirse Ronan, Margot Robbie, Jack Lowden, Joe Alwyn, David Tennant, Guy Pearce	
D E C E M B E R	7	Ben Is Back	LD Entertainment / Lionsgate / Roadside Attractions	Peter Hedges (director/screenplay); Julia Roberts, Lucas Hedges, Courtney B. Vance	
D E C E M B E R	14	Spider-Man: Into the Spider-Verse	Columbia Pictures / Marvel Entertainment / Sony Pictures Animation / Pascal Pictures	Bob Persichetti, Peter Ramsey, Rodney Rothman (directors); Phil Lord, Rodney Rothman (screenplay); Shameik Moore, Jake Johnson, Hailee Steinfeld, Mahershala Ali, Brian Tyree Henry, Lily Tomlin, Lauren Vélez, John Mulaney, Kimiko Glenn, Nicolas Cage, Liev Schreiber	
D E C E M B E R	14	Mortal Engines	Universal Pictures / Media Rights Capital / Perfect World Pictures / WingNut Films	Christian Rivers (director); Fran Walsh, Philippa Boyens, Peter Jackson (screenplay); Hera Hilmar, Robert Sheehan, Hugo Weaving, Jihae, Ronan Raftery, Leila George, Patrick Malahide, Stephen Lang	
D E C E M B E R	14	The Mule	Warner Bros. Pictures	Clint Eastwood (director); Nick Schenk (screenplay); Clint Eastwood, Bradley Cooper, Laurence Fishburne, Michael Peña, Dianne Wiest, Andy García	
D E C E M B E R	14	If Beale Street Could Talk	Annapurna Pictures / Plan B Entertainment	Barry Jenkins (director/screenplay); KiKi Layne, Stephan James, Colman Domingo, Teyonah Parris, Michael Beach, Dave Franco, Diego Luna, Pedro Pascal, Ed Skrein, Brian Tyree Henry, Regina King	
D E C E M B E R	19	Mary Poppins Returns	Walt Disney Pictures	Rob Marshall (director); David Magee (screenplay); Emily Blunt, Lin-Manuel Miranda, Ben Whishaw, Emily Mortimer, Julie Walters, Colin Firth, Meryl Streep	
D E C E M B E R	21	Aquaman	Warner Bros. Pictures / DC Films	James Wan (director); David Leslie Johnson-McGoldrick, Will Beall (screenplay); Jason Momoa, Amber Heard, Willem Dafoe, Patrick Wilson, Dolph Lundgren, Yahya Abdul-Mateen II, Nicole Kidman	
D E C E M B E R	21	Bumblebee	Paramount Pictures / Allspark Pictures / Tencent Pictures	Travis Knight (director); Christina Hodson (screenplay); Hailee Steinfeld, John Cena, Jorge Lendeborg Jr., John Ortiz, Jason Drucker, Pamela Adlon	
D E C E M B E R	21	Welcome to Marwen	Universal Pictures / DreamWorks Pictures / ImageMovers	Robert Zemeckis (director/screenplay); Caroline Thompson (screenplay); Steve Carell, Leslie Mann, Diane Kruger, Merritt Wever, Janelle Monáe, Eiza González, Gwendoline Christie, Leslie Zemeckis, Siobhan Williams, Neil Jackson	
D E C E M B E R	21	Second Act	STX Entertainment	Peter Segal (director); Justin Zackham, Elaine Goldsmith-Thomas (screenplay); Jennifer Lopez, Leah Remini, Vanessa Hudgens, Treat Williams, Milo Ventimiglia	
D E C E M B E R	25	Holmes & Watson	Columbia Pictures / Gary Sanchez Productions / Mosaic Media Group	Etan Cohen (director/screenplay); Will Ferrell, John C. Reilly, Rebecca Hall, Rob Brydon, Kelly Macdonald, Steve Coogan, Ralph Fiennes	
D E C E M B E R	25	Vice	Annapurna Pictures / Plan B Entertainment	Adam McKay (director/screenplay); Christian Bale, Amy Adams, Steve Carell, Tyler Perry, Alison Pill, Lily Rabe, Jesse Plemons, Sam Rockwell	
D E C E M B E R	25	On the Basis of Sex	Focus Features	Mimi Leder (director); Daniel Stiepleman (screenplay); Felicity Jones, Armie Hammer, Justin Theroux, Sam Waterston, Kathy Bates	
D E C E M B E R	25	Destroyer	Annapurna Pictures	Karyn Kusama (director); Phil Hay, Matt Manfredi (screenplay); Nicole Kidman, Sebastian Stan, Toby Kebbell, Tatiana Maslany, Bradley Whitford, Jade Pettyjohn, Scoot McNairy	

== See also ==
- List of 2018 box office number-one films in the United States
- 2018 in the United States
