= Insolera =

Insolera is a surname. Notable people with the surname include:

- Carola Insolera (born 1985), Norwegian model
- Emilio Insolera (born 1979), Italian actor and producer
- Humberto Insolera (born 1975), deaf Italian politician, academic, and advocate
- Italo Insolera (1929–2012), Italian architect, urban and land planner, and historian
