= Jean Massieu =

French deaf educator (1772–1846)

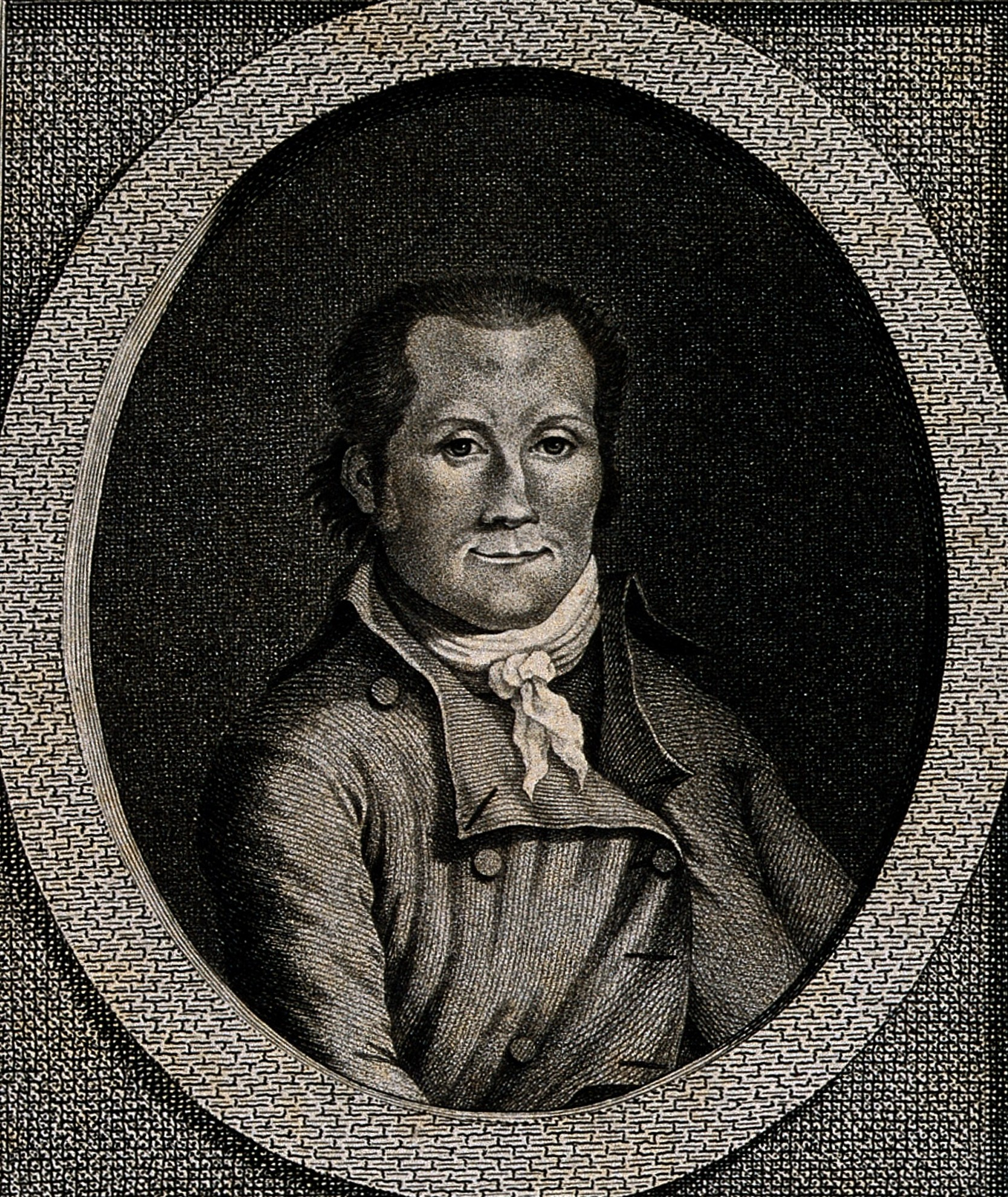
- Teacher, School founder
- Born: 1772; Semens, France
- Died: July 21, 1846 (aged 73–74)

Jean Massieu (French: [ʒɑ̃ masjø]; 1772 – July 21, 1846) was a pioneering deaf educator. One of six deaf siblings, he was denied schooling until age thirteen when he met Abbé Sicard, who enrolled him in the Institute national des jeunes sourds de Bordeaux-Gradignan, the Bordeaux School for Deaf Children. There he learned to read and write French, and later helped develop the first formalized French Sign Language. This French Sign Language was later adapted into American Sign Language. He taught at the famous school for the deaf in Paris where Laurent Clerc was one of his students. He began work after a scandal in Paris in Rodez and dedicated his life to educating deaf children. Later he founded a deaf school in Lille, France.

== Film ==
Jean Massieu is portrayed in the fictional film Sign Gene, the superhero film about deaf mutants who have superpowers through the use of sign language, as the fourth great-grandfather of Kate Massieu (played by Carola Insolera) the girlfriend of the leading character Tom Clerc, descendant of Laurent Clerc. The film is written and produced by Emilio Insolera and was screened in cinemas in September 2017.

== Quotes attributed to him ==
- "Let the Englishman have his coffee, and let me have my ham."—Jean Massieu
- "Gratitude is the memory of the heart", which has become a proverb in the French language.

== See also ==
- Ferdinand Berthier
- Roch-Ambroise Auguste Bébian
