= Laurent Clerc =

French-American educator (1785–1869)

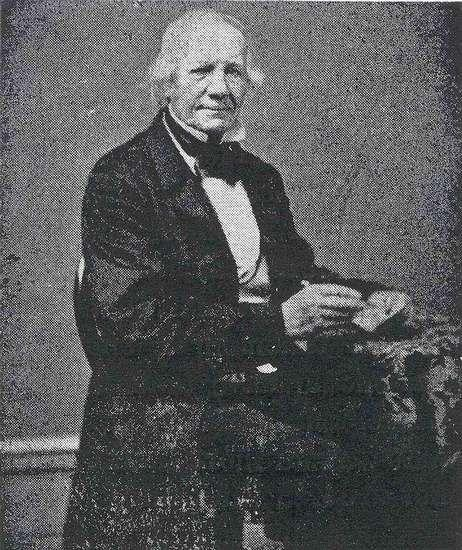
- Teacher, co-founder of the first permanent school for the Deaf in North America
- Born: December 26, 1785; La Balme, France
- Died: July 18, 1869 (aged 83); Hartford, Connecticut, U.S.
- Spouse: Eliza Crocker Boardman (1792–1880)

Louis Laurent Marie Clerc (French: [lɔʁɑ̃ klɛʁ]; 26 December 1785 – 18 July 1869) was a French teacher called "The Apostle of the Deaf in America" and was regarded as the most renowned deaf person in American Deaf history. He was taught by Abbé Sicard and Deaf educator Jean Massieu, at the Institution Nationale des Sourds-Muets in Paris. With Thomas Hopkins Gallaudet, he founded the first school for the Deaf in North America, the Asylum for the Education and Instruction of the Deaf and Dumb, on April 15, 1817, in the old Bennet's City Hotel, Hartford, Connecticut. The school was subsequently renamed the American School for the Deaf and in 1821 moved to 139 Main Street, West Hartford. The school remains the oldest existing school for the Deaf in North America.

== Biography ==
Laurent Clerc was born December 26, 1785, in La Balme-les-Grottes, Isère, a village on the northeastern edge of Lyon, to Joseph-François Clerc and Marie-Élisabeth Candy. Clerc senior was the mayor and the home was a typical bourgeois household. When he was one year old, Clerc fell from a chair into a fire, suffering a severe burn and obtaining a permanent scar on the right side of his cheek. Clerc's family believed his deafness and inability to smell were caused by this accident, but Clerc later wrote that he was not certain of this and might have been born with these sensory impairments. The facial scar later provided the basis for his name sign, performed with the manual alphabet for "U" (thumb out), with the pads of the two fingers stroked twice downward on the right cheek.

Clerc attended Institut National de Jeunes Sourds de Paris when he was 12 years old and soon became a teacher there. While there, he was taught by Abbé Sicard and Jean Massieu, who was Deaf. In 1815 he traveled with Sicard and Massieu to Britain to give a lecture and met Thomas Hopkins Gallaudet, who was traveling in search of means for instructing deaf children. Gallaudet had been treated with suspicion by Robert Kinniburgh of Braidwood's Academy, and so fatefully chose to turn to France, accepting an invitation to visit the school in Paris. Then in 1816, after a few months with Clerc at the school, Gaulladet invited Clerc to accompany him to the United States. During the trip across the ocean, Clerc learned English from Gallaudet, and Gallaudet learned French sign language from Clerc. After arriving in America they worked together to establish the first permanent school for the deaf in Hartford, Connecticut, which is now known as the American School for the Deaf.

Clerc married one of the first pupils – Eliza Crocker Boardman.

Clerc died at the age of 83 at his home in Hartford. The 1869 obituary in the New York Times says, Clerc came to Hartford in 1816 and became a teacher in 1817, then served more than 50 years "in the cause of deaf-mute instruction" and "his abilities, zeal, and graces of character made him always respected and loved."

== Legacy ==
Generally, prior to the onset of organized education of the deaf, deaf people were regarded as unintelligent and incapable of education. Laurent Clerc became one of the most recognizable figures in Deaf history of the United States thanks to his significant role in shaping deaf education. As a person who could neither hear nor speak from a young age, and, despite this, acquired excellent command of spoken languages at an age far past the prime years for language acquisition, he became an exemplary personification of educability and high intellect.

Largely due to Clerc's contribution to the education of the Deaf in America, several awards, buildings, funds, and other honors were named after him, most notably at Gallaudet University

== Film ==
Laurent Clerc is portrayed in the film Sign Gene, the superhero film about deaf mutants who have superhuman powers through the use of sign language, as the fourth great-grandfather of the leading character Tom Clerc (played by Emilio Insolera). The film was released in September 2017.

== Works ==
- "Autobiography of Laurent Clerc," Chapter III, in: Tribute to Gallaudet – A Discourse in Commemoration of the Life, Character and Services, of the Rev. Thomas H. Gallaudet, LL.D. – Delivered Before the Citizens of Hartford, Jan. 7th, 1852. With an Appendix, Containing History of Deaf-Mute Instruction and Institutions, and other Documents. By Henry Barnard, 1852. page 102.)
- The Diary of Laurent Clerc's Voyage from France to America in 1816 (West Hartford, CT: American School for the Deaf, 1952). 22 pages.
- An Address Written by Mr. Clerc and Read By His Request at a Public Examination of the Pupils in the Connecticut Asylum Before the Governour and Both Houses of the Legislature, 28 May 1818.
- Address at the Inauguration of Gallaudet University, 1864.
- "Reminiscences of Laurent Clerc," by L.C.T. Silent World, July 1871, pages 5–6. "Archived copy" (PDF). Archived from the original (PDF) on 2008-05-28.
- "Visits to Some of the Schools for the Deaf and Dumb in France and England," American Annals of the Deaf:
  - Volume 1, Number 1, October 1847 pages 62–66. "Archived copy" (PDF). Archived from the original (PDF) on 2008-05-28.
  - Volume 1, Number 2, January 1848, pages 113–120. "Archived copy" (PDF). Archived from the original (PDF) on 2008-05-28.
  - Volume 1, Number 3, April 1848, pages 170–176. "Archived copy" (PDF). Archived from the original (PDF) on 2008-05-28.

== See also ==
- American Sign Language
- Bilingual-bicultural education
- Deaf culture
- Deafness medical, vs disability and cultural models
- French Sign Language
- Roch-Ambroise Auguste Bébian
- Second International Congress on Education of the Deaf
- William Stokoe
