= Carmen Bucher Wirth =

Swiss-American hotelier

- Carmen Bucher Wirth in Rome, 1981.
- Born: March 19, 1913; New York City, U.S.
- Died: June 27, 2001 (aged 88); Rome, Italy
- Occupation: Hotelier
- Known for: Owner of the Hotel Hassler Roma
- Spouse: Oscar Wirth (d. 1968)
- Children: Roberto Wirth (d. 2022), Peter Wirth, Cristina Wirth (d.1976)

Carmen Bucher Wirth (March 19, 1913 – June 27, 2001) was a Swiss-American hotelier and the proprietor of the Hotel Hassler in Rome, Italy. She was a descendant of the Swiss hotelier Franz Josef Bucher, known for his role in the development of several early European hotels.

== Early life ==
Wirth was born Carmen Bucher in New York City on March 19, 1913, the fraternal twin of her sister Mercedes, and daughter of Otto and Marta Bucher. She had a younger brother, Robert. She studied law in New York and worked in the legal department of American Underwriters before relocating to Rome.

== Career ==
=== Hotel Hassler Roma ===
After the death of her husband Oscar in the late 1960s, Wirth became the owner and principal manager of the Hotel Hassler Roma. In a 1976 interview, she said that although she had not previously held an official role in the business, she had long observed the operations: “I realized I knew the hotel business—I had been watching it all my life.”

Throughout the 1970s and 1980s she modernized the hotel while preserving its traditional character, introducing new services, strengthening international marketing, and cultivating what newspapers repeatedly described as an "atmosphere of discretion and refinement". Newspaper coverage from the period described her as maintaining the hotel's established style while supervising renovations, staff policies, and guest services. The San Francisco Chronicle reported that under her direction the Hassler became a favored residence for visiting public figures and American travelers, characterizing the hotel's appeal as “old-world Rome with modern comforts.”

She appointed Nadio Benedetti as managing director in 1971, a collaboration noted in contemporary reporting for helping the hotel navigate labor conditions in Italy at the time.

Wirth commented publicly on women's roles in hospitality, telling the Los Angeles Times that “The hotel business is an exciting one for women. A good hotel is like a big household.” In another interview she stated: “A hotel is a home for people far from home. If they feel that, then we have done something right.” In 1992, she was awarded Hotel Magazine's prestigious Hotelier of the Year award

== Personal life ==
Carmen and Oscar Wirth had three children:

- Roberto E. Wirth
- Peter O. Wirth
- Cristina Wirth

Wirth spoke English, Italian, French, German, Swiss German, and some Spanish.

== Estate ==
Upon her death in 2001, her estate was divided equally between her two sons, including the property known as Borgo di Bastia Creti in Umbria. Roberto Wirth purchased Peter's share of the property in 2021.

== Legacy ==
Wirth was profiled in several U.S. newspapers during the 1970s and 1980s, which noted her management role at the Hassler and her family connection to the Bucher hotel-building tradition. Her work is also referenced in accounts of the Bucher family's contributions to hotel development in Switzerland and Italy.
