= The 355 =

2022 American film by Simon Kinberg

- Theatrical release poster
- Directed by: Simon Kinberg
- Screenplay by: Theresa Rebeck; Simon Kinberg
- Story by: Theresa Rebeck
- Produced by: Jessica Chastain; Kelly Carmichael; Simon Kinberg
- Starring: Jessica Chastain; Penélope Cruz; Fan Bingbing; Diane Kruger; Lupita Nyong'o; Édgar Ramírez; Sebastian Stan
- Cinematography: Tim Maurice-Jones
- Edited by: John Gilbert; Lee Smith
- Music by: Tom Holkenborg
- Production companies: FilmNation Entertainment; Freckle Films; Kinberg Genre Films
- Distributed by: Universal Pictures
- Release date: January 7, 2022
- Running time: 123 minutes
- Country: United States
- Language: English
- Budget: $75 million
- Box office: $27.8 million

The 355 is a 2022 American action spy thriller film co-produced and directed by Simon Kinberg from a screenplay by Theresa Rebeck and Kinberg, based on a story by Rebeck. The film features an ensemble cast, starring Jessica Chastain, Penélope Cruz, Fan Bingbing, Diane Kruger, and Lupita Nyong'o as a group of international spies who must work together to stop a terrorist organization from starting World War III. Édgar Ramírez and Sebastian Stan also star. The title is derived from Agent 355, the codename of a female spy for the Patriots during the American Revolution.

Chastain proposed the idea for the film while working with Kinberg on Dark Phoenix. The project was officially announced in May 2018, and distribution rights were acquired by Universal Pictures at the 71st Cannes Film Festival. Filming took place in Paris and London from June through September 2019. The 355 was theatrically released in the United States on January 7, 2022. It received generally negative reviews from critics and was a box-office bomb, grossing $27.8 million worldwide against its budget of $75 million, resulting in Universal losing an estimated $93 million on the film.

== Plot ==
At a location 150 miles (240 km) south of Bogotá, Colombia, a drug lord presents criminal mastermind Elijah Clarke with a special decryption program drive that can access any digital system on Earth. Clarke double-crosses and kills him just as the authorities raid the mansion. Amid the chaos, Colombian DNI agent Luis Rojas obtains the device. CIA operative Mason "Mace" Browne is assigned to purchase the drive from Rojas. She heads to Paris with longtime partner Nick Fowler, who is in love with her. The deal goes south when German undercover BND agent Marie Schmidt swipes the bag holding the money. Mace chases Marie, who escapes via the subway while Nick is confronted in an alley by Clarke.

At CIA headquarters, Mace learns that Nick was found dead in the alley. Her superior, Larry Marks, gives her his blessing to retrieve the drive by any means. Mace travels to London to recruit a longtime friend, retired British MI6 operative Khadijah Adiyeme. Rojas arranges to hand the drive over to Graciela Rivera, a DNI psychologist with no field experience. Marie is pushed to go after the drive by her boss, Jonas Muller, who brings up how Marie's father was a senior BND agent whom she personally turned after discovering that he was a Russian mole.

Mace and Khadijah track Luis and Graciela to a market only for the DNI agent overseeing the handoff to turn on them and kill Luis; before dying, he gives Graciela a phone only she can open that tracks the drive. Both Mace and Marie chase the thief, who escapes. Marie takes Graciela to a safe house with Mace and Khadijah arriving. Khadijah points out they all want the drive and are better off working together. The four track the thief to Morocco, apprehending him and taking out rival mercenaries before handing the drive over to Marks. While celebrating over drinks, news breaks of planes crashing, and cities hit by massive power outages—indicating the drive is in terrorists' hands. They return to the safe house to find Marks dead. After escaping from a CIA assault squad, the women realize they have been framed for Marks' death and the theft of the device.

Under interrogation, the thief reveals that the recent incidents are all part of a "demonstration" for prospective buyers at an illegal black-market auction in Shanghai. The group infiltrates the auction where Mace is shocked to discover that not only is Nick alive, but is secretly Clarke's mole in the CIA. The group fails to prevent him from obtaining the device, but a mysterious Chinese woman helps them escape the auction. She identifies herself as Lin Mi Sheng of the Chinese Ministry of State Security, and explains that the drive was used as bait to allow her agency to identify the criminals in attendance. She also tells Mace that Marks had been on Clarke's payroll, and that she took the device from Nick during their escape.

Clarke punishes Nick for bringing him a worthless decoy device but gives him a second chance. Nick then captures the group, revealing that he has Muller, Khadijah's boyfriend Ahmed, and Graciela's family as hostages. Nick executes Lin's elderly father in front of the group and has Muller and Ahmed executed on camera. To spare Graciela's family, Lin surrenders the drive and is abducted by Nick who needs her to authenticate the device.

The other women quickly overcome their grief when they realize that Lin is transmitting her location through a camera in her glasses. Arming themselves, they rescue Lin, shoot Nick, and destroy the drive before getting arrested by local police.

Two months later, Nick, now promoted to a senior rank in the CIA for killing Clarke, returns home to find Mace and the group waiting for him after escaping from custody. Nick passes out from a drug in his drink, having been told he will pay for his crimes by spending the rest of his life in a foreign prison. The women go their separate ways, but suspect they will somehow reunite to fight the corruption of their various agencies.

== Cast ==
- Jessica Chastain as CIA officer Mason "Mace" Browne
- Penélope Cruz as DNI agent and psychologist Graciela Rivera
- Fan Bingbing as MSS agent Lin Mi Sheng (as Bingbing Fan)
- Diane Kruger as rival German BND agent Marie Schmidt
- Lupita Nyong'o as former MI6 agent Khadijah Adiyeme
- Édgar Ramírez as Luis Rojas, a DNI agent
- Sebastian Stan as Nick Fowler, a CIA officer and Mace's former colleague and boyfriend
- Jason Flemyng as Elijah Clarke, a powerful crime lord
- Sylvester Groth as Jonas Muller, Marie's superior at the BND
- John Douglas Thompson as Larry Marks, Mace and Nick's superior at the CIA
- Emilio Insolera as Giovanni Lupo, a professional hacker
- Jason Wong as Stevens, an associate of the 355
- Leo Staar as Grady, a CIA agent

== Production ==
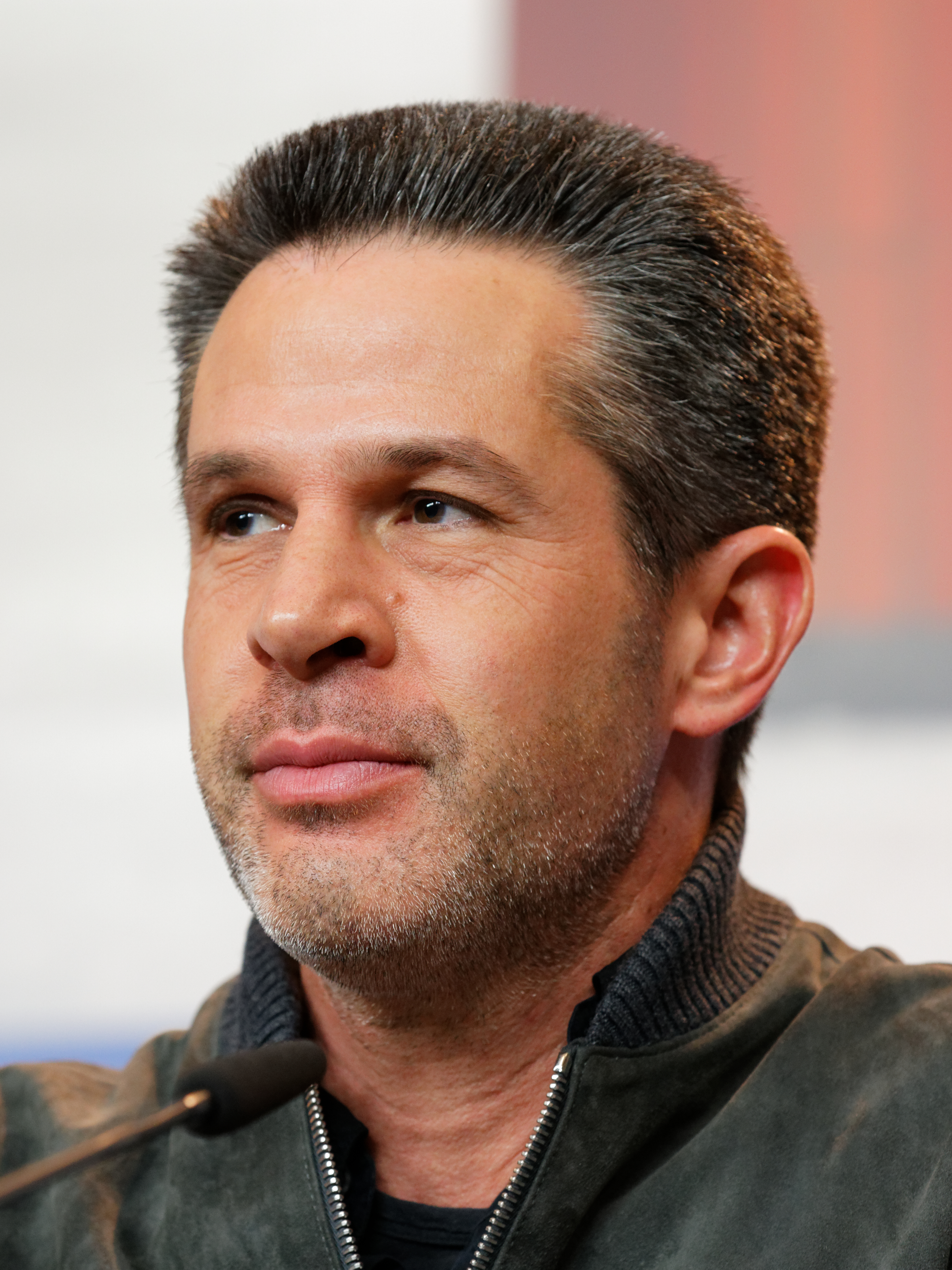
Co-writer and director Simon Kinberg

Jessica Chastain proposed the idea for a female-led spy film in the same spirit as the Mission: Impossible and James Bond series to her Dark Phoenix director Simon Kinberg while in production on that film. The concept was built upon and in May 2018, it was announced that Kinberg would direct the film with Chastain producing, in addition to her starring alongside Marion Cotillard, Penélope Cruz, Fan Bingbing, and Lupita Nyong'o. The project was pitched to buyers during the 2018 Cannes Film Festival, with Global Road Entertainment and Amazon Studios bidding for the distribution rights, and Universal Pictures ultimately winning the U.S. and UK & Ireland distribution rights for $20 million.

In February 2019, Chastain put out a request for suggestions in regard to the casting of male actors. In May 2019, it was announced Sebastian Stan and Édgar Ramírez had joined the cast of the film, with Cotillard dropping out. Diane Kruger was added in June, replacing Cotillard. Filming began in July 2019, shooting between Paris, Morocco and London, using locations including Senate House. In September 2019, Emilio Insolera joined the cast of the film. Additional filming took place in London in July 2020 with precaution protocols due to the COVID-19 pandemic. Tom Holkenborg composed the musical score of the film. After the trailer's release in October 2020, the casting of Cruz, a Spanish actress, as a Colombian psychologist attracted criticism. Chastain defended the decision, saying she wanted to evaluate "the international common thread that connects us all" and emphasize the importance of characters that "all come together to form an alliance beyond borders".

== Release ==
=== Theatrical ===
The film was released by Universal Pictures on January 7, 2022. It was originally scheduled to be released on January 15, 2021, but was pushed back a year from January 15, 2021, to January 14, 2022, due to the COVID-19 pandemic, before moving up by a week from January 14, to January 7. The film was released through video-on-demand on January 28, 2022. The film began streaming on Peacock on February 22, 2022. It was released on DVD and Blu-ray that same day, by Universal Pictures Home Entertainment. In the United Kingdom, it was released on DVD and Blu-Ray by MediumRare Entertainment, a division of Fremantle on April 24, 2022.

=== Marketing ===
The film's marketing across YouTube, Facebook, Instagram, and Twitter made around 120 million impressions online before The 355 opened in theaters. RelishMix said reactions to its promotional content were "mixed-negative as fans feel like they're being served a bit of a cliché cookie-cutter action package in the spirit of Charlie's Angels or 'James Bond's daughters' with a diverse mix of kick-ass supercharged women. Fans of Jessica Chastain, Lupita Nyong'o and Penelopé Cruz are super supportively cheering for success, but amidst the COVID resurge, moviegoers are tapping their finger for Peacock or another streaming service drop date."

== Reception ==
=== Box office ===
The 355 grossed $14.5 million in the United States and Canada, and $13.2 million in other territories, for a worldwide total of $27.8 million.

In the U.S. and Canada, The 355 was projected to gross $2–7 million from 3,145 theaters in its opening weekend. Variety and Boxoffice Pro both said the film would underperform at the box office, in part due to its 45-day theatrical timeframe, the ongoing success of Spider-Man: No Way Home, and the rising spread of the Omicron variant.

The film earned $1.72 million on its first day, including an estimated $350,000 from Thursday night previews. It went on to debut to $4.6 million, finishing third at the box office behind holdovers Spider-Man: No Way Home and Sing 2. The film went on to earn $2.3 million in its second weekend, $1.6 million in its third, $1.3 million in its fourth, and $698,275 in its fifth. The 355 dropped out of the box office top ten in its sixth weekend, finishing 23rd with $99,615.

Audiences during its opening were 56% female, 73% above the age of 25, 40% between 25 and 44, and 33% above the age of 45. The ethnic breakdown of the audience showed that 50% were Caucasian, 21% Hispanic or Latino, 17% African American, and 12% Asian/other.

=== Critical response ===
The 355 garnered negative reviews from critics. On the review aggregator website Rotten Tomatoes, 24% of 226 critics' reviews are positive, with an average rating of 4.5/10. The website's consensus reads: "It has a stellar cast and it's conceptually progressive, but The 355 squanders it all on a forgettable story, unremarkably told." Metacritic, which uses a weighted average, assigned the film a score of 40 out of 100, based on 40 critics, indicating "mixed or average" reviews. Audiences polled by CinemaScore gave the film an average grade of "B+" on an A+ to F scale, while PostTrak reported 76% of audience members gave it a positive score.

Robbie Collin of The Daily Telegraph described the film as "standard spies-gone-rogue fare repackaged in girl-power wrapping" and "despite the strong cast, this is the film equivalent of a corn-syrup based fizzy drink being passed off as chic in taller, slimmer cans". Mark Olson of the Los Angeles Times praised the performances of the cast and the "attempt to acknowledge that these women have, need to have, lives outside their jobs, even with an occupation like international intelligence" but concluded the film "feels familiar and a bit tired. Simply having women star in a sluggish iteration of an airport dad-novel espionage-action story is not inspiring on its own."

Kevin Maher of The Times criticized it as "lazy" and "box ticking". Empire's Helen O'Hara said "Jessica Chastain and director Simon Kinberg team up here to give the world a charismatic, female-centric team of super-spies to balance all those male-led spy thrillers. You just wish the story had been as innovative as the casting, and the twists less screamingly obvious to even those without secret-agent training." Benjamin Lee in The Guardian described the plot and action sequences as "generic" and concluded "simply replacing male action heroes with women and then standing back waiting for applause isn't quite enough". Clarissa Loughrey in The Independent compared The 355 negatively to other female-led action thrillers Atomic Blonde and Wonder Woman and argued that despite the film's premise of reversing stereotypical portrayals of women in spy movies, it's "a mark of progress only in how wholly unremarkable it feels". David Rooney writing for The Hollywood Reporter summarized the film as "not without suspense", praising the score and editing, but found the characters underdeveloped and opined "the impulse to put kickass women in charge for a change is commendable, but the journeyman result suggests the pitfalls of starting with the packaging instead of the storytelling inspiration." Christy Lemire of RogerEbert.com gave the film a score of one out of four stars, criticizing the action sequences, plot and writing. She furthermore added the film "squanders" the main actresses and described the dialogue as "inane".

In a more positive review, Leah Greenblatt of Entertainment Weekly said the film was "starry, silly escapism with pop-feminist flare and a passport". Variety's Owen Gleiberman wrote, "As action storytelling, The 355 is generic, over-the-top, and 20 minutes too long, kind of like a Netflix movie. But it's the well-made version of that corporate brew." Kate Erbland of IndieWire wrote "'The 355 might not be the boundary-busting breakthrough it was sold as, it's something better: a solid spy flick that adds something new to the genre without totally upending it. That's refreshing in its own way."

== See also ==
- The Doll Squad – 1973 film by Ted V. Mikels
