= Sign Gene =

2017 superhero film by Emilio Insolera - deaf film

Sign Gene: The First Deaf Superheroes
- Teaser poster
- Directed by: Emilio Insolera
- Written by: Emilio Insolera
- Produced by: Emilio Insolera; Ben Bahan; Dirksen Bauman; Alberto Abruzzese
- Starring: Emilio Insolera; Carola Insolera; Ben Bahan; Hiroshi Vava; Humberto Insolera; Noboru Kuragawa
- Production company: Pluin Productions
- Release dates: September 8, 2017 (Milan); September 14, 2017 (Italy); April 13, 2018 (US); September 14, 2018 (Japan)
- Running time: 70 minutes
- Countries: Italy; United States
- Languages: English; Japanese; Italian; American Sign Language; Japanese Sign Language; Italian Sign Language
- Budget: €25,000

Sign Gene: The First Deaf Superheroes is a 2017 superhero film written, produced, directed and starred by Emilio Insolera. The story revolves around a deaf agent, Tom Clerc (played by Insolera), from New York City who is a carrier of a powerful genetic mutation. He is sent to Japan with his colleague, Ken Wong, to investigate crimes believed to have been committed by Japanese deaf mutants. The film's characters, both villains and agents, use sign language as their superhuman powers. The film also stars Carola Insolera, Ben Bahan, Hiroshi Vava, Humberto Insolera and Noboru Kuragawa.

The film makes several references to deaf history, culture, and sign language linguistics. Six languages are spoken and signed in the film: English, Japanese, Italian, American Sign Language, Japanese Sign Language and Italian Sign Language.

== Premise ==
Sign Gene is a genetic mutation present in only 29 out of the 300 genes responsible for causing deafness. All deaf mutants who are carriers of this genetic mutation turn out to be superheroes with the ability to create superpowers through the use of sign language. They are blessed with arcane powers such as being able to make doors close by signing the word 'close', or having their hands metamorphose into weapons which can spew fire by signing the word 'weapon'.

== Plot ==
Tom Clerc is a deaf secret agent who comes from a multi-generational deaf family. He is a descendant of Laurent Clerc, considered the Father of the Deaf in America. In the film, Laurent Clerc brought sign language to the United States two centuries earlier. Tom is a carrier of SGx29, the powerful Sign Gene mutation. However, he lost a significant portion of his powers during a battle with Jux Clerc, Tom's brother and the leader of the group 1.8.8.0., an evil organization dedicated to exterminating Sign Gene mutants.

Hugh Denison is the head of the Q.I.A. (QuinPar Intelligence Agency), an agency affiliated with the Pentagon and composed of selected agents with the Sign Gene mutation. Hugh sends Tom and his colleague, Ken Wong, to Osaka, Japan. The pair end up fighting a Japanese gang led by Tatsumi Fuwa. During their encounters with the gang, Ken and Tom learn that they can only win the conflict by conforming to the Japanese way. Along with his journey, Tom learns that his powers are not lost.

== Cast ==
- Emilio Insolera as Tom Clerc, mutant with superhuman powers, descendant of Laurent Clerc.
- Carola Insolera as Kate Massieu, descendant of Jean Massieu, pioneering deaf educator.
- Ben Bahan as Hugh Denison, head of the QuinPar Intelligence Agency and descendant of James Denison.
- Humberto Insolera as Jux Clerc, Tom's brother and the face of the 1.8.8.0. (International Genetic Genealogy Organization). The name of the organization makes reference to the Milan Conference in 1880.
- Hiroshi Vava as Tatsumi Fuwa, boss of a Japanese gang.
- Danny Gong as Ken Wong, Tom's colleague at the QuinPar Intelligence Agency.
- Noboru Kurakawa as Tatsumi Fuwa's personal bodyguard

== Production ==
=== Development ===
Sign Gene: The First Deaf Superheroes was shot in Japan, the United States, and Italy. Originally starting out as a short film, it garnered a groundswell of interest which led Insolera to believe the film had a chance of a larger production and attracting a bigger audience. He rewrote the script into a feature-length film. Casting opportunities were advertised by of word of mouth. Insolera was especially interested in actors who were native signers fluent in sign language.

=== Historical, cultural and linguistic references ===
Sign Gene: The First Deaf Superheroes makes several coded references to deaf history, deaf culture, and sign language linguistics. Q.I.A. stands for QuinPar Intelligence Agency, and QuinPar refers to the five parameters, the phonological components in sign language linguistics that form signs: handshape, movement, location, orientation, and non-manual signals. Agent Tom Clerc shares the surname of a famous figure in deaf history, Laurent Clerc, a deaf educator who brought sign language to the U.S., and 1.8.8.0. is a reference to the Second International Congress on Deaf Education, which took place in Milan, Italy, in 1880. It was there that educators codified their recommendation to eliminate sign language from deaf education. Figures such as Alexander Graham Bell and Jean Massieu are present in the film as well.

The film's plot pays homage to James Bond and Grindhouse.

== Release ==
The film had its world premiere on September 8, 2017, in Milan and was released in theaters by the UCI Cinemas on September 14, 2017. It had its U.S. release on April 13, 2018 and release in Japan on September 14, 2018.

=== Critical response ===
Sign Gene: The First Deaf Superheroes received positive reviews from critics. Michael Rechtshaffen of the Los Angeles Times, described the movie as one with a, "fresh, unique filmmaking voice" and a "fast-paced potpourri of stock footage combined with sign-language and stroboscopic action sequences performed by a deaf cast, video effects simulating grainy, scratchy film stock and that aforementioned all-enveloping sound mix, with an end result that proves as wildly inventive as it is empowering." The Italian newspaper, Avvenire, declared the film will mostly likely please the younger generation, who are "accustomed to the rapid and psychedelic language of Japanese video games or cartoons". Writing for ASVOFF, Giorgia Cantarini said that the story is intricate and "very fascinating. The sounds create an unexpected important part, sometimes overwhelming [to anyone] who is watching. [It] all happens very fast and astonishes you with a vibrant energy." Michela Trigari of Corriere della Sera, called Sign Gene an "experimental film" that uses science fiction as a medium to capture the imagination and "make visible what is invisible to the eyes."

Emilio Insolera appeared on the cover of Tokyo Weekender’s November 2018 issue taken by worldwide known photographer Leslie Kee and in thirteen full pages fashion story on Vanity Fair Italia's January 2019 number 5 with Carola Insolera taken by Rosi Di Stefano.

== See also ==
- List of films featuring the deaf and hard of hearing
