= Semens =

- Commune
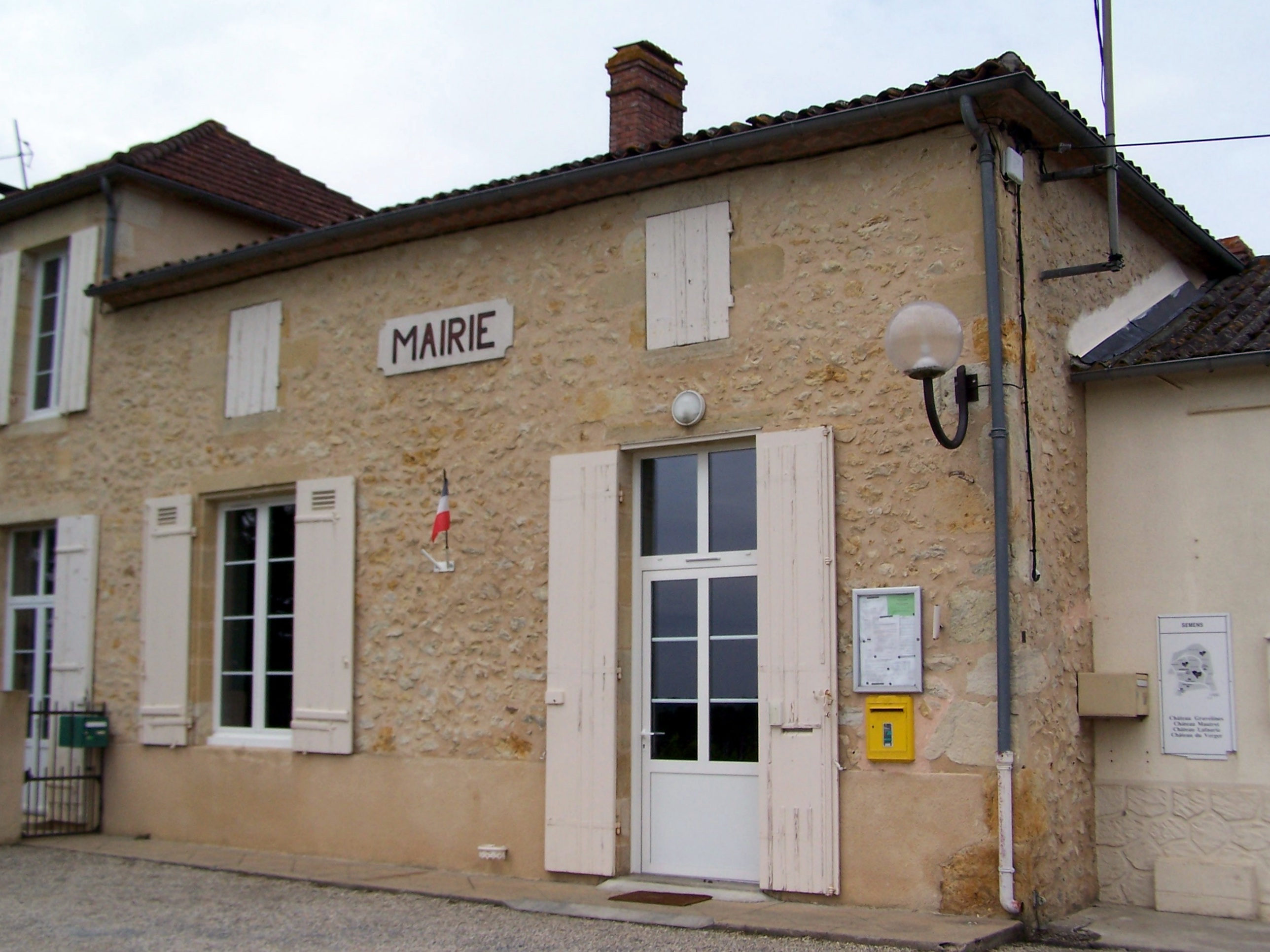
- The town hall in Semens

- Coat of arms
- Location of Semens
- Location within France Location within Nouvelle-Aquitaine
- Coordinates: 44°36′51″N 0°14′16″W
- Country: France
- Region: Nouvelle-Aquitaine
- Department: Gironde
- Arrondissement: Langon
- Canton: L'Entre-Deux-Mers

Government
  - Mayor (2020–2026): David Lartigau
- Area^{1}: 3.67 km^{2} (1.42 sq mi)
- Elevation: 70 m (230 ft)
- Highest elevation: 121 m (397 ft)
- Lowest elevation: 33 m (108 ft)
- Population (2023): 206
  - Density: 56.1/km^{2} (145/sq mi)
- Time zone: UTC+01:00 (CET)
  - Summer (DST): UTC+02:00 (CEST)
- INSEE/Postal code: 33510 /33490
- ^{1} French Land Register data, which excludes lakes, ponds, glaciers > 1 km^{2} (0.386 sq mi or 247 acres) and river estuaries.

Semens (Occitan: Plantes) is a commune in the Gironde department in Nouvelle-Aquitaine in southwestern France.

== Population ==
Historical population
Year	Pop.	±% p.a.
1968	172	—
1975	176	+0.33%
1982	130	−4.24%
1990	148	+1.63%
1999	170	+1.55%
2007	191	+1.47%
2012	196	+0.52%
2017	206	+1.00%
2023	206	+0.00%
Source: INSEE

== See also ==
- Communes of the Gironde department
