= Roberto Wirth =

Italian hotelier (1950–2022)

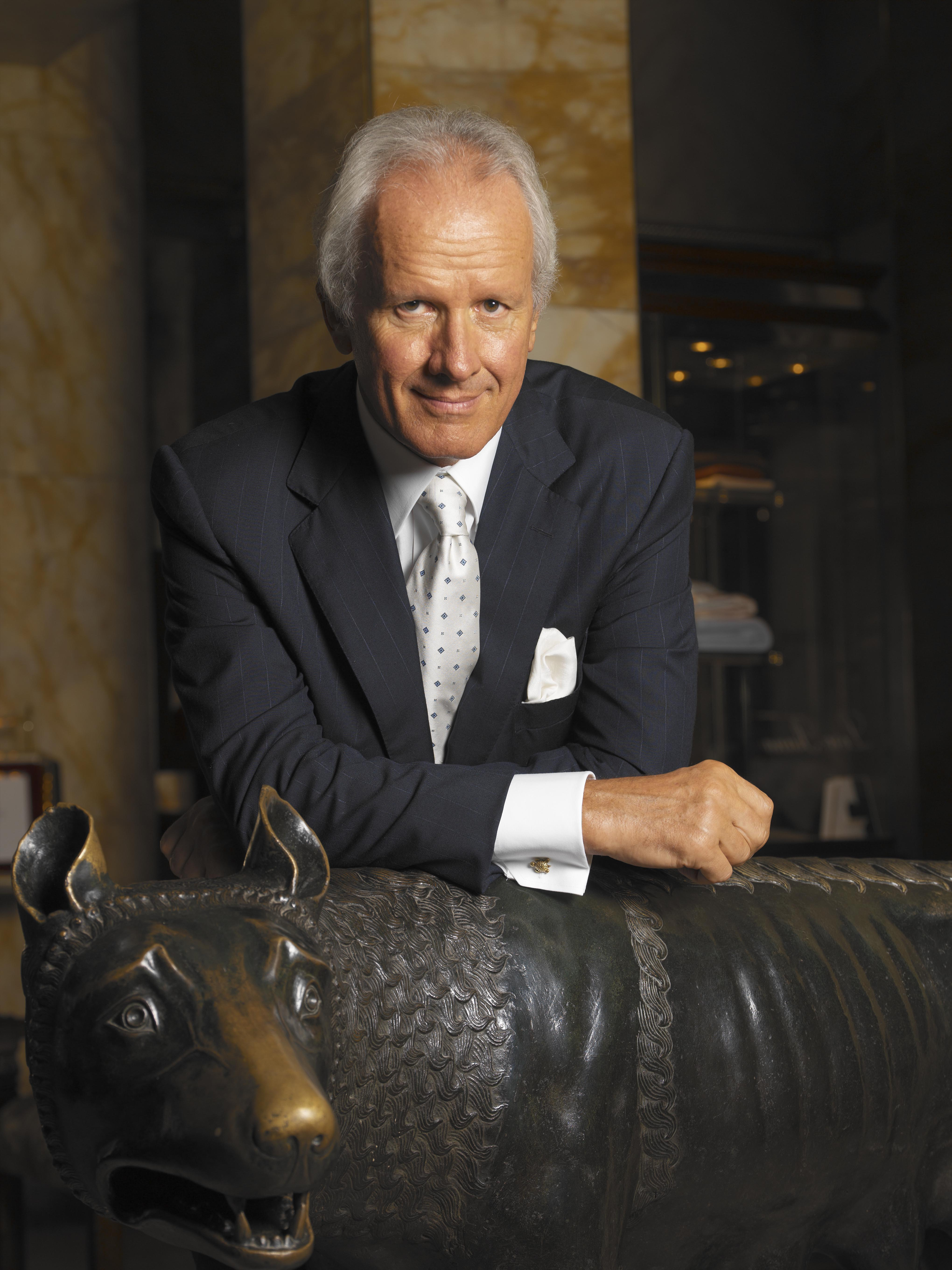
- Wirth at the Hassler in Rome
- Born: 25 May 1950; Rome, Italy
- Died: 5 June 2022 (aged 72); Rome, Italy
- Education: Cornell University, Ithaca, New York
- Occupation: Hotelier
- Children: Robertino Wirth, Veruschka Wirth
- Awards: 2005 Independent Hotelier of the World; 2006 Premio Campidoglio per l'Economia, Rome; 2014 Leading Legend Award; 2006 Honorary Doctorate degree in Humane Letters from Lynn University, Boca Raton, Florida; 2009 Honorary Doctorate degree in Humane Letters from Gallaudet University in Washington, D.C.; 2016 Honorary Doctorate degree in Humane Letters from John Cabot University in Rome
- Website: https://www.hotelhasslerroma.com

Roberto Enrico Wirth (25 May 1950 – 5 June 2022) was the owner and managing director of the Hotel Hassler, a five-star hotel located at the top of the Spanish Steps in Rome, Italy. Roberto E. Wirth represented the fifth generation of Swiss hoteliers. His parents Oscar Wirth and Carmen Bucher Wirth were both descendants of two families of hoteliers: the Bucher family from the Luzern area in Switzerland and the Wirth family from Maulach, Germany.

Wirth was born profoundly deaf. He was the founder and the President of Assistance Center for Deaf and Deafblind Children / Centro Assistenza per Bambini Sordi e Sordociechi Onlus (CABSS), a non-profit association dedicated to supporting deaf and deafblind children and their families. He had two children, twins Robertino and Veruschka.

Among the family properties, Roberto Wirth also owned the luxury resort Borgo Bastia Creti in Umbria, Italy and the ancient luxury residence dating back to the second half of the 18th century, Parco del Principe in Tuscany. Since 2018, he owned Hotel Vannucci in Città della Pieve, Umbria

== Early years ==
His father Oscar was the manager of both the Hotel Eden and the Hotel Hassler in Rome from the early 20th century. In 1964, the Wirth family became the sole owner of the Hotel Hassler. After Oscar Wirth's death, the hotel was managed by his wife Carmen Bucher Wirth. Roberto Wirth became General Manager in 1982, and in 2002, after the death of his mother Carmen, he purchased the shares of his brother Peter and became the sole owner of Hassler Roma S.p.A. and the hotel's President & Managing Director.

== Education and work experience ==
Roberto Wirth studied at the Hotel School "E. Maggia" in Stresa, Italy. He then moved to the United States to study at Gallaudet University in Washington, D.C. and at Cornell University in Ithaca, New York.

After obtaining his Bachelor of Science in Hotel Management from Cornell University, he worked in San Francisco and Honolulu for several years before deciding to move back to Rome and to the Hassler.

== Return to Rome and to the Hassler ==
While managing the Hassler he was often invited to participate with his staff in several culinary festivals in famous hotels around the world and was a consultant from 1997 to the Imperial Hotel, Tokyo for the management of the famous Restaurant Cicerone and to the Indian hotel chain Oberoi for the Italian restaurants in their hotels in Mumbai and New Delhi,

In 2002, together with a group of associates including wine experts Steven Spurrier and Hugh Johnson, Roberto Wirth founded the International Wine Academy of Roma in a restored Roman palazzo from the 1500s along the Spanish Steps. The intention was to create a place where wine lovers could meet for wine tastings or wine courses. A few years later, he turned it into a 4-room boutique hotel as part of the Hassler Hotel offerings.

== Awards ==
In November 2005 he received the prestigious "Independent Hotelier of the World 2005" award in New York which Roberto Wirth decided to dedicate to his native city, Rome, delivering it into the hands of Rome's mayor Veltroni during a private ceremony at the Hassler.

In February 2006 he was awarded the Prize for Economic Achievement (Premio Campidoglio per l'Economia) by Rome's Mayor and a few weeks later he received the Marc'Aurelio Prize, a prestigious award that the Deputy Mayor of Rome grants to those entrepreneurs who distinguish themselves for the work accomplished in the field of tourism in Rome.

In May 2006 he received an honorary doctorate in humane letters from Lynn University, Boca Raton, Florida, and in May 2009 he received a second honorary doctorate in humane letters from Gallaudet University in Washington, D.C.

In 2007 he was awarded the Order of Merit of the Italian Republic Le onorificenze della Repubblica Italiana for those who excel in the fields of literature, art, economics, philanthropy. He was also one of the eight deaf recipients of the DeafNation Inspiration Award (for Hotel Hospitality), was granted to him in August 2012 in Las Vegas.

In 2014, The Leading Hotels of the World conferred on him the "Leading Legend Award" for his contribution to the hotel industry and for his commitment to the art of independent hospitality.

On 16 May 2016, John Cabot University in Rome honoured Roberto Wirth with an honorary degree in Humane Letters.

On 14 June 2018, in the occasion of the 70th anniversary of the Fulbright Program in Italy, the United States Ambassador to Italy, Lewis M. Eisenberg awarded Roberto Wirth with a special prize for the commitment that for over 25 years he had dedicated to the promotion of the rights of deaf children from birth to 6 years of age.

== Deaf activism ==
Being profoundly deaf since birth, Roberto Wirth had always been very active in associations for the deaf. While in Hawaii, he was the Chairman of "Silent Aloha", an association which published a monthly newsletter for the deaf, distributed in the United States. He also served on the Committee for the Disabled of the City of Honolulu and held several speeches on deafness at various conferences of the Governor of Hawaii.

He had been conferred several awards and honors from associations for the hearing-impaired in the United States and in Italy and from other institutions, such as the Laurent Clerc Cultural Fund of the Gallaudet University in Washington, D.C., in July 1992 (for excellence in a field not related to deafness), as well as for his professional career as successful hotelier.

Since 1992, every year, the "Roberto Wirth" scholarship, in collaboration with the U.S.-Italy Fulbright Commission, is awarded to deaf educators of deaf and deafblind children. The winner of the scholarship attends Gallaudet University in Washington, D.C. the only bilingual (American Sign Language and English) university in the world that is fully accessible to the deaf and hard of hearing students and is able to train the professionals who will work in the field of deafness.

In 2004 he founded Assistance Center for Deaf and Deafblind Children / Centro Assistenza per Bambini Sordi e Sordociechi Onlus (CABSS), a non-profit association dedicated to supporting deaf and deafblind children and their families. CABSS provides multisensory early intervention programs.

In May 2015, Wirth published his book "Il silenzio è stato il mio primo compagno di giochi" (translation: "Silence was my first playmate"), with the journalist Corrado Ruggeri, an autobiography that tells of the complex life of a man born profoundly deaf and forced to confront the prejudices of others, starting with those of his own family. The copyright fees are donated to non-profit CABSS (Assistance Center for Deaf and Deafblind Children), the association founded by Roberto Wirth dedicated to the support of deaf and deafblind children.

== Education ==
- Primary School "G. Tarra", Milan
- Institute San Giuseppe Calasanzio, Rome.
- Hotel School "Maggia", Stresa, Novara.
- "American School for the Deaf", Hartford, Connecticut, USA.
- Gallaudet University, Washington, D.C., USA.
- Rochester Institute of Technology, Rochester, New York, USA.
- Cornell University, School of Hotel Administration, Bachelor of Science degree, Ithaca, New York

== Death ==
He died due to a heart attack on 5 June 2022, in Rome, Italy.
