= Humberto Insolera =

Italian politician (born 1975)

Humberto Insolera (born 1975) is a deaf Italian politician, academic and advocate for the deaf and people with disabilities.

== Early life ==
Insolera was born in a deaf family. He is a Fulbright scholar and studied in various universities: University of Bristol, Gallaudet University to University of Padua. He obtained a degree in international politics. After his academic studies, besides attending and delivering various seminars, conferences and workshops worldwide, he has worked for several international organizations.

== Career ==
Insolera has worked and collaborated for several international and national organizations mostly related to protecting the rights of deaf people.

=== International politics ===
In 2002, Insolera collaborated as an intern at the United Nations Office at Geneva in Switzerland, one of the four major office sites of the United Nations.

In 2006, Insolera participated in the UN CRPD (Committee on the Rights of Persons with Disabilities) Ad Hoc Committee meeting in New York, US.

In 2009, he was appointed board member of the European Union of the Deaf (EUD). From 2013, he was appointed Chair of the Accessibility Working Group and has worked also as a Member of the Expert Group on Human rights for the World Federation of the Deaf (WFD) until 2015.

In May 2017 he was elected to the EDF Executive committee by the EDF (European Disability Forum).

=== National politics ===
Insolera worked as a consultant on foreign affairs for the National Association of the Deaf in Italy known as the Ente Nazionale Sordi (ENS) from 2006 until 2012. Since 2007 is a lecturer of international politics, disability rights and deaf studies and is an accessibility observatory member of the ENS since 2011.

== Awards ==
Humberto Insolera received an award of appreciation by the CIO Dr. Yousif Asfour and Maha Zouwayhed at the American University of Beirut during the ABLE Summit in April 2019 in Beirut, Lebanon.

== Activism ==
Insolera was the first student in Italy to receive the stenotype service from the University of Padua after a collision with one of the university's representatives whom was denying to provide him access to education. Since then, numerous Italian students have had access to this service as well. Successively, he worked at Italian Youth Committee Member and coordinated the nation's first Italian Deaf Academic Conference for the deaf, deaf blind and hard of hearing delegates in 2011. It was later followed with a second one in 2016 under his guidance.

Insolera stars in his brother Emilio Insolera's film Sign Gene, the first superhero film about deaf mutants who have superhuman powers through the use of sign language. Insolera plays as Jux Clerc, the brother and main villain of the leading character Tom Clerc. The film was released in 2017.
