= Carola Insolera =

Norwegian deaf model (born 1985)

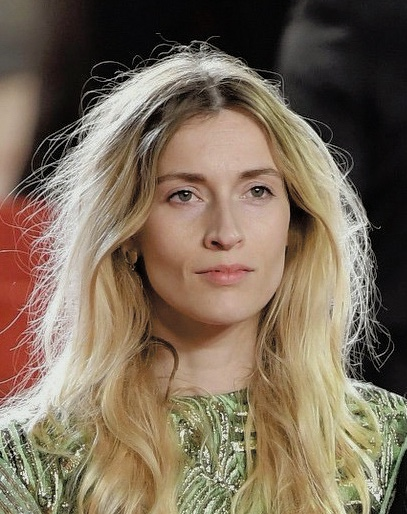
- Carola Insolera on the red carpet during the 71st Cannes Film Festival
- Born: Carola Wisny; 11 February 1985 (age 41); Oslo, Norway
- Occupations: Model; actress
- Partner: Emilio Insolera
- Children: 2
- Modeling information
- Height: 1.76 m (5 ft 9 1/2 in)
- Hair color: Blonde
- Eye color: Green
- Agency: Women Management Milano
- Website: http://www.carolainsolera.com/

Carola Insolera is a Norwegian born fashion model and actress signed with Women Management Milano.

== Early life ==
Insolera was born deaf and comes from a deaf family. Since early age, she was a very active entertainer in the sign language community, has worked in television as presenter and successively was involved in various programs and shows as an actress, as well as in the circus as a clown, trapeze artist, and contortionist. "Until the age of eight, the Norwegian model Carola Insolera believed that the Earth was populated by deaf people. Parents, siblings, relatives and friends: all around her communicated in sign language, stimulating in that lively little girl a great capacity for visual communication that over the years will become her «super power» in the hearing world".

== Modelling career ==
In 2011, she was asked to give a show at Copenhagen Fashion Week. Since then, Insolera has worked exclusively in the fashion industry either in catwalks and photo shootings for numerous brands. In Corriere della Sera, Insolera argues that her way of being has been beneficial to her because she makes use of the visual communication in her daily life "The deafness is an opportunity, an asset I would say. It enables me to reinforce my sight and my visual communication. I've always used it as a force element, kind of an advantage".

=== Catwalks ===
Insolera has commented that her deafness has not been a hindrance in being able to hear accompanying music while doing catwalks, because she relies on feeling vibrations through the runway. In an interview with Vanity Fair, she says "Someone has asked me how I would do catwalks when I cannot hear the music: actually, I can perceive the sound vibrations through the body, not just with the ears. A deaf person can dance, why not? And then, anyway, on the catwalks, all you need to do is just walking..."

=== Photo shootings ===
Carola does not use interpreters while performing during photo shootings. She instead prefers to work directly with professionals and communicate visually: "It forces me to look in people for a visual and emotional connection, differently from other models. I have to get in touch with the photographer and understand what he/she wants from me without the help of words but only through his/her facial expressions and my energy".

During her last campaign as a testimonial for Bagutta in 2017, Italian fashion photographer Stefano Guindani stated that it was an extraordinary experience for him working with Carola "her sensitivity, her ability to express herself with the body and move in front of the camera is unique, as unique is her personal story. The fact that she can only use the body to express herself makes it unique and perfect for this job as well as being an example for all".

In November 2018, Insolera was featured on the main poster of Leslie Kee's 20th anniversary photo exhibition "WE ARE LOVE" in Tokyo and in January 2019, she was featured in thirteen full pages fashion story on Vanity Fair Italia number 5 taken by Rosi Di Stefano

== Acting career ==
Carola Insolera starred in the Emilio Insolera film Sign Gene, the first superhero film about deaf mutants who have superhuman powers through the use of sign language. Insolera played Kate Massieu, the descendant of Jean Massieu and the leading character Tom Clerc's girlfriend. The film was released in theatres by the UCI Cinemas on September 14, 2017.

== Personal life ==
Insolera is in relationship with Emilio Insolera, whom she met while in Tokyo and has two daughters.

== Filmography ==
Year	Title	Role(s)	Notes
2011	Turnout	Bad Girl	Cameo appearance
2016	The God and the Queen	Queen	Short film
2017	Sign Gene	Kate Massieu	
2026	Feel My Voice	Caterina Musso	
