= Emilio Insolera =

American actor

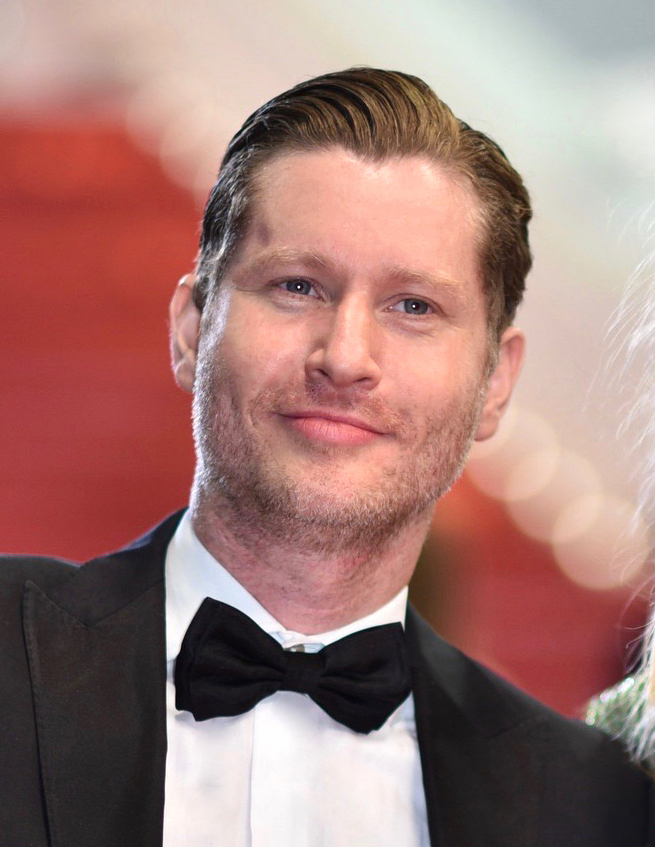
- Insolera at the 2018 Cannes Film Festival
- Born: 29 January 1979 (age 47); Buenos Aires
- Education: Gallaudet University; Sapienza University of Rome
- Occupations: Actor; director; producer
- Partner: Carola Insolera
- Children: 2
- Website: emilioinsolera.com

Emilio Insolera (born 29 January 1979) is a deaf actor and producer, known for Sign Gene: The First Deaf Superheroes (2017). In 2022, Insolera had a role in Simon Kinberg's The 355. Between 2022 and 2025, Insolera collaborated on feature films for Universal Pictures, Disney, Paramount Pictures and, most recently, Netflix and 20th Century Studios alongside director Ridley Scott.

== Early life and education ==
Emilio Insolera was born on 29 January 1979 in Buenos Aires, Argentina, into an Italian Deaf family, the youngest son of automotive toolmaker Alfio Insolera and bank employee Maria Cristina Drovetta, and has an older brother, Humberto, who is also deaf. Growing up, Insolera developed a keen interest in acting and filmmaking.

Following the rampant hyperinflation in 1989, Insolera's family moved back to Italy, first to Sicily later to various cities frequently, eventually setting in Rome. Prior to completing high school, Insolera was awarded the Fulbright and Roberto Wirth scholarship to attend Gallaudet University, in Washington, D.C., the only liberal arts college for the Deaf in the world. There, he earned his bachelor's degree in Film and Sign Language Linguistics. After freelancing for various indie film houses and working for MTV in New York City, he pursued and obtained a master's degree in Mass Communication with summa cum laude honors from the University of Rome La Sapienza. Although sign language is his native language, Insolera speaks and reads lips fluently. Currently, he can both speak and sign in four languages: Spanish, Italian, English and a bit of Japanese.

== Career ==
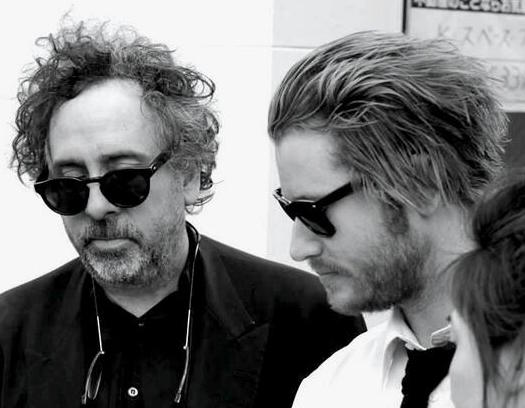
Tim Burton and Emilio Insolera in Tokyo

Insolera wrote, directed and produced the long feature superhero film Sign Gene: The First Deaf Superheroes. The film, shot between Japan, the US and Italy, centers on deaf superheroes who have the ability to create superhuman powers through the use of sign language. "Creatively, it all started with Japan," Insolera tells The Japan Times. "My first impression was that I had stumbled into the future, but as a linguist, I was also instantly fascinated with Japanese and how it has a relationship with sign language. Kanji are usually concepts or ideas and then hiragana acts as a bridge for communication. It's the same with sign language: we use finger spelling (spelling out the alphabet with your hands) between our conceptual signs."

The characters are blessed with arcane powers "like those, when signing with finger guns, hands actually metamorphose into bonafide weapons, replete with spewing fire and all sorts; or where, when signing the word 'close', of being able to make doors close at will."

Influenced by films such as Ridley Scott's Blade Runner (1982) and Black Rain (1989), as well as the animated 1988 film Akira, Insolera originally planned to make a short film but it garnered such a groundswell of interest with people offering to become involved, that Insolera, upon realizing it had the legs for a shot at the big time, had to rewrite the script into a feature-length. The casting came by way of word of mouth: Insolera was especially looking for native signers fluent in sign language.

The film had its world premiere on 8 September 2017 in Milan, was released in theatres by UCI Cinemas on 14 September 2017, had its US debut on 13 April 2018 and was released in Japan on 14 September 2018. The film was also presented at the Italian Pavilion, Hôtel Barrière Le Majestic during the 71st Cannes Film Festival.

Sign Gene: The First Deaf Superheroes received positive reviews from critics. On Los Angeles Times, Michael Rechtshaffen describes the "fresh, unique filmmaking voice" as a "fast-paced potpourri of stock footage combined with sign-language and stroboscopic action sequences performed by a deaf cast, video effects simulating grainy, scratchy film stock and that aforementioned all-enveloping sound mix, with an end result that proves as wildly inventive as it is empowering". On Avvenire it reads the film "will mostly like to the younger generation accustomed to the rapid and psychedelic language of video games or Japanese cartoons". Writing for ASVOFF, Giorgia Cantarini says the story is intricate and "very fascinating. The sounds create an unexpected important part, sometimes overwhelming who is watching. All happens very fast and astonishes you with a vibrant energy". On Corriere della Sera, Michela Trigari calls Sign Gene a film that uses the science fiction as a medium to capture the imagination and "make visible what is invisible to the eyes". The film is making waves, and has inspired Elena Pizzuto, an Italian linguist, to declare it "the symbol of activism for the visual community" and Paul Dakin, from Hektoen International, an "unlikely cult classic".

In November 2018, Insolera appeared on the cover of Tokyo Weekender taken by worldwide known photographer Leslie Kee and was featured on the main poster of the same photographer's 20th anniversary photo exhibition "WE ARE LOVE" in Ginza, Tokyo.

Starting from January 2019, Insolera collaborates with Striscia la notizia, an Italian satirical television program on the Mediaset controlled Canale 5 on the production of various shows. Striscia la notizia was ranked the most viewed television program of the spring season 2019 by Auditel.

During the same month, Insolera was featured in a full pages fashion story on Vanity Fair Italia with Carola Insolera taken by Rosi Di Stefano.

In September 2019, Variety announces that Insolera had joined the Simon Kinberg espionage The 355 alongside Jessica Chastain, Penélope Cruz, Diane Kruger, Lupita Nyongo, Bingbing Fan, Edgar Ramirez and Sebastian Stan. The $75 million-budgeted film was released by Universal Pictures in 2022. Academy Award Winner for Best Actress Jessica Chastain helped Insolera get an audition with Simon Kinberg and he landed the role of Giovanni Lupo, a hacker. The character communicates in American Sign Language (ASL) and "is the type of person who, like many deaf people in real life, was able to reach a very high level on his own. It's not explained in the movie but perhaps thanks to his deafness, Lupo may have had higher communication barriers and isolated himself to connect with technology to a great extent. Technology became his best friend", he commented.

In 2022, Insolera worked on the English dubbing for Disney's series Limbo by Gastón Duprat & Mariano Cohn. He voiced a deaf character.

In April 2024, Insolera was featured on the cover of a photo exhibition organized by LVMH Moët Hennessy Louis Vuitton and Supermagazine. The exhibition featured 30 international celebrities, each showcasing items from different LVMH Maisons. Insolera was dressed in Loro Piana, the Maison assigned to him. The magazine also included photos of his family, all wearing items from the brand.

In July 2024, Paramount Pictures released Here After, a thriller by Robert Salerno, in which Insolera worked as an ASL consultant.

In June 2025, Insolera took part in an advertising campaign for Tod's, a company specializing in luxury footwear, clothing, and accessories.

In September 2025, Insolera was featured in Vogue as one of the best-dressed attendees at the CNMI Sustainable Fashion Awards 2025. The event brought together prominent figures from the international fashion industry and paid tribute to Giorgio Armani, and was highlighted in the feature “All the Best Looks from the CNMI Sustainable Fashion Awards 2025.”

Insolera stars in the Netflix film Feel My Voice, directed by Luca Ribuoli. He plays Alessandro Musso, the father of a hearing daughter who dreams of becoming a singer. The film, released on April 3, 2026, is the Italian remake of La Famille Bélier, the acclaimed French film that also inspired the American remake CODA, winner of the Academy Award for Best Picture.

In The Hollywood Reporter, Etan Vlessing writes that for the character of Alessandro Musso, Insolera revisited both earlier films to combine the father's tenderness from the first version with the coarse language and roughness from the second adaptation. "Alongside those elements, I had to ensure that my character maintained a limited vocabulary, yet was still driven by a strong sense of purpose,” and he also drew on his Italian childhood in rural Sicily for inspiration and direction.

Emilio Insolera received critical acclaim for his performance. Silvia Levanti of IO Donna emphasizes that Insolera is “the true touch of originality.” Marilena Ciarlante of Today singles out Insolera for bringing authenticity and depth to the story. She praises his ability to make the character believable, seamlessly transitioning between comedic and dramatic moments with natural ease. Meanwhile, Camilla Sernagiotto of SkyTG24 highlights his role as the emotional heart of the family, noting that he portrays the character with remarkable expressive sensitivity.

The film ranked number one within 24 hours and remained in that position for over two weeks in Europe and South America. it was ranked within the top ten in 46 countries and was the second most-watched title worldwide for the week of 6–12 April.

Insolera has also worked with Ridley Scott on The Dog Stars, a 20th Century Fox film budgeted at $100 million starring Jacob Elordi, Margaret Qualley, and Benedict Wong. The movie is scheduled for release in August 2026.

== Activism ==
Insolera partnered with LISMedia and the Mason Perkins Deafness Fund to develop various media resources in sign language. Together with researchers Elena Radutzky and Mauro Mottinelli, he produced the first Italian Sign Language dictionary in digital format, which is now available as an app.

In 2025, Insolera launched the Deaf Movie Database. As Harrison Richlin from IndieWire explains, the DMDb is the world's first platform dedicated to cataloging films, television series, and media content that feature deaf actors, directors as well as professional deaf crews, sign language, and stories centered to deaf culture.”

== Personal life ==
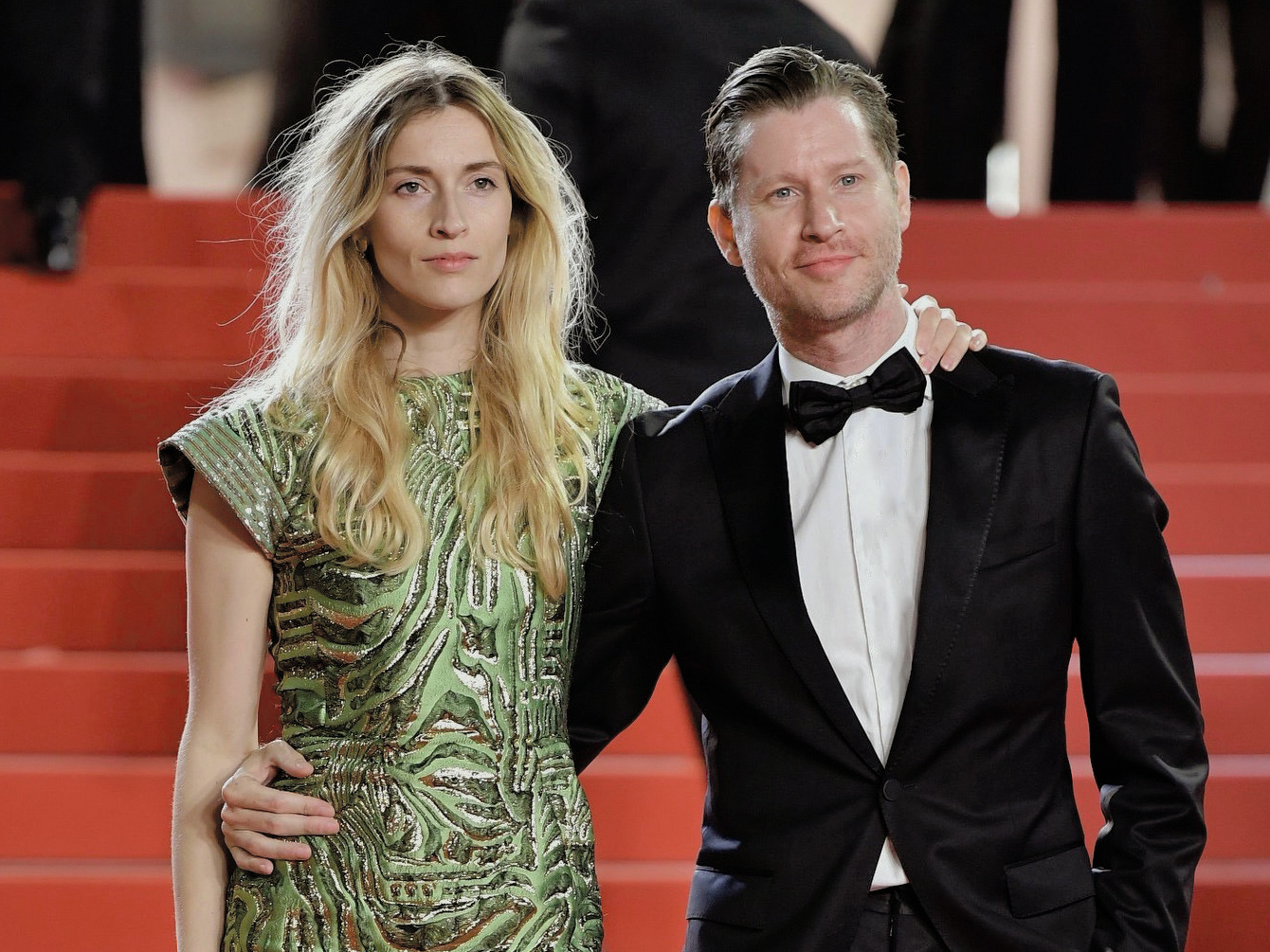
Carola Insolera and Emilio Insolera (2018)

He is in relationship with Norwegian model Carola Insolera, whom he met while in Tokyo and has two daughters.

== Filmography ==
=== Film ===
| Year | Title | Role | Notes | Ref. |
|---|---|---|---|---|
| 2016 | 180 Berlin | Esh | Short film | |
| 2016 | The God and The Queen | God | Short film | |
| 2017 | Sign Gene: The First Deaf Superheroes | Tom Clerc | Also executive producer, writer and director. | |
| 2021 | The Deaf Gamers | None | Director | |
| 2022 | The 355 | Giovanni Lupo | | |
| 2024 | Here After | None | Consultant | |
| 2026 | Feel My Voice | Alessandro Musso | | |
| 2026 | The Dog Stars | | In post-production | |

=== Television ===
| Year | Title | Role | Notes | Ref. |
|---|---|---|---|---|
| 2017 | Sky Sport | Himself | SKY | |
| 2018 | Rou Wo Ikiru Nanchou Wo Ikiru | Himself | NHK | |
| 2018–2023 | Striscia la notizia | Himself / Recurring guest | Mediaset | |
| 2022 | Limbo | None | TV series (Special thanks) | |

=== Music video ===
| Year | Title | Artist | Director | Notes | Ref. |
|---|---|---|---|---|---|
| 2014 | Santa Fe Flash | Maria Eva Albistur | | | |

== Advertising Campaigns ==
- Loro Piana LVMH (2024)
- Tod's (2025)

== Commercials ==
- Martini (2017)
- Green Energy Storage (2017)

== Accolades ==
Insolera is a Fulbright Scholar, having received one of the most prestigious educational exchange programs globally.

He graduated from University of Rome La Sapienza in Italy with 110 e Lode (summa cum laude), the highest academic distinction for top grades.

Insolera was named Alumni of the Month in 2019 by the US-Italy Fulbright Commission, in recognition of his contributions and impact within the Fulbright community.

Insolera's film Sign Gene: The First Deaf Superheroes was presented at the Italian Pavilion, Hôtel Barrière Le Majestic, during the 71st Cannes Film Festival.
