= Victorine Morriseau =

- Born: 1789; Saintes, Charente-Maritime, France
- Died: 1832 (aged 42–43)

Victorine Morriseau (1789 – 1832) is the first known deafblind person to be formally educated. Morriseau was born to an upper-class family in Saintes, Charente-Maritime in France in 1789.

Morriseau became deaf at a young age and gradually lost the ability to speak. Before completely losing the ability to hear and speak, she began to attend the Institut National de Jeunes Sourds de Paris, an institution for the deaf and dumb, where she lived until her death in 1832. She then became completely blind when she was twelve years old due to cataracts. Having already learned to communicate through signs before losing her sight, Morriseau was able to continue to communicate through tactile signing.

== Education ==
=== Background ===
Prior to Morriseau's education, many educators of deaf students, such as the founder and director of the Institut National de Jeunes Sourds de Paris, Charles-Michel de l'Épée and his successor Roch-Ambroise Cucurron Sicard, had theorized on the most effective techniques of teaching deafblind students. However, Morriseau was the first to be educated using these methods as the instructors had not encountered any deafblind people before her.

=== Process ===
Morriseau had started her education prior to completely losing her sight, but the event slowed her progression considerably. However, Morriseau's education was continued; her instructor, Abbot Périer, who was the successor of Sicard, communicated with her through tactile signing, and she was able to reply by writing on a blackboard. She was educated primarily in religious subjects for two years, at which point Périer considered her studies complete. Morriseau remained a devout Christian for the remainder of her life. Morriseau's education made France a pioneering country in the education of deafblind people and paved the way for the future education of this population.

== See also ==
- Ragnhild Kåta
- Laura Bridgman
- Helen Keller
- Julia Brace
