= Elias Hofgaard =

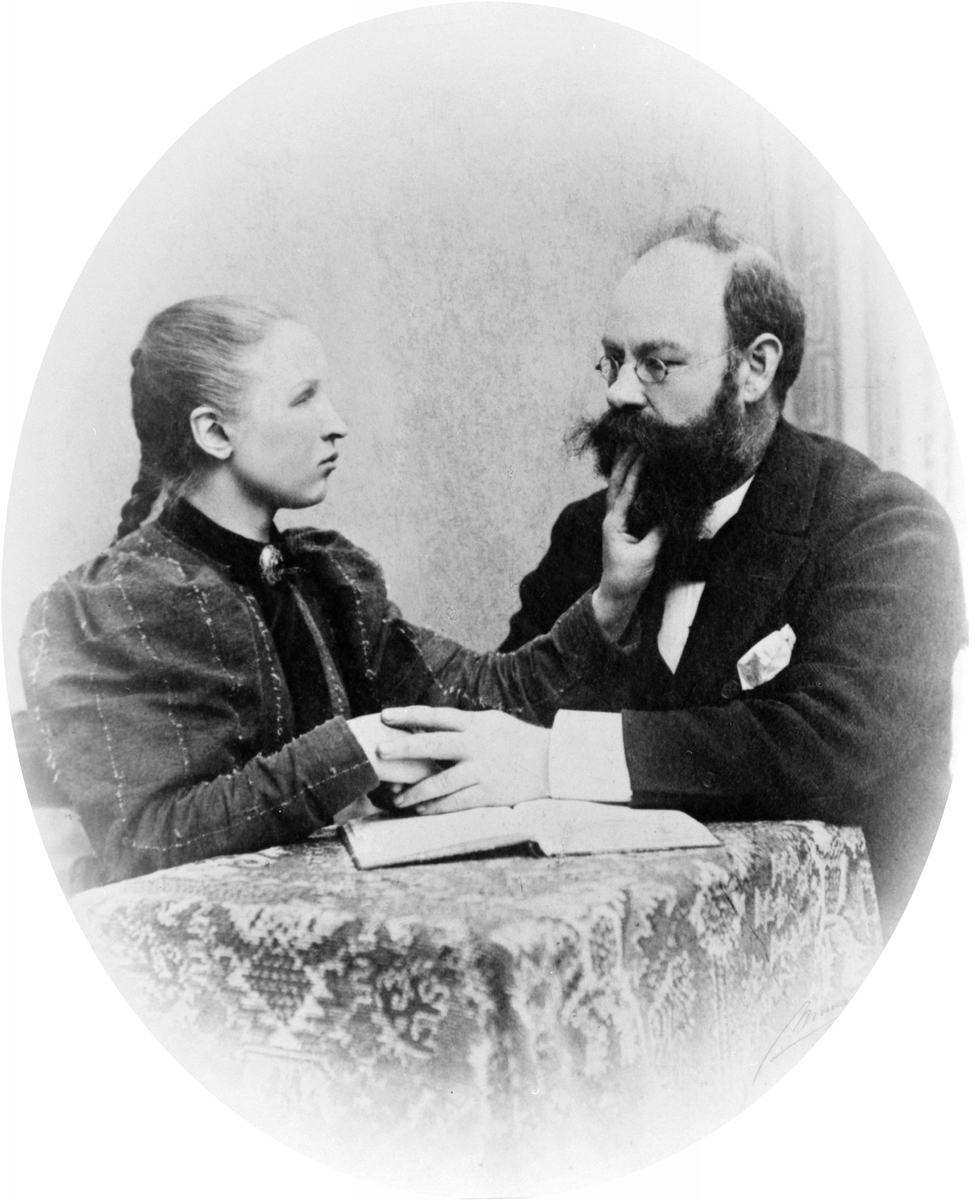
- Ragnhild Kåta with Elias Hofgaard
- Born: 25 November 1856; Berg, Østfold, Norway
- Died: 15 November 1906 (aged 49)
- Occupation: educator for deaf people
- Relatives: Lars Havstad (brother-in-law)

Elias Peter Hansen Hofgaard (né Hansen; 25 November 1856 – 15 November 1906) was a Norwegian pioneer educator of the deaf.

Hofgaard was born in Berg, Østfold, and was brother-in-law of Lars Havstad.

Hofgaard had employed the "speaking method" on very talented deaf students with good results; still it surprised many when he declared that he would use the method with the deafblind girl Ragnhild Tollefsdatter Kåta, probably among the first deafblind who learned to talk. Hofgaard reasoned that a deaf and blind child would have most use of learning to speak (rather than using e.g. the finger alphabet). Hofgaard first taught Kåta to pronounce the letters, then to combine two letters into a syllable, and finally multi-syllabic words before trying to attach meaning to what had, until then, been presented as a complicated game.

The first words used were: ur ('watch'), fot ('foot'), and bord ('table'). The words were associated with the objects over several days until Kåta understood that the words named the object. After that she learned to understand others by placing her hand on their lips as they spoke. She learned to write and to read Braille. During the summer of 1889, Kåta met with Mary Swift Lamson (1822–1909) who had taught Laura Bridgman at the Perkins School for the Blind. At that time, Mrs. Lamson reported that Kåta could already speak simple sentences. In 1890, ten-year-old Helen Keller was introduced to the story of Kåta and was inspired by her ability to learn to speak.

He died in a railway accident in Ljan in 1906.

He established Hamar Døvstummeinstitut in Hamar in 1882, and chaired the school for 25 years. He is particularly known for having educated Kåta.

== See also ==
- Andreas Christian Møller, founder of the school for the deaf in Trondheim
- Fredrik Glad Balchen, founder of the school for the deaf in Oslo
- Norwegian Sign Language
