= Ragnhild Kåta =

Norwegian deafblind girl who inspired Helen Keller

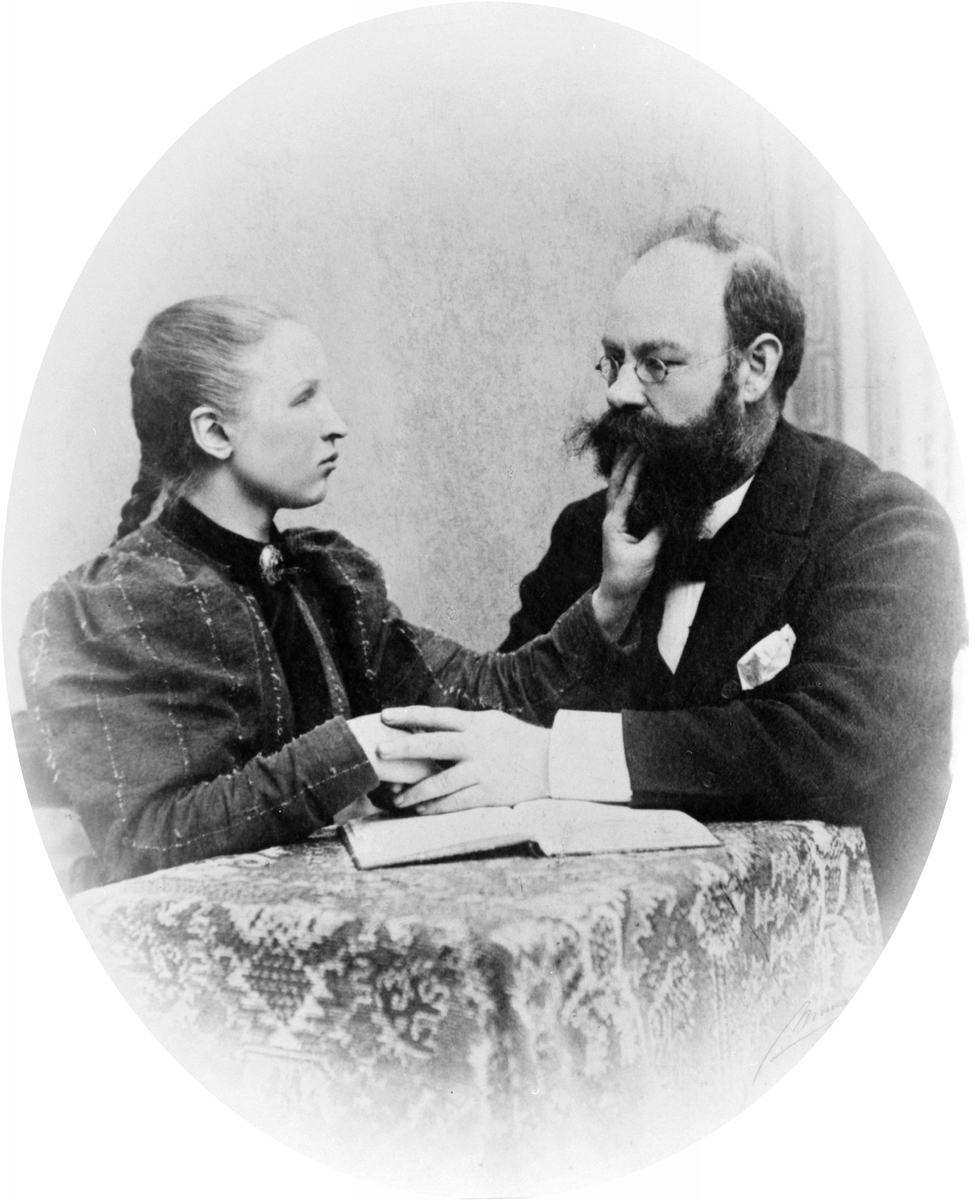
- Kåta with teacher Elias Hofgaard sometime before 1906
- Born: May 23, 1873; Kåtaeiet, Vestre Slidre, Oppland, Norway
- Died: February 12, 1947 (aged 73)
- Citizenship: Norwegian
- Known for: Being the first deafblind person in Norway who received proper schooling.

Ragnhild Tollefsdatter Kåta (23 May 1873 – 12 February 1947) was the first deafblind person in Norway who received proper schooling. Despite being deafblind, she learned to talk. The story of her success was an inspiration to Helen Keller.

== Early life ==
Ragnhild Kåta was born at Kåtaeiet in Vestre Slidre Municipality in Oppland county (now Innlandet), Norway. At the age of three and a half, she lost her sight, hearing, and sense of smell and taste, possibly due to scarlet fever.

Teacher and author Hallvard Bergh (1850–1922), after meeting Ragnhild in 1887, wrote a passionate piece about her tragic plight in Verdens Gang. The piece was read by Lars Havstad, himself deaf, a pioneer when it came to the education of the deaf in Norway. Havstad's brother-in-law, Elias Hofgaard, was the administrator of the Hamar Institute for the Deaf and Havstad wrote to Bergh suggesting he contact him.

Hofgaard agreed to accept Kåta as a student and the state agreed to pay for her. On 15 January 1888, Kåta was followed by her father to school for the first time. She was fourteen and it was a difficult transition. She was suspicious of all strangers and did not tolerate being touched. At times she bit, screamed, and clawed. Undeterred, Hofgaard finally managed to calm her down and she eventually trusted first him and then others to be around her.

Hofgaard had employed the "speaking method" on very talented deaf students with good results. It still surprised many when he declared that he would use the method with Kåta. Hofgaard reasoned that a deaf and blind child would have most use of learning to speak (rather than using e.g. the finger alphabet). Hofgaard first taught Kåta to pronounce the letters, then to combine two letters into a syllable, and finally multi-syllabic words before trying to attach meaning to what had, until then, been presented as a complicated game. The first words used were: ur ('watch'), fot ('foot'), and bord ('table'). The words were associated with the objects over several days until Kåta understood that the words named the object. After that, she learned to understand others by placing her hand on their lips as they spoke, she learned to write, and to read Braille. During the summer of 1889, Kåta met with Mary Swift Lamson (1822–1909) who had taught Laura Bridgman at the Perkins School for the Blind. At that time, Lamson reported that Kåta could already speak simple sentences. In 1890, ten-year-old Helen Keller was introduced to the story of Ragnhild Kåta and was inspired by her ability to learn to speak.

== Later life ==
Kåta became accomplished in embroidery as well as knitting and weaving. She received an honorable mention for a couple of pieces she sent to an exhibition in Skien in 1891, and later in life, she made enough money through her crafts to support herself. She went through confirmation in June 1897 which meant that she had to leave school. Her development stagnated, and Hofgaard managed to get permission for her to come back and live at the school for another couple of years. She is listed at the school in census data from 3 December 1900. When Kåta left school, her development was similar to a talented deaf (but seeing) person, something previously believed to be impossible.

Kåta's father died while she was at school. After she had left school, she went home to live with her mother. Hofgaard visited her regularly until a biking accident made travel impossible in 1904. Elias Hofgaard died in 1906. After her mother died, Kåta moved in with one of her sisters, and the last ten years of her life she lived at Døves Vel at Hamar. She died in February 1947 after a bout with bronchitis. She was described as almost always smiling and good-humored, talkative, and with an unshakable faith in God.

== See also ==
- Helen Keller
- Laura Bridgman
- Victorine Morriseau

== Other sources ==
- Hammer, Ragnvald (1954) Ragnhild Kåta: et sant eventyr (De døves blad)
