= Roch-Ambroise Auguste Bébian =

French sign language teacher (1789–1839)

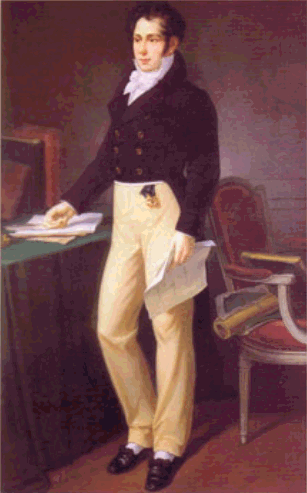
- Educator
- Born: 4 August 1789; Pointe-à-Pitre, Guadeloupe
- Died: 24 February 1839 (aged 49); Pointe-à-Pitre

Roch-Ambroise Auguste Bébian (French: [ʁɔk ɑ̃bʁwaz oɡyst bebjɑ̃]; 4 August 1789 – 24 February 1839) was one of the first hearing educators in France to achieve native-level fluency in French Sign Language. In 1825, he published an important book, Mimographie, which utilized a method of writing signs.

== Early life ==
Born on the Caribbean island of Guadeloupe, Bébian was sent to France by his father to obtain a high school education under the auspices of his godfather, the Abbé Roch-Ambroise Cucurron Sicard, who was the successor of the Abbé de l'Épée as the director of the Institution Nationale des Sourds-Muets de Paris. The Abbé Sicard sent Bébian to live with the Abbé Jauffret. He completed high school at the Lycée Charlemagne in Paris, where he was regarded as a brilliant student. Afterwards he dedicated himself to studying Deaf education.

== Career ==
Following the advice of Abbé Sicard, Bébian began working with three Deaf teachers—Jean Massieu, Ferdinand Berthier, and Laurent Clerc—at the Institution Nationale des Sourds-Muets de Paris. In 1817, he published the book Essai sur les sourds-muets et sur le langage naturel, which dealt with the educational philosophy and methods of the school, as well as the nature of French Sign Language.

Bébian turned down offers to become principal of schools for the Deaf in New York City and St. Petersburg, instead establishing a school on Montparnasse Boulevard in Paris. Later he became principal of a school in Rouen, then moved back to Guadeloupe, where he founded a school for Black students.

He won an award from the French Academy of Sciences for writing a eulogy for the Abbé de l'Épée titled "Éloge historique de l'abbé de l'Epée" (1819).

== Bibliography ==
Works by Bébian

- Bébian, Auguste. 1817. Essai sur les sourds-muets et sur le langage naturel, ou Introduction à une classification naturelle des idées avec leur signes propres. Paris: Dentu.
- Bébian, Auguste. 1819. Éloge de Charles-Michel de L'Épée, fondateur de l'Institution des Sourds-Muets: discours qui a obtenu le prix proposé par la Société Royale Académique des Sciences....
- Bébian, Auguste. 1825. Mimographie: ou, Essai d'écriture mimique, propre à régulariser le langage des sourds-muets. Paris: L. Colas
- Bébian, Auguste. 1826–1827. Journal de l'instruction des sourds-muets et des aveugles, rédigé par M. Bébian. Volume 1 (1826) 374 pages. Volume 2 (1827) 168 pages. Paris: Institution Spéciale des Sourds-Muets.
- Bébian, Auguste. Suite de l'examen des diverses méthodes employées pour l'instruction des sourds-muets; école de l'Abbé Sicard. Journal de l'instruction des sourds-muets et des aveugles, 1826, 1, 320–335; 2, 22–53.
- Bébian, Auguste. Notice sur l'Institution Impériale des Sourds-Muets de Saint-Petersbourg. Journal de l'instruction des sourds-muets et des aveugles, 1826, 1, 91–95.
- Bébian, Auguste. Instruction des sourds-muets aux Etats-Unis. Journal de l'instruction des sourds-muets et des aveugles, 1826, 1, 356–364.
- Bébian, Auguste. Sourd-Muet accusé de rébellion et de violence contre les agents de l'autorité. Journal de l'instruction des sourds-muets et des aveugles, 1826, 1, 39–42.
- Bébian, Auguste. Cours d'assises de Paris, audience du 6 juillet 1826; vol commis par un sourd-muet. Journal de l'instruction des sourds-muets et des aveugles, 1826, 1, 42–46.
- Bébian, Auguste. 1827. Manuel d'enseignement pratique des sourds-muets (Volumes 1 and 2). Paris: Méquignon l'Ainé. Download volume 1: https://archive.org/details/gu_manueldenseig01bebi/page/n6/mode/2up. Download volume 2: https://archive.org/details/gu_manueldenseig02bebi/page/n4/mode/2up
- Bébian, Auguste. Affaire du sourd-muet Filleron. Cours d'Assises de la Seine, séance du août, 1827. Journal de l'instruction des sourds-muets et des aveugles, 1827, 2, 53–84.
- Bébian, Auguste. Affaire du sourd-muet Sauron. Journal de l'instruction des sourds-muets et des aveugles, 1827, 70–79.
- Bébian, Auguste. Opérations intellectuelles du sourd-muet. Journal de l'instruction publiqué, 1828, 70–79.
- Bébian, Auguste. 1828. Lecture instantanée. Nouvelle méthode pour apprendre à lire sans épeler. Paris: Crapelet
- Bébian, Auguste. 1831. Éducation des sourds-muets mise a la portée des instituteurs primaires et de tous les parents: cours d'instruction élémentaire dans une suite d'exercises gradués, expliqués par des figures. Principes.. Paris: Impr. de Béthune.
- Bébian, Auguste. 1834. Examen critique de la nouvelle organisation de l'enseignement dans l'Institution Royale des Sourds-Muets de Paris. Paris: Treuttel et Wurtz, Hachette
- (Books uploaded to Archive.org) Archival books

Preface by Bébian

- L'Épée, Charles-Michel de, M. l'abbe Sicard. 1820. L'art d'enseigner a parler aux sourdsmuets de naissance; augm. de notes explicatives et d'un avant-propos. Paris: Dentu. Preface by Bébian titled: "Éloge historique de l'abbé de l'Epée"

Works about Bébian

- Bernard, Yves. 1992. La Mimographie de Bébian (1789–1839) - Le signe est l'ombre de l'idée. In: La Caravelle, Volume 118 (1992), pp. 15–17. Also in: Liaisons: Bulletin du Centre National de Formation des Enseignants Intervenants auprès des Jeunes Sourds (CNFEJS), Volume 7, December 1995, pp. 34–64
- Berthier, Ferdinand. 1839. Notice sur la vie et les ouvrages de August Bébian ancien censeur des études de l'Institute Royal des Sourds-Muets de Paris. Paris: Chez J. Ledoyen
- Berthier, Ferdinand. 1911. Biographie de Bébian, published in serial in Le Colonial (a journal published in Guadeloupe) on May 17, 24 and 31 and June 14, 1911.
- Berthier, Ferdinand. 2009. Forging Deaf Education in Nineteenth-Century France: Biographical Sketches of Bébian, Sicard, Massieu, and Clerc. Edited and Translated by Freeman G. Henry. Washington, DC: Gallaudet University Press
- Buisson, Ferdinand Edouard (editor). 1887. Dictionnaire de pédagogie et d'instruction primaire de Ferdinand Buisson, Tome I, 1ère partie, p. 179. Download text of article: (French)
- Fischer, Renate. 1995. The notation of sign languages: Bébian's Mimographie. In: Bos, Heleen F. and Gertrude M. Schermer (eds): Sign Language Research 1994: Proceedings of the Fourth European Congress on Sign Language Research, Munich, September 1-3, 1994. (International Studies on Sign Language and Communication of the Deaf; 29) Hamburg : Signum, pp. 285–302
- Forestier, Claudius. 1883. Parallèle entre l'instruction des sourds-muets par la langage des signes et leur einseignement par l'articulation artificielle: suivi de quelques observations sur la méthode du célèbre Pereire et sur les résolutions qu'a votées contre l'enseignement par le langage des signes; le Congrès International tenu à Milan du 6 au 12 Septembre 1880 pour l'amélioration du sort des sourds-muets. Lyon: impr. Pitrat aîné
- Renard, Marc. 2004. Ecrire les signes: La mimographie d'Auguste Bébian et les notations contemporaines . París: Éditions du Fox

Other works which contain information about Bébian

- Bézagu-Deluy, Maryse. 1990. L'abbé de L'Epée: instituteur gratuit des sourds et muets: 1712-1789. Paris: Seghers
- Cuxac, Christian. 1983. Le langage des sourds. Paris: Payo
- Lane, Harlan. 1984. When the Mind Hears. Random House
