= Ferdinand Berthier =

French deaf educator (1803–1886)

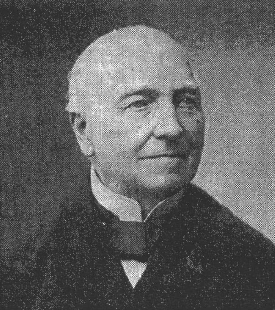
- Born: September 30, 1803; Louhans, Saône-et-Loire, France
- Died: July 12, 1886 (aged 82); Paris, France
- Education: Institut National de Jeunes Sourds de Paris
- Occupations: Educator; Intellectual; Political organiser
- Known for: Deaf rights movement
- Honours: Chevalier de la Légion d'honneur

Ferdinand Berthier (French: [fɛʁdinɑ̃ bɛʁtje]; 30 September 1803 – 12 July 1886) was a French deaf educator, intellectual and political organiser in nineteenth-century France. He was one of the earliest champions of deaf identity and culture.

== Early life ==
Born in 1803 in the town of Louhans, Saône-et-Loire, France, Berthier first attended the Institut National de Jeunes Sourds de Paris as a young student in 1811, when the school was under the directorship of Abbé Roch-Ambroise Sicard. He came from the rural south-east of France to learn basic vocational skills and literacy to prepare him for work as a tradesman.

He was influenced by his teacher Roch-Ambroise Auguste Bébian, a hearing man who had learned French Sign Language and published the first systematic study and defense of the language. Berthier was also influenced by two important deaf students of the school who later became teachers: Jean Massieu and Laurent Clerc. By the age of 27, Berthier had become one of the more senior professors at the school.

== Deaf community work ==
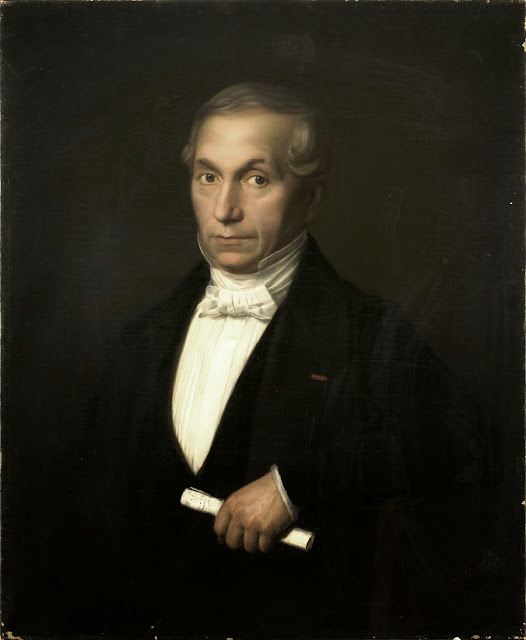
Portrait, painted in 1853 by Cyprien Briot.

In late 1837, Berthier petitioned the French government for permission to create the Société Centrale des Sourds-muets (the Central Society for Deaf-mutes), which was officially founded the following year. The organisation aimed to bring together "all the deaf spread across the globe... to put speaking and deaf men of intelligence and heart in rapport with each other, no matter the distance, no matter the difference in language, culture and laws."

Berthier's organisation offered deaf workers a practical avenue to support each other through "mutual aid" and a way to organize and attend adult education classes. Berthier performed a delicate balancing act as a passionate defender of deaf identity and sign language under a repressive social and political climate. He also wrote books about deaf history and deaf culture, noting deaf artists and sign-language poets of his time.

In 1850, Berthier created the Central Society for the Education and Assistance of the Deaf which wished to recruit affluent hearing benefactors in order to support deaf people. By the 1860s, the members were no longer those closely to Berthier and his principles, but government officials, doctors and merchants. In 1860, Léon Vaïsse, director of Institut National de Jeunes Sourds de Paris, was the society's secretary. At this time, both the wives of Émile and Isaac Pereire (grandsons of Jacob Rodrigues Pereira) were on the board.

== Death and legacy ==
In 1849, he became the first deaf person to receive the Chevalier de la Légion d'honneur, the highest French order of merit. Berthier died on 13 July 1886 in Paris at the age of 82. On September 30, 2023, a Google Doodle was dedicated to his legacy.

== Published works ==
- L'Abbé Sicard... précis historique sur sa vie, ses travaux et ses succès... (Paris: Charles Dounoil, 1873)
- Histoire et statistique de l’éducation des sourds-muets (Paris: chez l’auteur, 1836)
- Notice sur la vie et les ouvrages d’Auguste Bébian (Paris: J. Ledoyen, 1839)

== See also ==
- Roch-Ambroise Auguste Bébian
- Ludwig van Beethoven

== Sources ==
- Moody, William (1987). "Berthier, Jean-Ferdinand (1803–1886)". In Van Cleve, John Vickrey (ed.). Gallaudet Encyclopedia of Deaf People and Deafness. Vol. 1. New York: McGraw-Hill Book Company. pp. 141–143. ISBN 9780070792296. OCLC 13821696.
- Quartararo, Anne T. (Winter 2002). "The Life and Times of the French Deaf Leader, Ferdinand Berthier: An Analysis of His Early Career". Sign Language Studies. 2 (2): 182–196. JSTOR 26204797.
