= Andreas Christian Møller =

Norwegian teacher of the Deaf (1796–1874)

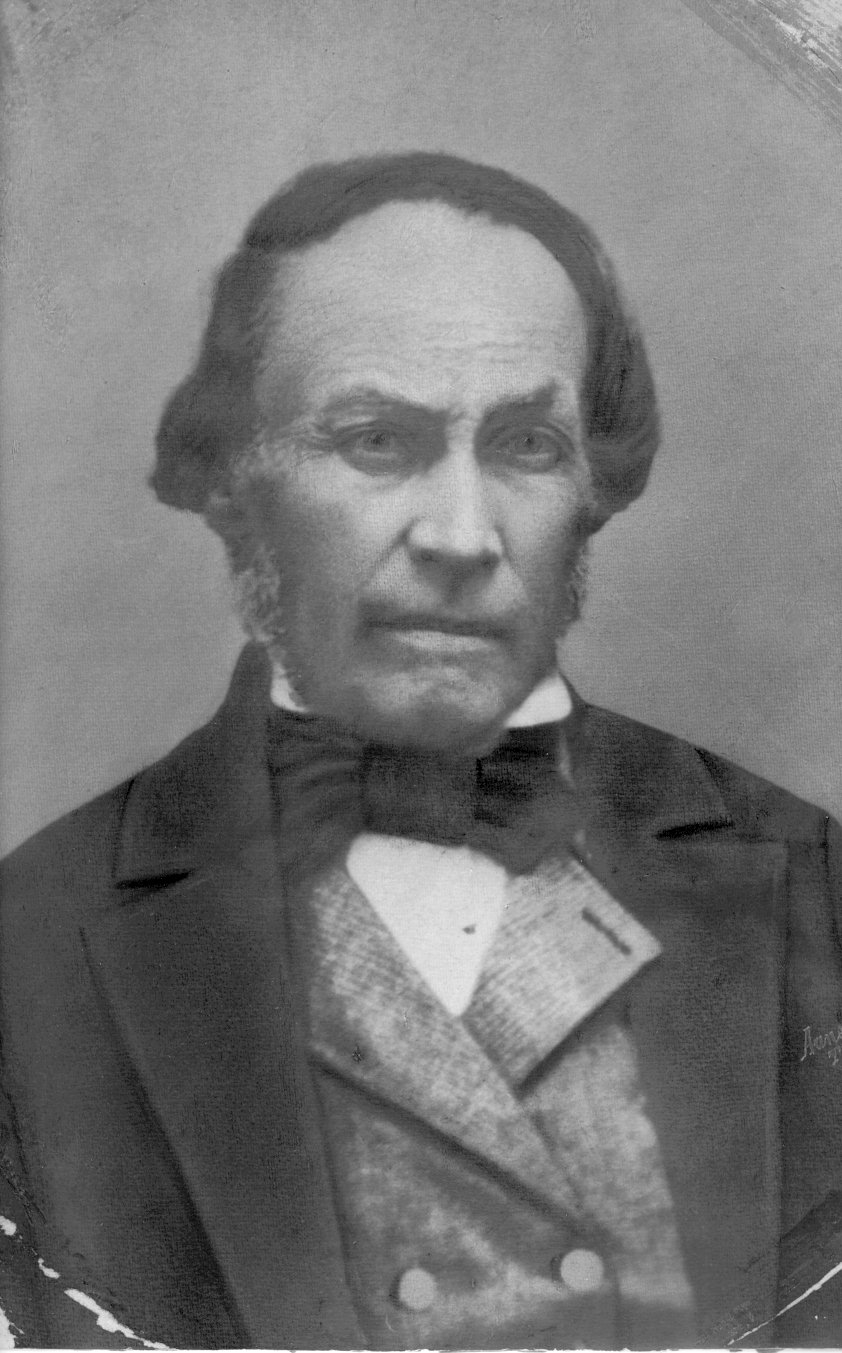
- Møller ca. 1860.
- Born: 18 February 1796; Trondheim, Norway
- Died: 24 December 1874 (aged 78); Trondheim, Norway
- Known for: Founding Norway's first school for the Deaf
- Spouse: Birgitte Marie Holst (m. 1826)
- Children: 9

Andreas Christian Møller (18 February 1796 – 24 December 1874) was a Norwegian lathe operator and teacher of the Deaf who founded the first school for the Deaf in Norway. Møller is therefore considered the "father of Deaf education" in Norway. The AC Møller Sign Language Center bears his name.

== Biography ==
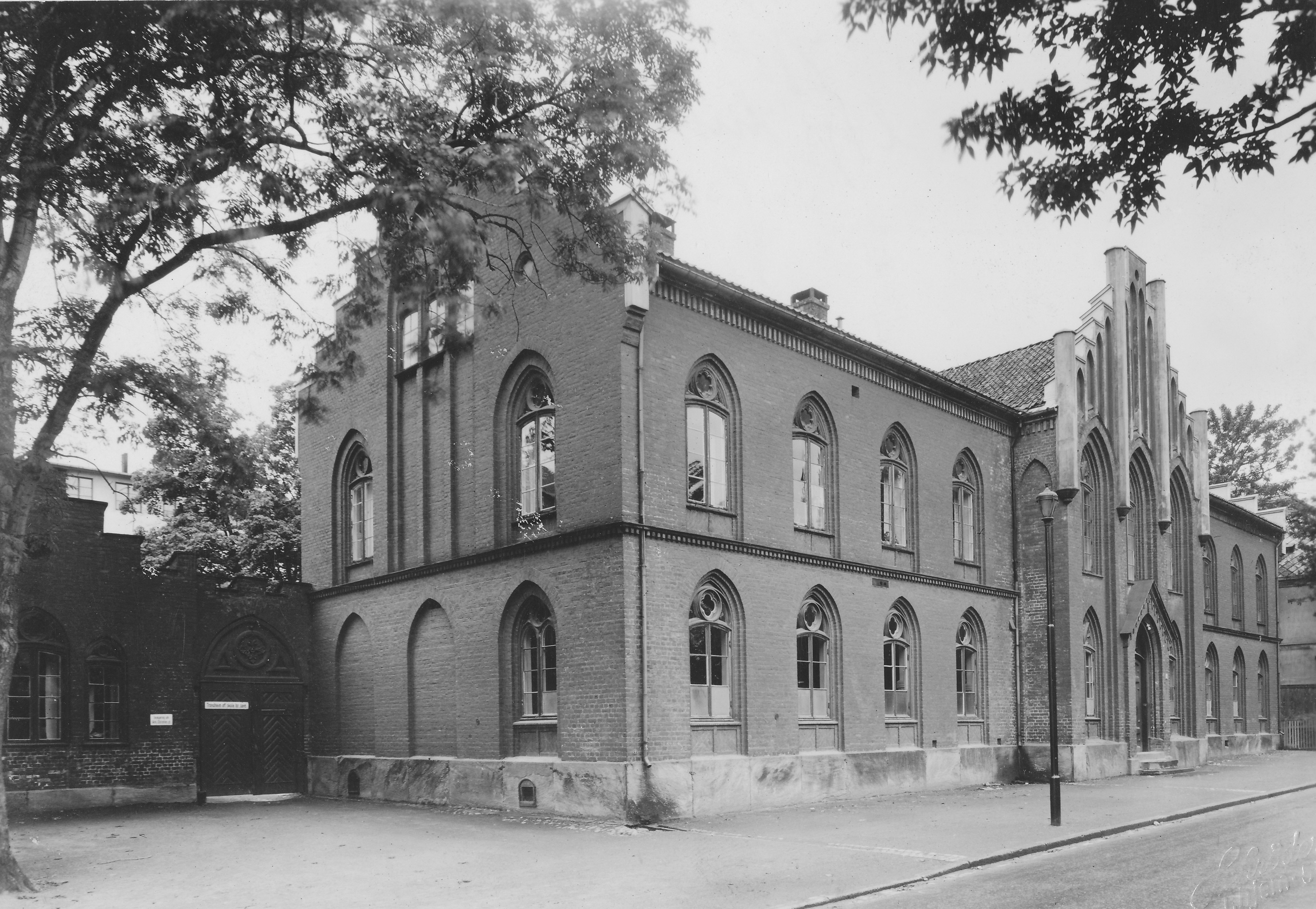
Trondheim Deaf-Mute Institute (Trondhjems Døvstummeinstitut) at Bispegata 9B, Trondheim, Norway.

Møller was born in Trondheim, Norway, as the third of eight children to master shoemaker Johannes Møller and wife Ingeborg Christiansdatter Steen.

=== Education ===
Møller became deaf at two years of age as the result of smallpox. Attempts were made to restore his hearing through electric shock, which were unsuccessful. His education suffered during his upbringing due to his disability as there were no schools for the Deaf available nearby where he could be educated. The closest school for the Deaf was located in Copenhagen, Denmark and called Det Kongelige Døvstummeinstitut, the Royal Institute for the Deaf-Mute. Students were educated using the "French method" of Charles-Michel de l'Épée with sign language and written language; it was through sign language that they would learn Danish. Through financial support from the county's Department for the Poor in Trondheim, Møller began his studies at the school in 1810 at 14 years old. He did exceptionally well in several subjects and in 1815 began to learn woodworking on the lathe; that year he was put to work as "teacher and répétiteur for the oldest class of students" by the head of the school, Norwegian-born doctor and professor Peter Atke Castberg.

=== Teaching ===
From 1815 to 1817 Møller primarily resided in Trondheim, where he taught Deaf students from his father's home. When a position became available at the school in Copenhagen in 1817, a messenger was sent for Møller. He was encouraged to apply for the position, which he received. From 1817 to 1822 he worked as a teacher at the school; he was the first deaf teacher of the deaf in the Nordic countries.

Castberg encouraged Norwegian authorities to open a school for the Deaf in Trondheim with Møller as teacher. He also offered his advice and guidance. The suggestion was well-received, and the Bishop of Nidaros, Peder Olivarius Bugge, forwarded it to the Ministry of Church Affairs, at the time responsible for education, with his recommendation. The first school for the Deaf in Norway – and the first Norwegian school for special education – was founded by royal resolution on 1 November 1824. The school was given the name Throndhjems Døvstummeinstitut ('Trondheim Deaf-Mute Institute', today Huseby barneskole – AC Møller tegnspråksenter 'Huseby Primary School – AC Møller Sign Language Center'), and opened on 1 April 1825. It was the only such school in the country until the mid-1800s. For many years, the school operated as a family business. Møller worked as a teacher, his father Johannes Møller as accountant, and Møller's brother Petter Christian Møller as a teacher. Several other family members would later work at the school. The school also employed two Deaf teachers, Pehr Pehrson and Johan Julius Dircks.

Initially, the school was located in Waisenhuset, an orphanage near Nidaros Cathedral. Møller taught according to the French method, with emphasis on sign language. In the late 1830s the school underwent a shift after Møller's father and brother were dismissed – a former student who had worked for Johannes Møller had given birth and named "Hans" as the father; Petter Christian later came forth as the father and admitted he had long had improper conduct towards several students. In addition to the change in staff, there was a change in the school's pedagogical methods. The school moved away from the French method in favor of the German method, with a much greater emphasis on speech and lip reading (see Oralism). Despite the change, Møller remained with the school until 1855. His teaching position was then taken over by Pehrson.

Møller died of old age and bronchitis on 24 December 1874 in Trondheim.

== Family ==
Møller married Birgitte Marie Holst, daughter of Jens Hybe Holst and Vibeke Cathrine Berg, in Nidaros Cathedral on 26 April 1826. The couple had nine children, Julius Joakim (1827), Jens Hybe (1829), Anna Elisabeth Holst (1830), Amalie Marie (1832), Samuline Steeman (1834), Paul Moth Wildenrath (1837), Vibekke Katrine and Caroline Mathilde (1839), and Vilma Dapaula Scharadella (1843).

== See also ==
- Elias Hofgaard, founder of the school for the deaf in Hamar
- Fredrik Glad Balchen, founder of the school for the deaf in Oslo
- Norwegian Sign Language
