= Julia Brace =

American deafblind woman (1807-84)

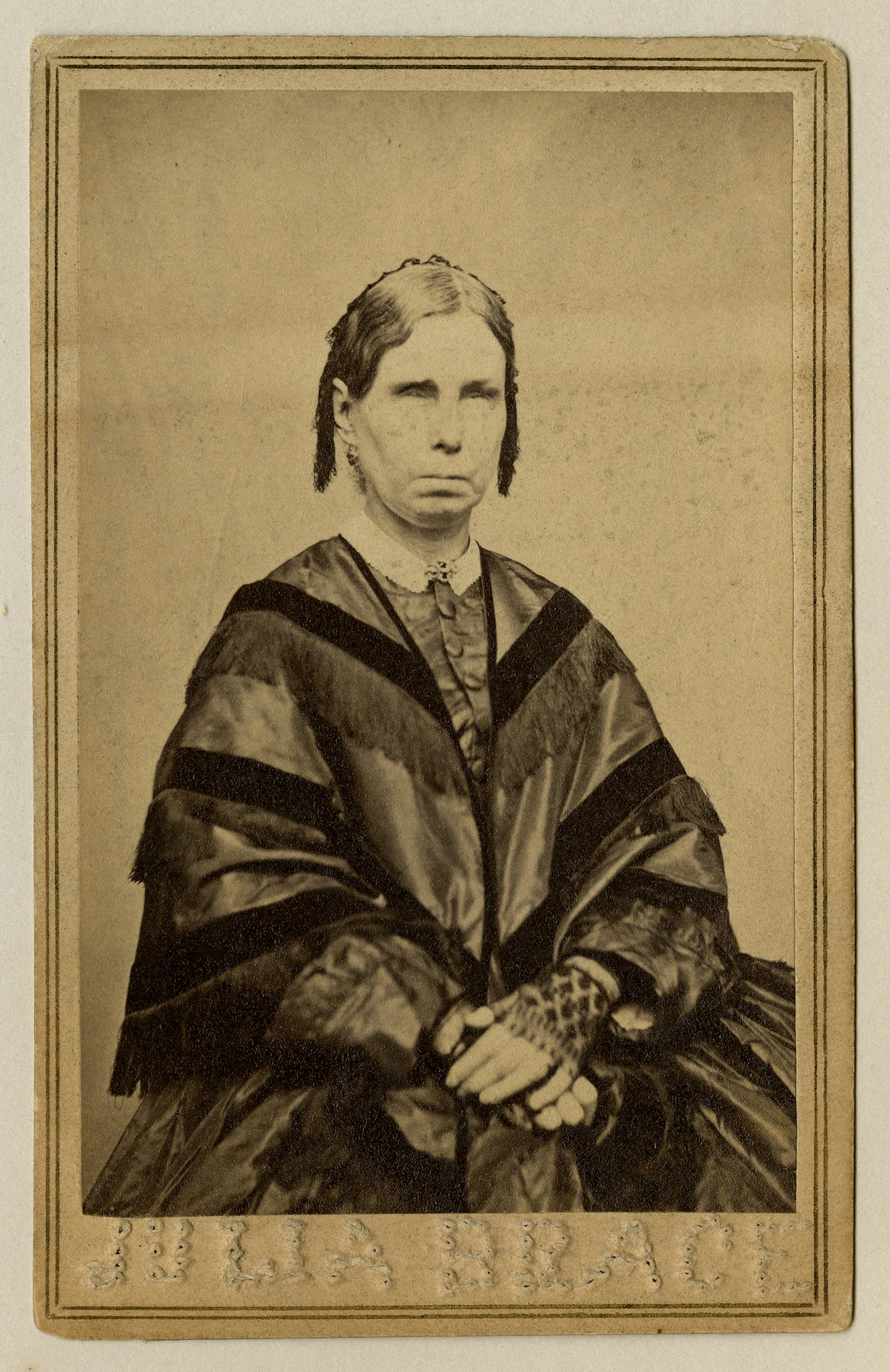
- Born: June 13, 1807; Newington
- Died: August 12, 1884
- Education: American School for the Deaf

Julia Brace (June 13, 1807 – August 12, 1884) was a deafblind woman who enrolled at the American School for the Deaf, in Hartford, Connecticut, in 1825 and remained there as an employee after her graduation.

== Biography ==
Julia Brace was born to a poor family in Hartford County, Connecticut, on June 13, 1807, and became deaf-blind at age five from typhus fever. She gradually stopped speaking and developed a system of home sign that she used with her parents. She was sent to a boarding school with hearing and sighted children before being offered a place at the Hartford Asylum for the Deaf and Dumb (now called the American School for the Deaf), where she enrolled on June 11, 1825, two days before her 18th birthday.

During her childhood, she was described as independent, inquisitive, and feisty. Although she was not given much formal instruction, she did acquire tactile signing from the resident deaf students and staff at the Hartford school. Despite being the only blind person there, she became a part of the school community, forming friendships (and enemies), fulfilling communal duties, and developing skills in sewing and knitting. She began to be seen as something of a celebrity and received many curious visitors — although these regular interruptions to her daily activities apparently annoyed her and she was not afraid, on occasion, to make her displeasure known.

She was protective of her own rights, and never intentionally invaded those of others, and she was never known to deceive. She was kind and gentle enough to be entrusted with the care of the sick, and made an excellent nurse.

Samuel Gridley Howe, an educator from the Perkins School for the Blind, began instructing the seven-year-old deaf-blind Laura Bridgman after meeting Brace during a visit to the Hartford school around 1837. After four years and much success with his young pupil, Howe returned to Hartford in 1841, bringing Bridgman with him. Although Brace was 34 years old, Howe thought he would also like to attempt to instruct her in the English language as he had Bridgman. On April 6, 1842, Brace enrolled as a student of the Perkins School.

Martha Johonnet left Brace $200 (equivalent to $6,450 in 2025) annually in her will.

Howe's "experiment", however, proved less successful than he had hoped, as Brace clearly preferred to communicate in sign language, and she returned to the Hartford school after a year, where she continued to board until 1860.

She left the school to take up residence with her sister in Bloomfield, Connecticut, where she died on August 12, 1884, aged 77. She was buried in an unmarked grave in the West Hill Cemetery.
