= Kåta =

Kåta may refer to:

- Kåta (dwelling), Swedish name of Lavvu, dwellings used by the Sami people
- Ragnhild Kåta (1873–1947), the first deafblind person in Norway who received proper schooling
