= Balchen (disambiguation) =

Balchen may refer to:

== Surname ==
- Bernt Balchen (1899–1973), a pioneer polar aviator, navigator, aircraft mechanical engineer and military leader
- Fredrik Glad Balchen (1815–1899), a Norwegian deaf teacher
- Jens Glad Balchen (1926–2009), a Norwegian engineer
- John Balchen (1670–1744), an Admiral of the British Royal Navy

== Toponym ==
- Balchen Glacier in Antarctica
- Balchen Mountain in Antarctica (72°0′S, 27°12′E)
- Mount Balchen, a mountain in Antarctica (85°22′S, 166°12′W)
- Mount Balchen (Alaska), a mountain in the US
