= Peter Atke Castberg =

Danish professor (1779–1823)

- Born: 3 August 1779; Copenhagen, Denmark
- Died: 30 April 1823 (aged 43); Copenhagen, Denmark
- Burial place: Assistens Cemetery, Copenhagen
- Occupation: Professor
- Known for: Founding modern deaf education in Denmark

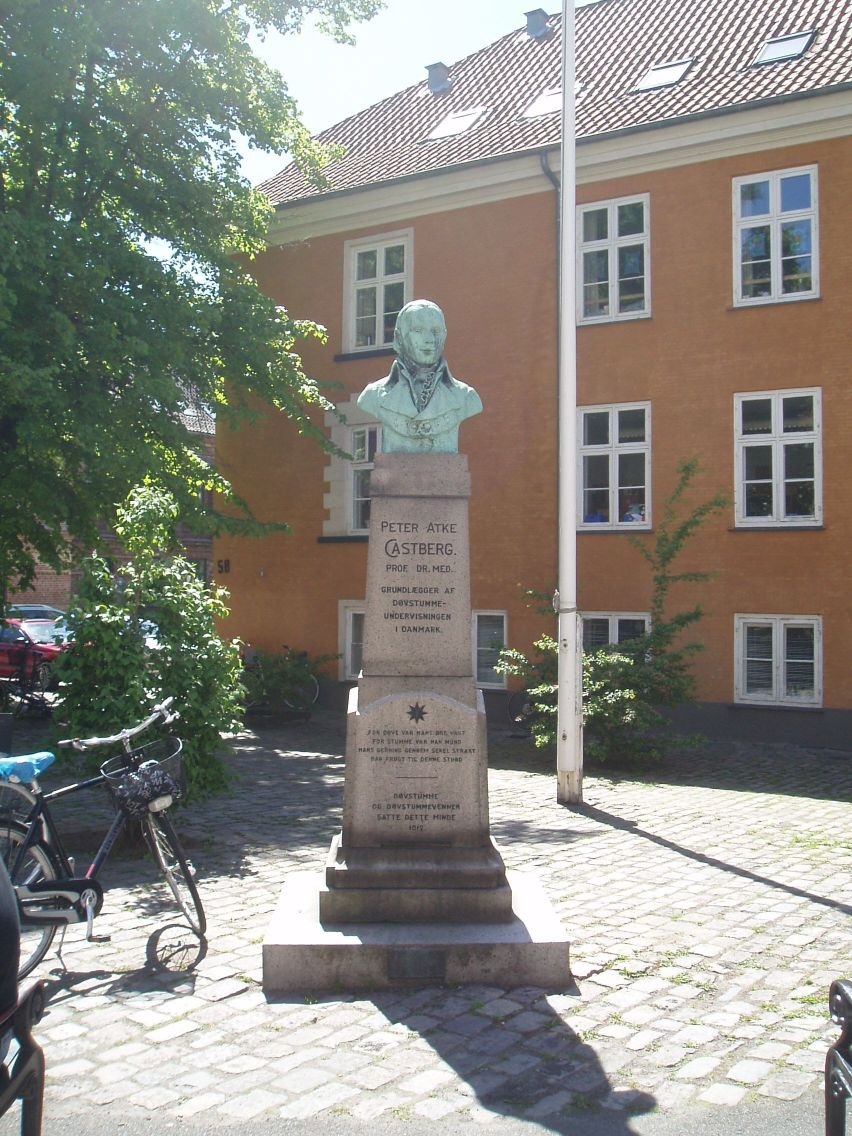
Bust of Peter Atke Castberg

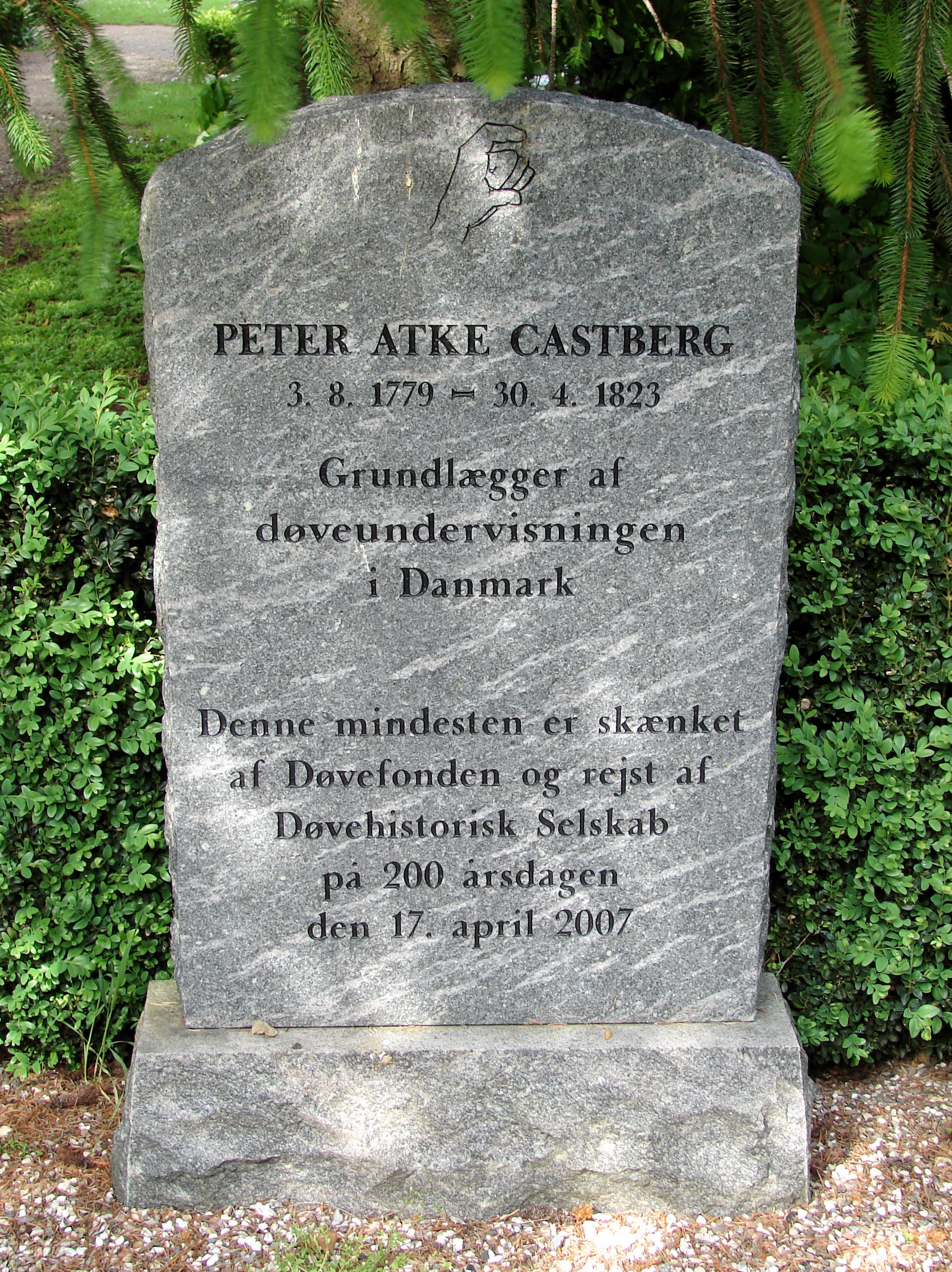
Memorial of Peter Atke Castberg

Peter Atke Castberg (3 August 1779 – 30 April 1823) was a Danish professor and medical doctor who founded modern deaf education in Denmark.

== Biography ==
Castberg was born in Copenhagen, Denmark, to Peder Leganger Castberg, a priest, and Magdalene Sophie Bentzen, and was educated in Kongsberg until enrolling in university. He studied medicine at the University of Copenhagen and took the public service exam in 1801. He began his practice at Frederiks Hospital and received his doctorate in medicine in 1802. During his studies and work as a doctor, Castberg found an interest in helping the deaf. He initially attempted to cure them through galvanism, the use of electric current.

From 1803 to 1805 he undertook an educational trip to visit deaf schools including Georg Wilhelm Pfingsten's school in Kiel, Charles-Michel de l'Épée's school in Paris, and Samuel Heinicke's school. After his return, Castberg sent a report to the government to draw attention to the need to establish an education establishment for the deaf. In the meantime, he began privately tutoring deaf students, choosing the French method of instruction, which emphasized the use of sign language. The relevant law was enacted by Christian IX on 17 April 1807, and the education of 10 students thus officially began at Det Kongelige Døvstumme-Institut i Kjøbenhavn ('the Royal Institute for the Deaf-Mute in Copenhagen'). Castberg was the school's head and head teacher.

Castberg encouraged Norwegian Andreas Christian Møller – who had studied at the institute from 1810 to 1815 as there were no schools for the deaf in Norway – to work there as a teacher, which he did from 1817 to 1822, becoming the first deaf teacher of the deaf in the Nordic countries. Castberg would later influence the founding of the first deaf school in Norway. He encouraged Norwegian authorities of the need for education for the deaf; the first Norwegian school for the deaf – and Norwegian special education school in general – was founded in 1824 with Møller as its head.

According to the law of 11 April 1817, all deaf children in Denmark were to receive an education at the institute, which led to cramped conditions. Additionally, the Danish state bankruptcy of 1813 led to increasing financial difficulties. This resulted in the institute being placed under management in 1823.

Castberg was made a Knight of the Order of the Dannebrog.

Castberg died in Copenhagen in 1823 and is buried at Assistens Cemetery there.

== Memorials ==
A bust of Peter Atke Castberg is located at Skolen på Kastelsvej, a school for deaf and hard-of-hearing children.

The street Castbergsvej in Valby, Copenhagen, is named after Castberg.

== Castberg Prize ==
Døvefonden, the Danish Deaf Foundation, has since 1970 awarded the Castberg Prize to individuals who further the cause of the deaf. Winners include teacher Lars-Åke Wikström (1979) and linguist Elisabeth Engberg-Pedersen (1994).
