= Laura Bridgman =

American deaf-blind woman (1829–1889)

Laura Dewey Lynn Bridgman
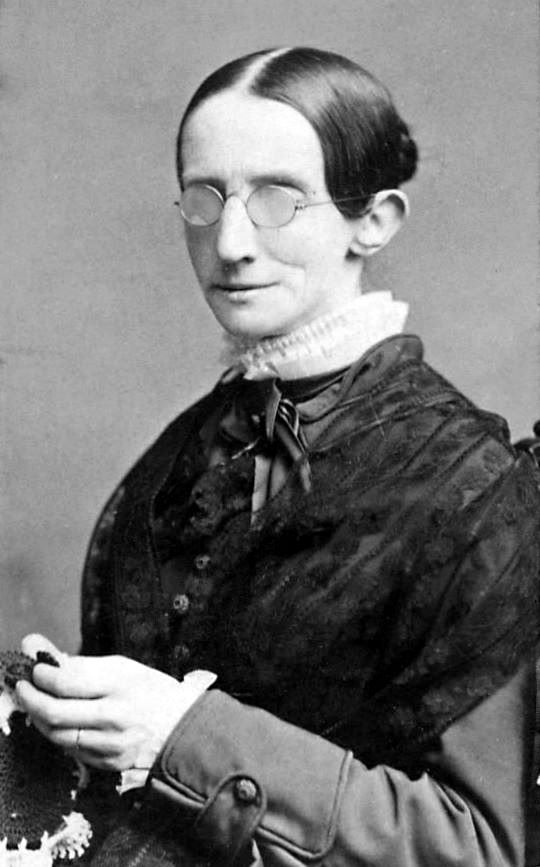
- Born: December 21, 1829; Hanover, New Hampshire, US
- Died: May 24, 1889 (aged 59); Boston, Massachusetts, US
- Resting place: Dana Cemetery, Hanover, New Hampshire
- Education: Perkins School for the Blind

Laura Dewey Lynn Bridgman (December 21, 1829 – May 24, 1889) was the first deaf-blind American child to gain a significant education in the English language, forty-five years before the more famous Helen Keller; Bridgman's friend Anne Sullivan became Helen Keller's aide. (Note: However, there are accounts of deaf-blind people communicating in tactile sign language before this time, as deaf-blind Victorine Morriseau (1789–1832) had successfully learned French as a child some years earlier.) Bridgman was left deaf-blind at the age of two after contracting an unusually severe case of scarlet fever. She was educated at the Perkins Institution for the Blind where, under the direction of Samuel Gridley Howe, she learned to read and communicate using Braille and the manual alphabet developed by Charles-Michel de l'Épée.

For several years, Bridgman gained celebrity status when Charles Dickens met her during his 1842 American tour and wrote about her accomplishments in his American Notes. Her fame was short-lived, however, and she spent the remainder of her life in relative obscurity, most of it at the Perkins Institute, where she passed her time sewing and reading books in Braille.

== Early years ==
Bridgman was born in Hanover, New Hampshire. She was the third daughter of Daniel Bridgman, a Baptist farmer, and his wife Harmony (daughter of Cushman Downer, and granddaughter of Joseph Downer), one of the five first settlers (1761) of Thetford, Vermont. Laura was a delicate infant, small and rickety, who often had convulsions until she was eighteen months old. Her family was struck with scarlet fever when Laura was two years old. The illness killed her two older sisters and left her deaf, blind, and without senses of smell or taste. Though she gradually recovered her health, she remained deaf and blind. Laura's mother kept her well-groomed and showed the child affection, but Laura received little attention from the rest of her family, including her father, who, on occasion, tried to "frighten her into obedience" by stamping his foot hard on the floor to startle her with the vibrations. Her closest friend was a kind, mentally impaired hired man of the Bridgmans, Asa Tenney, whom she credited with making her childhood happy. Tenney had some kind of expressive language disorder himself, and communicated with Laura in signs. He knew Native Americans who used a sign language (probably Abenaki using Plains Indian Sign Language), and had begun to teach Laura to express herself using these signs when she was sent away to school.

== Education at the Perkins School ==
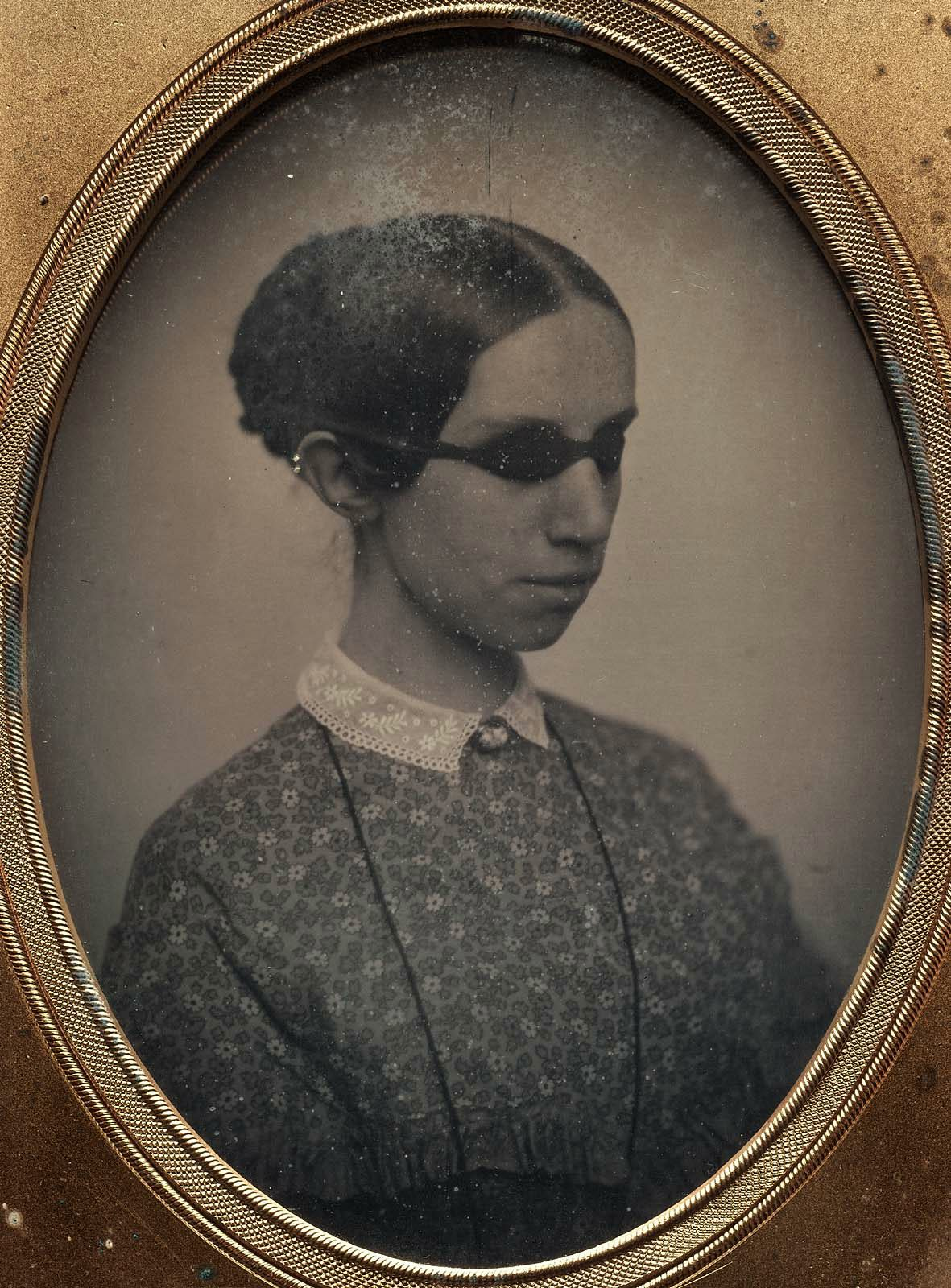
Bridgman circa 1855. Daguerreotype by Southworth & Hawes

In 1837, James Barrett of Dartmouth College saw Bridgman and mentioned her case to Dr. Reuben Mussey, the head of the medical department. Mussey visited the Bridgman home and found Laura an affectionate and intelligent girl who, despite her severe disabilities, could perform basic household tasks such as sewing and setting the table. Mussey sent an account to Dr. Samuel Gridley Howe, the director of the Perkins Institution for the Blind in Boston, who was eager to educate the young Bridgman. Bridgman entered the school on October 12, 1837, two months before her eighth birthday. Bridgman was frightened and homesick at first, but she soon formed an attachment to the house matron, Miss Lydia Hall Drew (1815-1887), who was also her first instructor at the school.

Howe had recently met Julia Brace, a deaf-blind resident at the American School for the Deaf who communicated by using a series of primitive signs; however, her instructors had failed to teach her more advanced methods of communication, such as adapted forms of tactile sign. Howe developed a plan to teach Bridgman to read and write through tactile means — something that had not been attempted previously, to his knowledge. Howe's plan was based on the theories of the French philosopher Denis Diderot, who believed the sense of touch could develop its "own medium of symbolic language." At first he and his assistant, Lydia Hall Drew, used words printed with raised letters, and later they progressed to using a manual alphabet expressed through mapping the English alphabet on to points and tracing motions on the palm of the hand. Eventually she received a broad education.

Howe taught Bridgman words before the individual letters. His first experiment consisted of pasting paper labels upon several common articles such as keys, spoons, and knives, with the names of the articles printed in raised letters. He then had her feel the labels by themselves, and she learned to associate the raised letters with the articles to which they referred. Eventually, she could find the right label for each object from a mixed heap. The next stage was to give her the individual letters and teach her to combine them to spell the words she knew. Gradually, in this way, she learned the alphabet and the ten digits. Her own interest in learning became keener as she progressed in her studies.

Howe devoted himself to Bridgman's education and was rewarded with increasing success. On July 24, 1839, she first wrote her own name legibly. On June 20, 1840, she had her first arithmetic lesson, with the aid of a metallic case perforated with square holes, square types being used; and in nineteen days she could add a column of figures amounting to thirty. She was in good health and happy, and was treated as a daughter by Howe. She lived in the director's apartment with Howe and his sister, Jeannette Howe, until Howe married Julia Ward in 1843. Her case had already begun to interest the public, and others were brought to Dr. Howe for treatment.

== Fame ==
From the beginning of his work with Bridgman, Howe sent accounts of her progress and his teaching strategies to European journals, which were "read by thousands." In January 1842, Charles Dickens visited the Institution, and afterwards he wrote enthusiastically in his American Notes of Howe's success with Bridgman. Dickens quotes Howe's account of Bridgman's education:

Her social feelings, and her affections, are very strong; and when she is sitting at work, or by the side of one of her little friends, she will break off from her task every few moments, to hug and kiss them with an earnestness and warmth that is touching to behold. When left alone, she occupies and apparently amuses herself, and seems quite content; and so strong seems to be the natural tendency of thought to put on the garb of language, that she often soliloquizes in the finger language, slow and tedious as it is. But it is only when alone, that she is quiet; for if she becomes sensible of the presence of any one near her, she is restless until she can sit close beside them, hold their hand, and converse with them by sign.

Following the publication of Dickens's book, Bridgman became world famous. Thousands of people visited her at the Perkins School, "asked for keepsakes, followed her in the newspapers, and read paeans to her in evangelical journals and ladies' magazines". On Saturdays, the school was open to the public. Crowds gathered to watch Laura read and point out locations on a map with raised letters. Laura became "very much excited" by these events, but her teachers were concerned because Laura knew she drew more attention than the other students. In the late 1840s, Howe said that "perhaps there are not three living women whose names are more widely known than Laura Bridgman's; and there is not one who has excited so much sympathy and interest."

== Teenage years ==
Bridgman suffered a series of emotional losses during her teenage years and early twenties. In 1841, Lydia Drew, Laura's first teacher at the Perkins School, left her teaching position to marry. Drew was replaced by Mary Swift, an excellent teacher, though not as openly affectionate with Bridgman as Drew had been. Swift also attempted to instill Bridgman with her Congregationalist religious views in direct defiance of Howe's New England Unitarianism. An even more devastating loss occurred in May 1843 when Howe married Julia Ward, a woman 18 years his junior. Howe had treated Bridgman as a daughter, and she had loved him as a father. She was depressed by the lengthy separation following the marriage—the Howes' honeymoon in Europe lasted 15 months—and worried that Howe would no longer love her now that he had taken a wife. Bridgman's fears were realized when the couple returned from their honeymoon in August 1844. Howe had lost interest in Bridgman, though he had made provisions for her to have a home at the school for life. Bridgman never developed a close relationship with Julia Ward Howe who, according to her daughters, had a "physical distaste for the abnormal and defective" and a "natural shrinking from the blind and other defectives with whom she was often thrown" following her marriage to Howe. Mary Swift left the school in May 1845 to get married, leaving Bridgman without any instruction for several months. Bridgman's next teacher, Sarah Wight, compensated for many of the losses Bridgman had suffered in recent years. A gentle, religious, outwardly timid young woman to whom Bridgman was immediately drawn, Wight taught Bridgman the traditional academic subjects — mathematics, history, geography — but she also set aside plenty of time for the two of them to engage in "finger" conversations, one of the activities Bridgman liked best. While Wight cared deeply for Bridgman, she also felt that, because of her "celebrity" status, the girl enjoyed privileges denied to other students. Bridgman had a private room, and she rarely mingled with the other students unless they paid her "particular attention". Wight also saw that Bridgman could be willful and irritable, behavior characteristics that required discipline. Bridgman could also be emotionally demanding of her young teacher, becoming peevish and short-tempered whenever Wight wanted some time alone.

In 1845 at the age of sixteen, Bridgman developed anorexia, her weight falling from 113 pounds to 79 pounds. Howe rightly surmised that Bridgman was "reacting to the many abandonments and losses she had endured," and he proposed that she pay a visit to her family, with whom she had had little contact in recent years. Accompanied by Wight, Bridgman traveled to her family's New Hampshire farm in June 1846. She particularly enjoyed being reunited with her mother, sisters Mary and Collina, and brother Addison, who was able to communicate with Bridgman in sign language. She was also reunited with her old friend Asa Tenney, who visited her frequently during her two-week stay. Though Bridgman resumed eating, her often obstinate and temperamental behavior persisted; this troubled Wight, who understood that few people would endure such conduct in a grown woman.

Wight left the Perkins School in November 1850, having spent five years as Bridgman's teacher and companion. Wight was engaged to a Unitarian missionary, George Bond, and following their marriage, the couple planned to travel to the Sandwich Islands (Hawaii). Bridgman begged to go along as Wight's housekeeper but, ultimately, Wight went without her, leaving Bridgman with no friend, companion or teacher to console her.

== Religion ==
With no outward sources of consolation, Bridgman turned inward to prayer and meditation. She eventually embraced her family's Baptist religion and was baptized in July 1862. She began occasionally to write devotional poems, of which "Holy Home" is the best known:

Heaven is holy home.
Holy Home is from ever
lasting to ever lasting.
Holy home is Summery.
Holy home shall endure
forever...

Bridgman feared death, but she saw heaven as a "place where these fears might at last be laid to rest".

== Adult years ==
Bridgman's formal education ended when Wight left the school in 1850. She returned to New Hampshire and, for a time, she enjoyed being reunited with her family; however, she was homesick for the school and her anorexia eventually returned. When Howe learned that Bridgman's health was rapidly deteriorating, he sent a teacher, Mary Paddock, to the Bridgman home to take his former student back to the school. Bridgman's health gradually improved, and though she received occasional visitors, she was now largely forgotten by the public. She occupied herself by writing letters to her mother and a few friends — Bridgman kept in touch with both Mary Swift and Sarah Wight — sewing, reading the Bible in braille, and keeping her room fastidiously clean. She earned a little spending money, about $100 a year, from selling her crocheted doilies, purses, and embroidered handkerchiefs, but she was primarily dependent upon the school to supply her with room and board.

Bridgman was a skilled textile creator, making intricate lace collars and other trim such as complicated bead work. Examples of her work are available in museum archives, including her tatting examples at the Perkins School for the Blind.

Bridgman lived a relatively quiet and uneventful life at the school. She never became a full-time teacher, but she assisted the young blind girls in their sewing classes, where she was considered a "patient but demanding instructor." In 1872, several cottages (each under a matron) for the blind girls were added to the Perkins campus, and Bridgman was moved from the larger house of the Institution into one of them. Bridgman, always eager for someone to communicate with in sign language, befriended Anne Sullivan when they shared a cottage in the early 1880s. The death of Howe in 1876 was a great grief to her, but before he died he had made arrangements ensuring her financial security at the school for the rest of her life. In 1887 her jubilee was celebrated there. On February 13, 1889, Nellie Bly interviewed her for the New York World newspaper. In 1889 she was taken ill, and died on May 24. She was buried at Dana Cemetery in Hanover, New Hampshire near her family's farm.

== Legacy ==
Bridgman became famous in her youth as an example of the education of a deaf-blind person. Helen Keller's mother, Kate Keller, read Dickens's account in American Notes and was inspired to seek advice which led to her hiring a teacher and former pupil of the same school, Anne Sullivan. Sullivan learned the manual alphabet at the Perkins Institution which she took back to Helen, along with a doll wearing clothing that Bridgman had sewn herself.

Bridgman's case is mentioned in La Symphonie Pastorale by André Gide.

A Liberty ship, SS Laura Bridgman, was named after her.

In 2014, a fictional account of the life of Bridgman, What Is Visible by Kimberly Elkins, was published.

== See also ==
- Helen Keller
- Ragnhild Kåta
- Julia Brace
- Victorine Morriseau
