= Isabel Greeley =

American educator

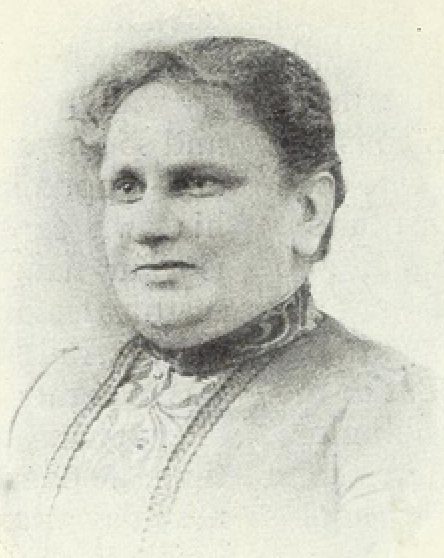
- Isabel Greeley, from a publication
- Born: Mary Isabel Greeley; February 9, 1843; Manchester, New Hampshire
- Died: May 10, 1928 (aged 85); New York City
- Occupation: Educator

Mary Isabel Greeley (February 9, 1843 – May 10, 1928) was an American educator. From 1887 to 1899 she was first matron at the Perkins School for the Blind's kindergarten program, based in Boston's Jamaica Plain neighborhood, and later a founder and president of the Boston Nursery for Blind Babies.

== Early life ==
Greeley was born in Manchester, New Hampshire, the daughter of Samuel Plummer Greeley and Mary Jane Wheeler Greeley. Her father was a harness maker. She graduated from Concord High School in 1860.

== Career ==
In 1884, Greeley was appointed to represent New Hampshire women at the World Cotton Centennial Exposition in New Orleans, as part of the women's department headed by Julia Ward Howe. Howe's son-in-law Michael Anagnos hired Greeley as the first matron of the Perkins School's kindergarten program for blind children, opened in Jamaica Plain in 1887.

After she retired from the Perkins kindergarten in 1899, Greeley became treasurer of the new Boston Nursery for Blind Babies. "Why should not blind babies have a nursery and be cared for as well as the swarms of seeing babies that fill to overflowing our day nurseries in all our large cities?" she asked in a 1907 conference presentation, concluding that such early intervention "may give a man his sight; it may prevent his becoming a public charge, and it may help him to a more useful life". In 1926 the Boston Nursery for Blind Babies incorporated, with Greeley as its first president. She also worked with Sarah J. Davidson to open a "private sanitarium for invalids".

Greeley spent some of her time in New Hampshire, where she was active in the Daughters of the American Revolution.

== Personal life ==
Greeley was staying with her younger brother in New York City when she died there in 1928, at the age of 85. The Boston Nursery for Blind Babies's next president was Mary L. Washburn. The Nursery became the Boston Center for Blind Children, and continues under that name as of 2022.
