= Tony DeBlois =

- Born: Anthony Thomas DeBlois; January 22, 1974 (age 52)
- Genre: Jazz
- Occupation: Musician
- Instrument: Piano

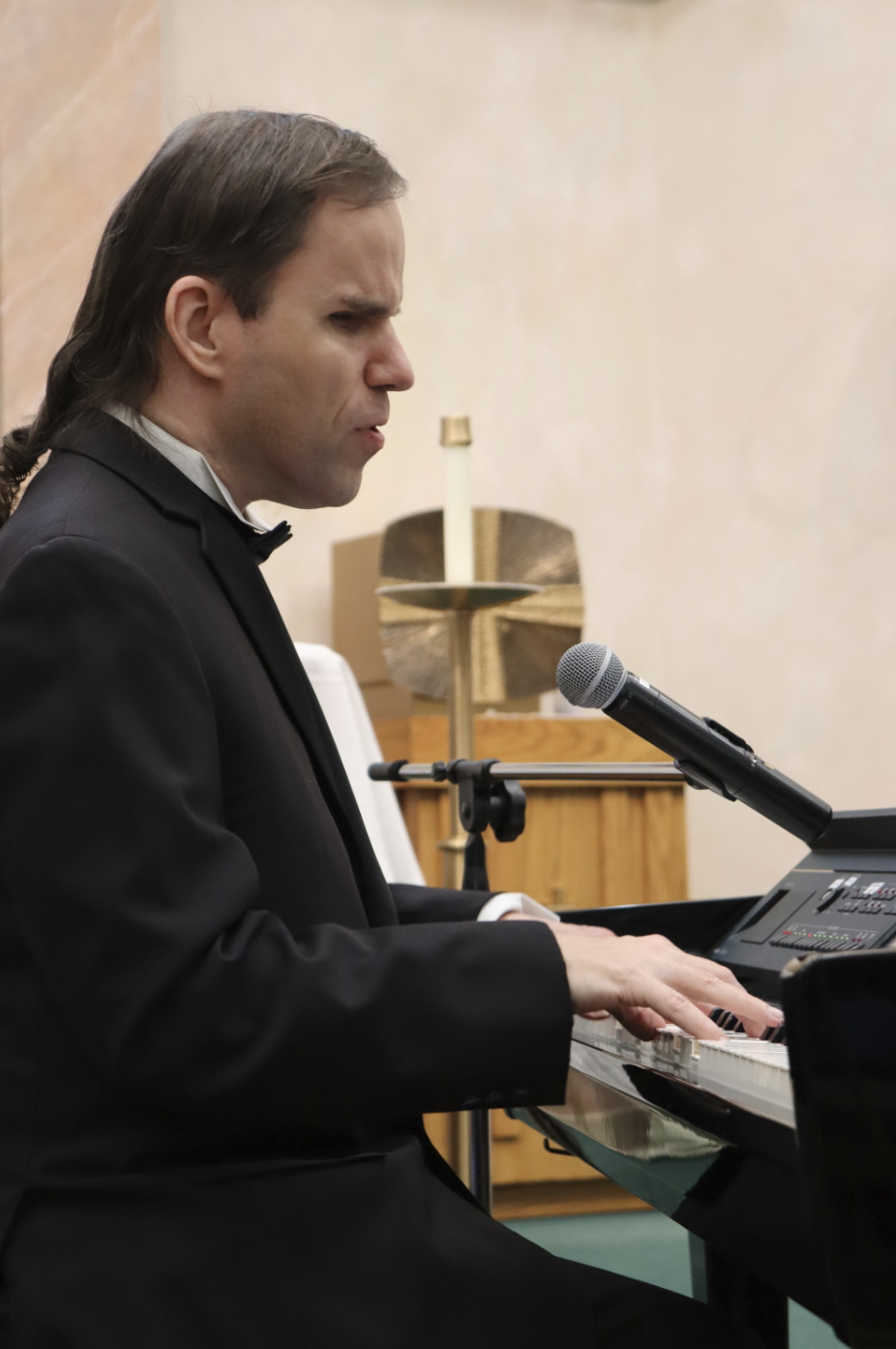
Tony DeBlois performing piano during a concert at SSM Health Treffert Center in 2022. Tony is a blind, autistic musical savant who demonstrates extreme gifts in music despite his disabilities.

Anthony Thomas "Tony" DeBlois is a blind American autistic savant and musician.

== Early life ==
Tony DeBlois was born on January 22, 1974. Weighing less than two pounds, he was premature and had to be supplied with large amounts of oxygen. Large amounts of oxygen cause blindness (Retinopathy of Prematurity), and the physicians during this time were unaware of this. Consequently, Tony became blind at just a few days old. He began to play piano at the age of two. At first, DeBlois studied in the Texas School for the Blind in Austin, Texas, then the Perkins School for the Blind in Boston, Massachusetts, but in 1989 was awarded a summer scholarship at Berklee College of Music in Boston, Massachusetts. Later, he was admitted as a full-time student and graduated magna cum laude in 1996.

== Career ==
DeBlois specializes in jazz but can play just about any other type of music as well. A savant, he plays 20 musical instruments and has held concerts worldwide but also has his own band, Goodnuf. He can play about 8,000 pieces from memory.

A TV movie was made on Tony DeBlois' life, entitled Journey of the Heart (1997) starring Cybill Shepherd as Janice DeBlois, Jeremy Lelliott / Chris Demetral (as young Tony), Blake Heron as Tony's younger brother Ray, and with an appearance of Tony DeBlois himself playing piano at the end of the movie. It was produced by Ronnie D. Clemmer and Richard P. Kughn.
