= Perkins Braille and Talking Book Library =

Library

- Location: Watertown, Massachusetts
- Branches: 1

Access and use
- Population served: 18,000 - 20,000 (2007 estimate)

Other information
- Director: Kim Charlson
- Website: http://www.perkinslibrary.org

The Perkins Braille and Talking Book Library is located in Watertown, Massachusetts on the campus of the Perkins School for the Blind. Services are provided free of charge to eligible users. The library is a branch of the National Library Service for the Blind and Physically Handicapped, a division of the Library of Congress. The library provides materials in alternate format to those who have difficulty reading books in standard print format.

== History ==
The original library collection was begun in the early 19th century. Perkins maintained a collection of braille books as well as braille music for the use of the students. In 1931 the Pratt-Smoot Act was passed and 18 Braille and Talking Book Libraries were set up across the country (19 including the Library of Congress).

== Recording Studio ==
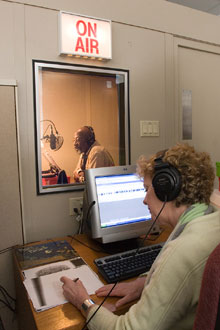
A narrator and monitor record a digital-audio book, or "talking book" for the Perkins Braille and Talking Book Library

The recording studio housed within Perkins School for the Blind's Library records and produces digital audio books—local titles for its main collection that are then shared with the National Library Service for the Blind and Physically Handicapped (NLS) and custom audio books for anything from a student’s math textbook to narration of Massachusetts Bay Transportation Authority (MBTA) documents, such as bus schedules, made readable for customers who are blind or otherwise print disabled.

== Services ==
The library offers braille books to the residents of Massachusetts, Rhode Island, Maine, New Hampshire, and Vermont. The library provides Talking Books for Massachusetts and Rhode Island patrons. Although the library offers these services to the residents of other states, the residents must sign up for services through each state's individual regional library. The library also offers the use of the Newsline service (a service run by the National Federation of the Blind) as well as downloadable audio books to its Massachusetts patrons only.

The library offers museum passes to several local and regional museums. The museum passes are only available to Massachusetts residents as they are provided through funding by the Friends of Braille and Talking Book Library and not through federal funds.

The library advocates for braille literacy in part through its Braille Awareness Kits. These are kits of information including braille alphabet cards and braille books and are lent out to help spread the knowledge of braille.

== Administration ==
The library is a branch library of the National Library Service for the Blind and Physically Handicapped and as such its title is the Massachusetts Regional Library. The library is subject to the rules and regulations governing all such bodies. The library resides on the campus of the Perkins School for the Blind which administers most capital and personnel concerns.

== Awards ==
In 2012 Perkins Braille and Talking Book Library shared the Association for Specialized and Cooperative Library Agencies' ASCLA/KLAS/NOD Award for their work in providing services for library users with disabilities.
