= Bay Islands Sign Language =

Deaf sign language of Honduras

- French Harbour Sign Language
- Native to: Honduras
- Region: Bay Islands
- Language family: village sign language

Language codes
- ISO 639-3: None (mis)
- Glottolog: fren1280

Bay Islands Sign Language (BISL), also known as French Harbour Sign Language, is an indigenous village sign language of Honduras.

== Geographic distribution ==
The language has been used for at least three generations, in the towns of French Harbour and Jonesville, on the island of Roatán. It is also used on Guanaja.

== Signers ==
There is a high incidence of Usher syndrome in French Harbour, which causes deafness, and blindness later in life. The language is used by deaf, hearing, and deafblind people, and there is evidence of intergenerational transmission. The language seems to have primarily been used by white islanders.

== Linguistics ==
BISL has both visual and tactile modes. The addressee's face and body are often touched during conversation. In conversation with sighted individuals, signing can be purely visual.
