= SS Laura Bridgman =

World War II Liberty ship of the United States

History

United States
- Name: Laura Bridgman
- Namesake: Laura Bridgman
- Ordered: as type (EC2-S-C1) hull, MC hull 2382
- Builder: J.A. Jones Construction, Brunswick, Georgia
- Cost: $892,876
- Yard number: 167
- Way number: 3
- Laid down: 23 September 1944
- Launched: 30 October 1944
- Sponsored by: Ida Purcell
- Completed: 13 November 1944
- Identification: Call Signal: KTAF
- Fate: Laid up in the National Defense Reserve Fleet, Suisun Bay Group, Suisun Bay, California, 16 October 1945; Laid up in the National Defense Reserve Fleet, Hudson River Group, 13 July 1950; Sold for commercial use, 17 January 1950

United States
- Name: Catherine
- Owner: Drytrans
- Acquired: 17 January 1950
- Fate: Sold, September 1957

Liberia
- Acquired: September 1957
- Fate: Sold, 14 May 1958

United States
- Name: Penn Explorer
- Owner: Penntrans Co.
- Acquired: 14 May 1958
- Fate: Sold, 29 November 1961

Liberia
- Acquired: 29 November 1961
- Fate: Scrapped, 1968

General characteristics
- Class & type: Liberty ship; type EC2-S-C1, standard
- Tonnage: 10,865 LT DWT; 7,176 GRT
- Displacement: 3,380 long tons (3,434 t) (light); 14,245 long tons (14,474 t) (max)
- Length: 441 feet 6 inches (135 m) oa; 416 feet (127 m) pp; 427 feet (130 m) lwl
- Beam: 57 feet (17 m)
- Draft: 27 ft 9.25 in (8.4646 m)
- Installed power: 2 × Oil fired 450 °F (232 °C) boilers, operating at 220 psi (1,500 kPa); 2,500 hp (1,900 kW)
- Propulsion: 1 × triple-expansion steam engine, (manufactured by General Machinery Corp., Hamilton, Ohio); 1 × screw propeller
- Speed: 11.5 knots (21.3 km/h; 13.2 mph)
- Capacity: 562,608 cubic feet (15,931 m^{3}) (grain); 499,573 cubic feet (14,146 m^{3}) (bale)
- Complement: 38–62 USMM; 21–40 USNAG
- Armament: Varied by ship; Bow-mounted 3-inch (76 mm)/50-caliber gun; Stern-mounted 4-inch (102 mm)/50-caliber gun; 2–8 × single 20-millimeter (0.79 in) Oerlikon anti-aircraft (AA) cannons and/or, 2–8 × 37-millimeter (1.46 in) M1 AA guns

SS Laura Bridgman was a Liberty ship built in the United States during World War II. She was named after Laura Bridgman, the first deaf-blind American child to gain a significant education in the English language.

== Construction ==
Laura Bridgman was laid down on 23 September 1944, under a Maritime Commission (MARCOM) contract, MC hull 2382, by J.A. Jones Construction, Brunswick, Georgia; she was sponsored by Ida Purcell, the wife of bishop Clare Purcell, and launched on 30 October 1944.

== History ==
She was allocated to Seas Shipping Co., Inc., on 13 November 1944. On 16 October 1945, she was laid up in the National Defense Reserve Fleet, in the Suisun Bay Group. She was removed from the fleet on 26 June 1950, to be loaded with grain, she relocated to the National Defense Reserve Fleet, in the Hudson River Group, on 13 July 1950. On 12 December 1950, she was withdrawn from the fleet to be unloaded, she returned to the fleet empty on 19 December 1950. On 17 January 1951, she was sold to Drytrans, Inc., and renamed Catherine. In September 1957, she was transferred to a Liberian shipping company. On 14 May 1958, she was sold to Penntrans Co., and renamed Penn Explorer. She was again sold to a Liberian company on 29 November 1961. She was scrapped in 1968.

== Bibliography ==
- "Jones Construction, Brunswick GA". www.ShipbuildingHistory.com. 13 October 2010.
- "Liberty Ships – World War II".
- Maritime Administration. "Laura Bridgman". Ship History Database Vessel Status Card. U.S. Department of Transportation, Maritime Administration. Archived from the original on 12 December 2019.
- Davies, James (May 2004). "Specifications (As-Built)" (PDF). p. 23.
- "SS Laura Bridgman".
