= Albert Balchen =

Norwegian barrister, economist and politician (1874–1940)

- Born: October 22, 1874
- Died: June 11, 1940 (aged 65)
- Occupations: Barrister, economist, politician
- Political party: Centre
- Father: Fredrik Glad Balchen

Albert Balchen (22 October 1874 – 11 June 1940) was a Norwegian barrister, economist, editor and politician for the Centre Party.

== Biography ==
He was born on 22 October 1874, in Vestre Aker, to Fredrik Glad Balchen (1815–1999) and Valgerda Benjamine, née Heiberg. He finished his secondary education in 1893, graduated with the cand.jur. degree in 1899 and the dr.philos. degree in economics in 1907. Following a few years as a deputy judge and junior solicitor, he settled in Kristiania as an attorney before embarking on the doctoral thesis. His thesis concerned trade balance, and from 1908 to 1910 he chaired the economics group of the Polytechnic Society. From 1909, he was the secretary-general of De norske eksportnæringers landsforbund while continuing to practice law, from 1910 as a barrister with access to working with Supreme Court cases. In 1914, he married Hildur Jenssen.

He was also a contributor to the newspaper Verdens Gang from 1910, and board member from 1911, but left in 1913. From 1915 to 1925, he edited the economic magazines Norsk Exporttidende and Tidsskrift for bank- og finansvæsen.

Politically, Balchen aligned with the Norwegian Agrarian Association as a member of their working group on customs policy from 1912 to 1913. He later headed the Norwegian Taxpayers Association, only to return to the Agrarian Association in 1924 to shape a proposition on state budget cuts. In 1930, he became Oslo county chairman of the Agrarian Party. In the 1930 Norwegian parliamentary election he was the Agrarian Party's second ballot candidate behind Thorvald Aadahl, and in the 1933 Norwegian parliamentary election, he headed the ballot. Neither attempt resulted in his election. He was also considered as Minister of Trade in Kolstad's Cabinet. In the 1934 Norwegian local elections, Balchen stood as the Agrarians' top candidate, and the third candidate overall, on a joint list with Nasjonal Samling and the Free-minded People's Party. Already in 1931, Balchen had become a member of the 31-man strong "central committee" of Vidkun Quisling's organization at the time, Nordiske Folkereisning. In 1933, Balchen issued the pamphlet Nasjonal politikk ("National Politics"), where he among others espoused the racial superiority of the Norwegian people, whose individualism would be a "bulwark against collectivism and the other isms of lesser peoples and social classes". In 1934, he was elected to Leidangen's board in Oslo.

Balchen died the day after Norway had succumbed to invading German forces, 11 June 1940, aged 66.
