= Joseph Brown Smith =

American music instructor

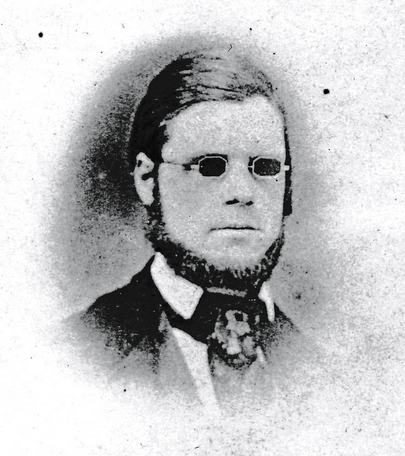
- Born: March 14, 1823; Dover, New Hampshire, United States
- Died: May 6, 1859 (aged 36)
- Education: Harvard University
- Occupations: Professor; Music instructor; Organist
- Spouses: Elizabeth Jane Cone (m. 1846; died 1851) Sarah J. Nash (m. 1853)

Joseph Brown Smith (March 14, 1823 – May 6, 1859) was an American music instructor and notable graduate of the Perkins School for the Blind. He was the first blind student to graduate from college in the United States.

== Early life ==
Joseph Brown Smith was born on March 14, 1823, in Dover, New Hampshire. An infection within the week of his birth caused him to become blind. His father died when he was three years old, at which time he moved with his mother to Portsmouth, New Hampshire.

== Education and career ==
In 1832, Smith enrolled at the Perkins School for the Blind in Watertown, Massachusetts, at age nine. He studied under Samuel Gridley Howe and would become "[h]is most prized student," according to one author. Smith would later travel with Howe on promotional exhibitions throughout the United States, showcasing his mathematical abilities, to help advocate for education for the blind.

Smith enrolled in Harvard in 1840 at age seventeen, the first Perkins graduate to do so. Harvard professor John White Webster worked with Howe to help secure funding for Smith's tuition over the next four years. While at Harvard, Smith was involved with the Institute of 1770, an early iteration of the Harvard Glee Club. In 1844, he graduated, becoming the first blind student to graduate from college in the United States.

In 1844, Smith became Professor of Music at what would become the Kentucky School for the Blind. During this time, he also worked at the First Unitarian Church of Louisville as a part-time organist and taught private lessons.

== Later life and death ==
Smith married Elizabeth Jane Cone on August 9, 1846. They had a son named Joseph Haydn, after the Austrian composer of the same name. Elizabeth died on June 14, 1851. Smith then married Sarah J. Nash on July 26, 1853. They had a son named Bryce Patton.

Smith died in 1859, aged 36, after battling illness.

== Published musical works ==
In 1842, two of Smith's short piano compositions, "Harvard Waltz" and "Harvard Quick Step," were published by C. H. Keith.

During his time in Louisville, Smith published seven songs and piano works:

- Araby's Daughter (Louisville: F.W. Ratcliffe, 1852)
- I Have Known Thee in the Sunshine (Louisville: F.W. Ratcliffe, 1851)
- I Know Thou Art Gone to the Home of Thy Rest (Louisville: F.W. Ratcliffe, 1851)
- O'er the Bright Moonlit Sea (Louisville: F.W. Ratcliffe, 1851)
- The Swing (Louisville: G.W. Brainard, 1851)
- The First Beatitude (Louisville: F.W. Ratcliffe, 1851)
- Waltz Scherzando (Louisville: F.W. Ratcliffe, n.d.)
