= Mary Swift Lamson =

American educator and writer (1822-1909)

- Born: Mary Swift; June 22, 1822; Nantucket, Massachusetts
- Died: March 2, 1909 (aged 86); Cambridge, Massachusetts
- Education: Lexington Normal School
- Occupation: Educator
- Spouse: Edwin Lamson (1846-1876)

Mary Swift Lamson (b. 1822 - d. 1909), was an American educator and writer best known as a teacher of Laura Bridgman, at the Perkins Institute for the Blind. She wrote the book Life and Education of Laura Dewey Bridgman, the Deaf, Dumb, and Blind Girl (1884) about her experiences teaching Bridgman.

== Early life and education ==
Lamson was born Mary Swift in Nantucket, Massachusetts, on June 22, 1822. Her parents were Dr. Paul Swift and Dorcas Swift (née Gardner). In 1840, she graduated with the first class of Lexington Normal School (now Framingham State University) and married Boston varnish gum importer Edwin Lamson (1811-1876) in Philadelphia, Pennsylvania on June 22, 1846, her twenty-fourth birthday.

== Career ==
=== Perkins Institute for the Blind ===
Lamson worked at the Perkins Institute for the Blind under superintendent Samuel Gridley Howe. In 1841, Lamson replaced Lydia Drew as the primary teacher and companion of deafblind student Laura Bridgman, a position which she held until her marriage to Edwin Lamson in 1846.

When Lamson left her position at the Perkins Institute, Howe wrote that Lamson was an "able and excellent teacher...Indeed, to Miss Swift and Miss [Sarah] Wight belong, far more than to any other persons, the pure satisfaction of having been instrumental in the beautiful development of Laura's character."

=== Writing ===
In 1884, Lamson published a book about her experiences teaching Bridgman titled Life and Education of Laura Dewey Bridgman, the Deaf, Dumb, and Blind Girl. The book reportedly drew heavily from journals kept by Lamson during her time as a teacher at the Perkins Institute. It was published by Houghton, Mifflin & Co. and includes an introduction by Edwards A. Park of Andover Theological Seminary.

In the book's preface, Lamson wrote that she published the book in response to requests for a published account of Bridgman's life and education from Howe, Dr. Frances Lieber, and others. In this preface, Lamson writes, "My aim will be simply to state facts, and in making selections from the daily reports of her teachers to omit nothing which can be of service in any department of science."

Lamson also wrote journals about her travels through the American South in 1855 and her travels by steamboat on the Great Lakes in 1868, though these were not published in her lifetime.

== Private life ==
Mary and Edwin Lamson had four children: Mary (1847-1848), Helen (born 1852), Gardner (born 1855) and Kate (born 1859).

Mary Swift Lamson died in Cambridge, Massachusetts on March 2, 1909.
