= Roch-Ambroise Cucurron Sicard =

French abbé and instructor of the deaf

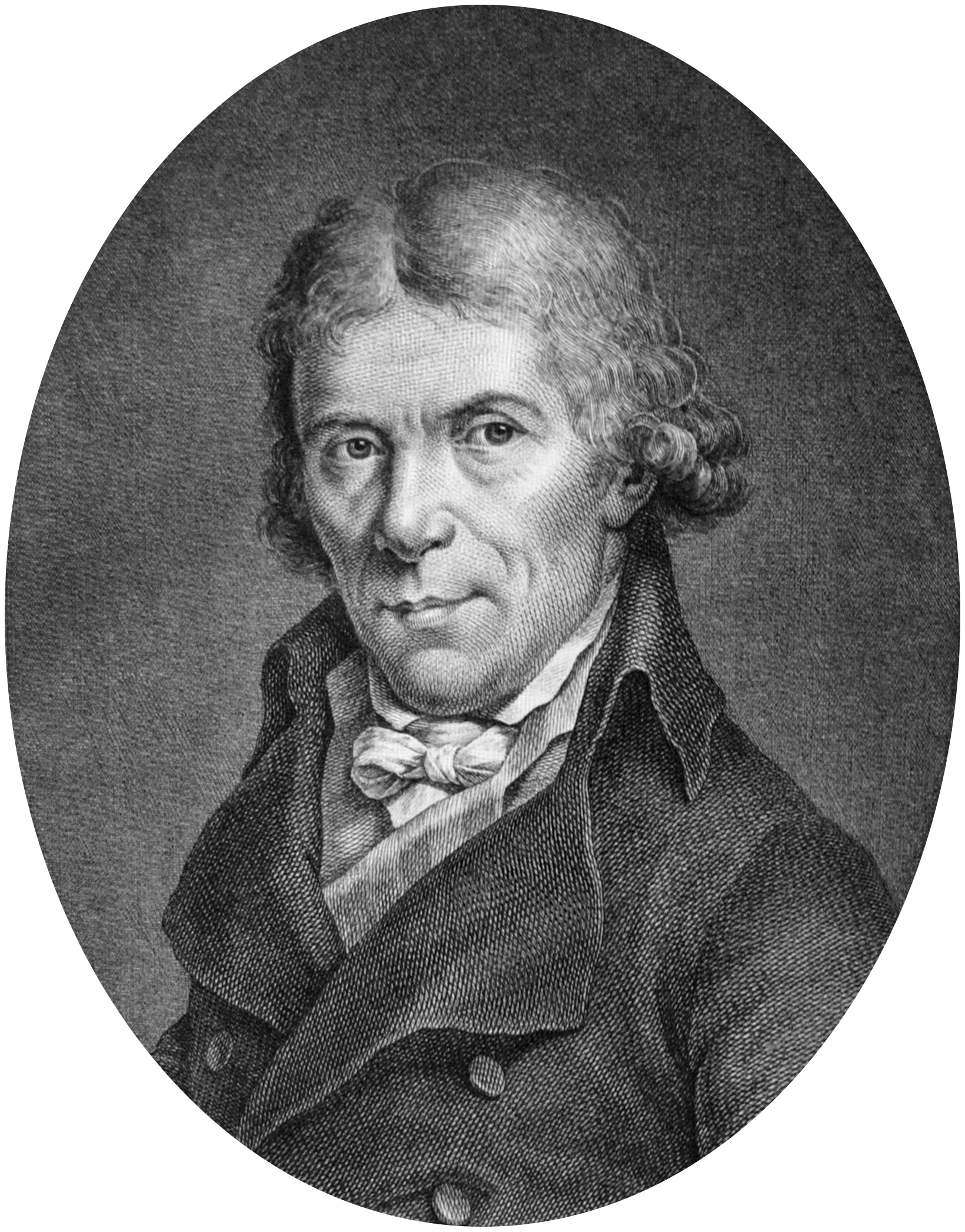
Roch-Ambroise Cucurron Sicard, copper engraving by Charles-Etienne Gaucher, after the drawing of Joseph Jauffret (Musée de la Révolution française).

Roch-Ambroise Cucurron Sicard (French: [ʁɔk ɑ̃bʁwaz kykyʁɔ̃ sikaʁ]; 20 September 1742 – 10 May 1822) was a French Catholic abbé (priest) and educator of the deaf.

Born at Le Fousseret, in the ancient Province of Languedoc (now the Department of Haute-Garonne), and educated as a priest, Sicard was made principal of a school for the deaf at Bordeaux in 1786, and in 1789, on the death of the Abbé de l'Épée, succeeded him at L'Institut National de Jeunes Sourds de Paris which Épée had founded in Paris. He later met Thomas Hopkins Gallaudet while traveling in England, and invited him to visit the school.

Sicard's chief works were his Eléments de grammaire générale (1799), Cours d'instruction d'un sourd-muet de naissance (1800) and Traité des signes pour l'instruction des sourds-muets (1808). The Abbé Sicard managed to escape any serious harm in the political troubles of 1792, and became a member of the Institute in 1795, but the value of his educational work was hardly recognized till shortly before his death at Paris.

In 1803 Sicard became a member of the Académie française, occupying Seat 3 as the successor to the François-Joachim de Pierre de Bernis, who was a diplomat.

== See also ==
- Roch-Ambroise Auguste Bébian
