= Fredrik Glad Balchen =

Norwegian teacher of the deaf (1815–1899)

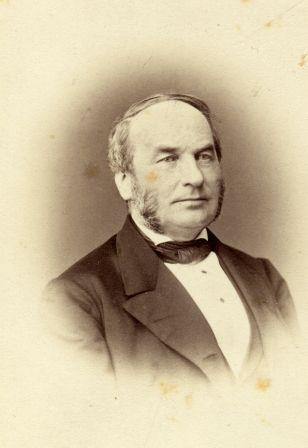

Fredrik Glad Balchen (6 April 1815 – 24 April 1899) was a Norwegian teacher of the deaf.

== Personal and early life ==
Balchen was born on 6 April 1815, in Bergen, to chaplain Johan Peter Balchen (1783–1827) and his wife Christiane Wilhelmine Gulbrandsen (1789–1819). His early childhood was impacted by his mother's death when he was four years old, and his father's when he was twelve. He married Benjamine Walgerda Heiberg (1845–1926) on 16 September 1869, the daughter of Caspar Cappelen Heiberg (1814–1855) and Emilie Christine Hansine Bjertnæs (1824–1865).

== Career and education ==
Upon finishing his examen artium at the University of Oslo, he started studying theology. Owing to his economic difficulties, Balchen started teaching at Ole Jacob Broch and Hartvig Nissen's Latin school.

Balchen eventually applied for a concession to establish a deaf school in Christiania. The King had erstwhile announced a state stipend to a person taking an education suited for creating a deaf school in South Norway. (Note: The only hitherto created deaf school in Norway was located in Trondheim.)

The executive board at the deaf school in Trondheim was sceptical towards Balchen, apparently because of his lack of religious education. He nevertheless gained a half-year stay at the school, impressing the authorities with his command of French orthography. The Norwegian government subsequently sponsored Balchen's study trip to Germany.

Balchen visited some of the most important German deaf schools, and met among others the teacher and inspector Friedrich Moritz Hill at the deaf school in Weißenfels. Balchen returned to Norway in 1847, and started teaching two deaf girls the following year. In 1849, he received state support for this practice.

There were in the beginning only three to five students at his school—which was named Christiania Døvstumme-Institut, but as time passed, more students came, and Balchen bought boarding rooms in the area for students hailing from the suburbs. Later on, Balchen started a class for students he considered qualified to study. Two of the students—Lars Havstad and Halvard Aschehoug—took examen artium with good grades in 1871. Balchen's school became very popular and had a good reputation, and even students from far-abroad travelled to Norway for education

In 1857, the school was moved from Karl Johans gate—approximately where Grand Hotel is today—to Schafteløkken at Elisenberg, Frogner. The school stayed there until 1891, when it was relocated to Vibes gate at Hegdehaugen. Five years later, the school was nationalised.

== Later life and death ==
In 1873, Balchen was rewarded the Order of St. Olav for his efforts for the deaf. He was also appointed member of a committee to prepare a law granting deaf, blind and those with developmental disabilities the right to compulsory education. One such law came into force for the deaf on 1 July 1883, for the blind in 1885 and for the mentally disabled in 1891. After having stepped down from his positions at the deaf school, Balchen died, ahead 84.

His son Albert went on to become a politician.

== See also ==
- Andreas Christian Møller, founder of the school for the deaf in Trondheim
- Elias Hofgard, founder of the school for the deaf in Hamar
- Norwegian Sign Language
