= Lars Havstad =

Norwegian statistician, politician and writer

Lars Aanonsen Havstad (3 February 1851 – 29 August 1913) was a Norwegian statistician, writer, secretary in the Liberal Party, newspaper editor and activist. He was deaf as well as blind in one eye, and was the first (along with Halvard Aschehoug) deaf person to pass the examen artium in Norway.

== Professional career ==
He was born as Lars Aanonsen Larssen in Arendal as a son of customs officer Aanon Larssen (1820–1863) and Christine Christophersen (1824–1895). He grew up in Tønsberg, but following scarlet fever and meningitis at the age of five, he became deaf as well as blind in one eye. He read for himself until enrolling in school in 1860, at Christiania Døvstumme-Institut in Christiania. His teacher Fredrik Glad Balchen created a class for special talented students, who he and external teachers tutored to reach the level of normal students. Two of four students in the talent class, one of them being Havstad, managed to pass the examen artium in 1871. Havstad and Halvard Aschehoug were the first two deaf people who passed the Norwegian examen artium, at that time regarded as a sensation. The examen artium was the final examination in Norwegian secondary schools until 1974.

After three years of working at the institute, Havstad was hired in Det statistiske kontor in 1874, a statistical office within the Norwegian Ministry of the Interior. He later worked in the Office of the Auditor General of Norway, and a number of his statistical analyses were published.

== Political career ==
Havstad is also known as the private secretary of liberal politician Johan Sverdrup. In 1882 Havstad published Sverdrup's parliamentary speeches from 1851 to 1881. He also wrote for liberal newspaper Dagbladet and was the political editor and editor-in-chief of Eidsvold from 1894 to 1897. In 1875, he published Forholdet mellom Kongen, Statsraadet og Storthinget together with J. F. Heiberg, and also wrote articles in liberal historian Ernst Sars' journal.

Historian Jens Arup Seip noted that Havstad had racist tendencies in describing the civil servants' and bourgeoisie's role in Norwegian history. Analyzing the 1882 Norwegian parliamentary election, Havstad claimed that the conservative voters (the voters for the candidates who in 1884 formed the Conservative Party) consisted of foreigners, descendants of foreigners as well as "people of real Norwegian heritage", but who had become assimilated because of "repeated contact with the immigrated". The district Viken was described as "[t]his dead belt which must first be permeated by the national spirit before the alien elements can be devoured by the body of society".

== Activism for the deaf ==
In 1876 he published the article Skoletvang for Døvstumme in Aftenbladet, which was about compulsory schooling for the deaf-mute. Schooling for both deaf, blind and mentally disabled people was introduced in 1883, and Havstad was given much of the credit. He co-founded the interest society De Norske Døvstummes Forening in 1878, and was vice chairman until 1891 and chairman from 1891 to 1894. He was decorated with an honorary Master's degree at the National Deaf-Mute College in Washington, DC.

== Personal and late life ==
In 1877 he changed his last name from Larssen to Havstad. In February 1886 he married Hedvig Augusta Schüssler (1863–1933). She was able to hear. He was a brother-in-law of deaf people's teacher Elias Hofgaard, who was married to Havstad's wife's sister. Havstad was killed in a tram collision in August 1913 in Kristiania.
