= Institut National de Jeunes Sourds de Paris =

School for the Deaf in Paris, France

National Institute for Deaf Youth of Paris
- Institut National de Jeunes Sourds de Paris

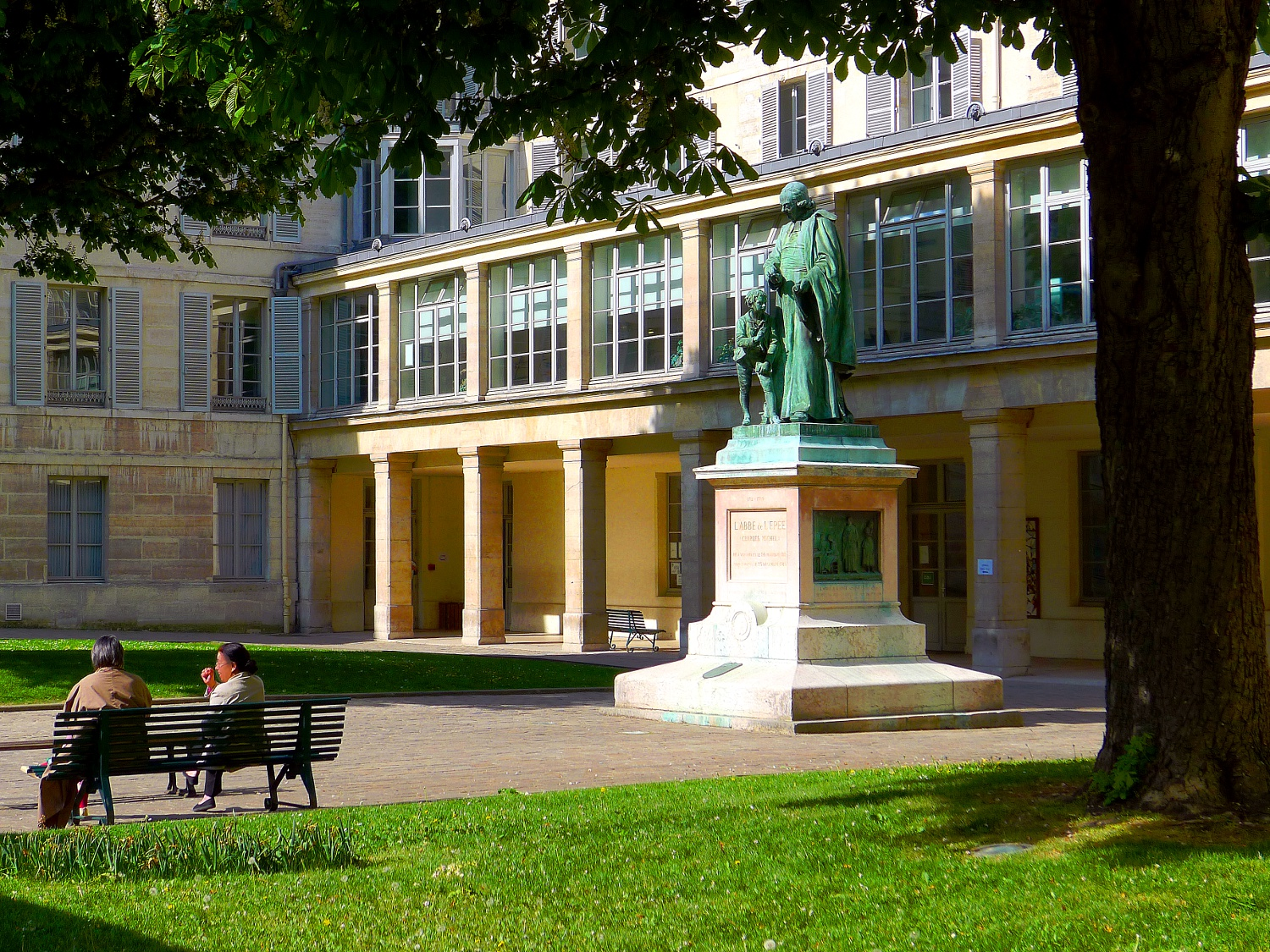
- Interior courtyard with the statue of founder Charles-Michel de l'Épée

Location
- 254, rue Saint-Jacques, Paris, France

Information
- Former name: Institution Nationale des Sourds-Muets à Paris
- Type: Public
- Established: 1760; 266 years ago
- Founder: Charles-Michel de l'Épée
- Director: Élodie Hemery
- Website: www.injs-paris.fr

Institut National de Jeunes Sourds de Paris (French: [ɛ̃stity nɑsjɔnal də ʒœn suʁ də paʁi], National Institute for Deaf Youth of Paris), also known as Saint Jacques, is a school for the deaf founded by Charles-Michel de l'Épée, in stages, between 1750 and 1760 in Paris, France.

After the death of Père Vanin in 1759, the Abbé de l'Épée was introduced to two deaf girls who were in need of a new instructor. The school began in 1760 and shortly thereafter was opened to the public and became the world's first free school for the deaf. It was originally located in a house at 14 rue des Moulins, butte Saint-Roch, near the Louvre in Paris. On July 29, 1791, the French legislature approved government funding for the school and it was renamed: "Institution Nationale des Sourds-Muets à Paris". In 1794, it was moved to rue Saint Jacques, the site of a seminary, where it still stands.

Prosper Menière was physician from 1838 to his death in 1862. In 1861, Menière reported to the Académie Nationale de Médecine on several of his patients from the school who had experienced vertigo associated with their hearing loss, which formed the controversial basis for his theory that the inner ear was the origin of vertigo.

Following the abolition of the Spanish monarchy in 1931, the Spanish royal family lived in exile in Fontainebleau. Infante Jaime, Duke of Segovia, second son of King Alfonso XIII, completed his education at the Institut National de Jeunes Sourds de Paris. The Duke of Segovia was deaf by age 4 as a result of an inner ear infection as a child.

== Notable students ==
- Ferdinand Berthier
- Laurent Clerc
