= Perkins School for the Blind =

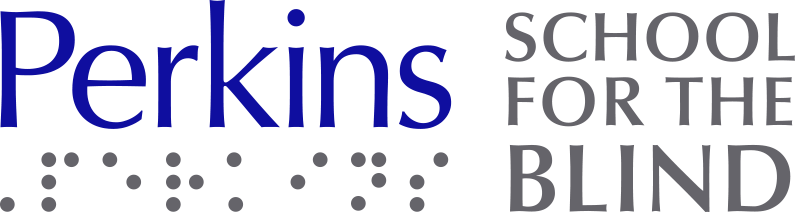

Location
- 175 North Beacon Street; Watertown, Massachusetts 02472; 42.3620°N 71.1755°W

Information
- Founded: 1829; 197 years ago
- President: David Barth
- Campus size: 38 acres (15 ha)
- Website: perkins.org

Perkins School for the Blind, or simply Perkins, is the oldest school for the blind in the United States. It is located in Watertown, Massachusetts and was established in 1829. It was historically known as the Perkins Institution for the Blind.

Perkins manufactures its own Perkins Brailler, which is used to print embossed, tactile books for the blind; and the Perkins SMART Brailler, a braille teaching tool, at the Perkins Solutions division housed within the Watertown campus's former Howe Press. The campus is also home to the Perkins Braille and Talking Book Library and the Howe Innovation Center for accessible technology.

== History ==
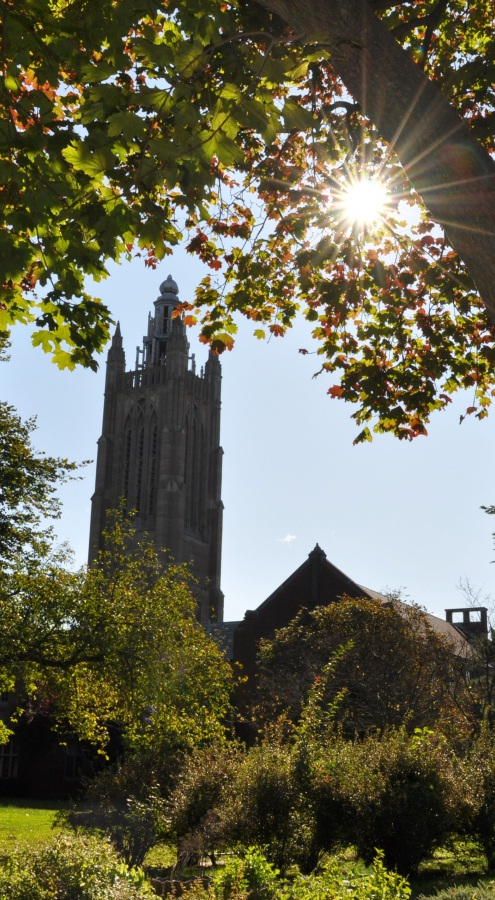
The Howe Building Tower from afar on the campus of the Perkins School for the Blind in Watertown, Massachusetts

Founded in 1829, Perkins was the first school for the blind established in the United States. The school was originally named the New England Asylum for the Blind and was incorporated on March 2, 1829. The name was eventually changed to Perkins School for the Blind. John Dix Fisher first considered the idea of a school for blind children based upon his visits to Paris at the National Institute for the Blind and was inspired to create such a school in Boston, but it was founded by Samuel Gridley Howe, who had also studied education for the blind in Europe.

The school is named in honor of Thomas Handasyd Perkins, one of the organization's incorporators. He was a Boston shipping merchant and slave trader who began losing his sight about the time the school was established. In 1833, the school outgrew its first location, the Pleasant Street house of the father of founder Howe. That year Perkins donated his Pearl Street mansion as the school's second home. In 1839, Perkins sold the mansion and donated the proceeds.

This gift allowed the purchase of a more spacious building in South Boston. In 1885, 6 acres (2.4 ha) were purchased in the Hyde Square section of Jamaica Plain, a residential district of Boston, to build a kindergarten, with Isabel Greeley as its first matron. This property was home to both Laura Bridgman and Helen Keller. The school moved to its present campus, in Watertown, Massachusetts, in the autumn of 1912.

Charles Dickens visited Perkins in 1842 during a lecture tour of America and was amazed at the work Howe was doing with Laura Bridgman, a deaf-blind girl who had come to the school in 1837 from New Hampshire. He wrote about his visit in his book, American Notes.

In 1887, Perkins director Michael Anagnos sent graduate Anne Sullivan to teach Helen Keller at her family's home in Alabama. After working with her pupil at the Keller home, Sullivan returned to Perkins with Keller in 1888, and resided there intermittently until 1893.

In 1917, Perkins assisted in the recovery efforts after the devastating Halifax explosion that damaged the vision of many residents who had been watching the harbor tragedy unfold.

In 1931, Perkins created the Perkins Braille and Talking Book Library (BTBL).

In 1951, David Abraham successfully manufactured the first Perkins Brailler. By 1977, about 100,000 Perkins Braillers had been produced and distributed worldwide.

=== Perkins today ===
In the 21st century, Perkins has expanded its mission online to include resources for families with blind and visually impaired children, and teachers of the visually impaired (TVIs). Perkins has also worked with local partners in Asian countries to host an online community for educators, caregivers and families.

In 2011, Perkins completed construction of the Grousbeck Center for Students and Technology on its 38-acre campus in Watertown. This facility houses accessible technology for people who are blind or visually impaired.

In February 2016, Perkins launched Perkins Access, a team of expert accessibility consultants who partner with organizations across all industries to improve customer experience, employee experience, and brand engagement for all humans, regardless of age, ability, or means of access.

In July 2016, Perkins' "Braille Trail" was completed. It is located along the Charles River across the street from the rest of campus, and is part of the larger Watertown Riverfront Park.

In 2022, Perkins launched the Howe Innovation Center, dedicated to catalyzing and convening the "DisabilityTech" industry, including bringing together startups, investors, people with disabilities, and market experts.

== Perkins International ==
Perkins partners with local groups in 67 countries: schools, universities, NGOs, nonprofits, government agencies, and parent networks—to educate and empower people who are blind, deaf/blind or visually impaired, and who may have additional disabilities. The organization disseminates resources, such as Perkins Braillers, funding, and expertise on the ground in these countries. One such example of this work in the African countries of Tanzania, Uganda and Kenya is Perkins' role in the Kilimanjaro Blind Trust, Inc. (KBT).

Special educators from other countries are also invited to the Watertown campus every year, for an intensive study of blindness and multiple-disability education. They can take back current information to their respective regions.

== Perkins Solutions ==
Perkins Solutions concentrates on a broad array of assistive technology and accessibility assessment, training, and consulting. The range of Perkins Braillers ships to 175 countries and includes the Classic Brailler, the Next Generation Brailler and the Smart Brailler launched in 2012 with text-to-speech output, visual display, and applications for teaching braille. This subsidiary of Perkins also partners with associations for the blind and partially sighted, education ministers and resellers around the globe in an effort to provide accessible equipment—including Perkins Braillers, brailler repair and assistive technology—to all who need it.

== #BlindNewWorld ==
On May 5, 2016, Perkins launched BlindNewWorld, a social change campaign aimed at helping the sighted population to be more inclusive of people who are blind and to make the world more accessible to them.

== National Deaf-Blind Equipment Distribution Program ==
On June 8, 2012, in conjunction with the Helen Keller National Center (HKNC) and the Federal Communications Commission (FCC), Perkins School for the Blind was selected to conduct nationwide outreach for the National Deaf-Blind Equipment Distribution Program (NDBEDP).

Mandated by the 21st Century Communications and Video Accessibility Act (CVAA) and established by the FCC, the NDBEDP will aid individuals with combined vision and hearing loss connect with family, friends and their community by distributing accessible communications technology. Perkins' and partners' outreach campaign to educate people on this program is called iCanConnect. It aims to inform the nearly one million people in the United States with some sort of combined hearing and vision loss on the types of equipment—e.g. screen-enlargement software, video phones and electronic refreshable braille displays—available to them free of charge.

== Affiliations ==
Perkins Braille and Talking Book Library works in conjunction with the National Library Service for the Blind and Physically Handicapped (NLS) at its Watertown chapter.

Perkins has collaborated with the Texas School for the Blind and Visually Impaired on a Web resource called PathsToLiteracy.org, an online hub for information related to literacy for students who are blind or visually impaired, including those with additional disabilities or deafblindness.

Perkins has collaborated with Amy Bower, a blind oceanographer and senior scientist at the Woods Hole Oceanographic Institution, to show students what it's like to be a blind scientist.

The international nonprofit has also worked with the American Foundation for the Blind to ensure that Expanded Core Curriculum (ECC) be taught in mainstream schools.

Perkins is a member of the Council of Schools for the Blind.

== Notable alumni ==
- Laura Bridgman, the first known deafblind person to be formally educated in English
- Cailin Currie, paralympian
- Tony DeBlois, musician and autistic savant
- Don Deignan, historian and disability advocate
- Albert K. Gayzagian, the first former student and the first visually impaired person to be appointed to the Perkins Board of Trustees
- Helen Keller, notable deafblind activist and public figure
- Paul Pena, American singer, songwriter, and guitarist
- Joseph Brown Smith, musician and the first blind graduate of Harvard
- Robert Smithdas, the first deafblind person to earn a master's degree
- Jean Sorel, polyglot educator, lawyer, Radio Haiti host, and the first blind graduate of the State University of Haiti
- Anne Sullivan, teacher of Helen Keller
- Tom Sullivan, singer and writer
- Emilie Poulsson, poet, children's author, and campaigner for early education and the Froebel method in the United States.

== Notable teachers ==
- Sarah M. Dawson Merrill (1843-1899), educator
