= Charles-Michel de l'Épée =

French priest and educator of the deaf (1712–1789)

Abbé Charles-Michel de l'Épée
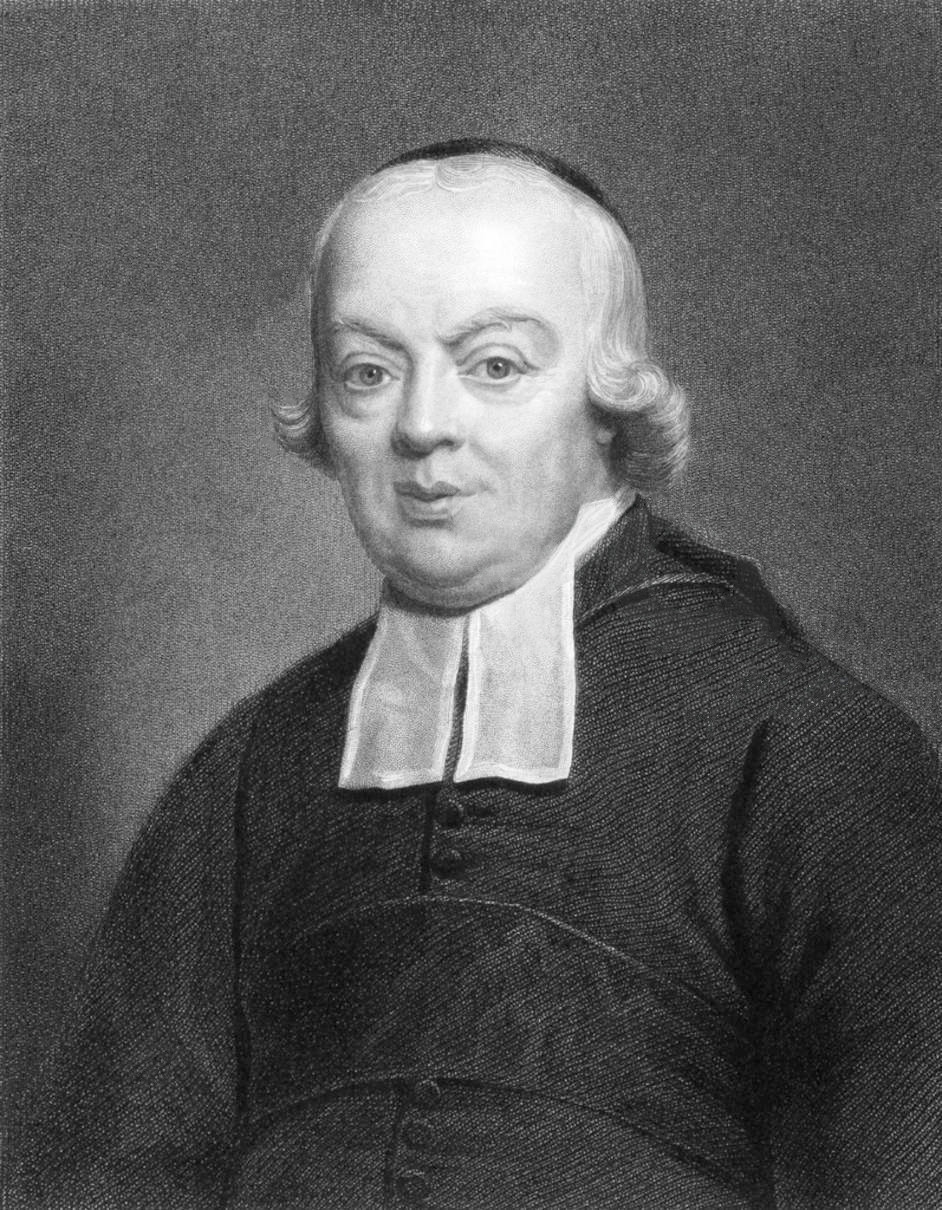
- Born: 24 November 1712; Versailles, Yvelines, France
- Died: 23 December 1789 (aged 77); Paris, France
- Resting place: Saint-Roch, Paris
- Education: Collège des Quatre-Nations, University of Paris
- Known for: Founder of the Institut National de Jeunes Sourds de Paris, the first public school for the deaf

Charles-Michel de l'Épée (French: [ʃaʁlmiʃɛl d(ə) lepe]; 24 November 1712 – 23 December 1789) was an 18th-century French Catholic priest and philanthropic educator who advocated for sign language as the preferred method of teaching deaf people, and has become known as the "Father of the Deaf". He founded the Institut National de Jeunes Sourds de Paris, the first public school for the deaf, in 1760.

== Overview ==
Charles-Michel de l'Épée was born to a wealthy family in Versailles, the seat of political power in what was then the most powerful kingdom of Europe. He studied to be a Catholic priest.

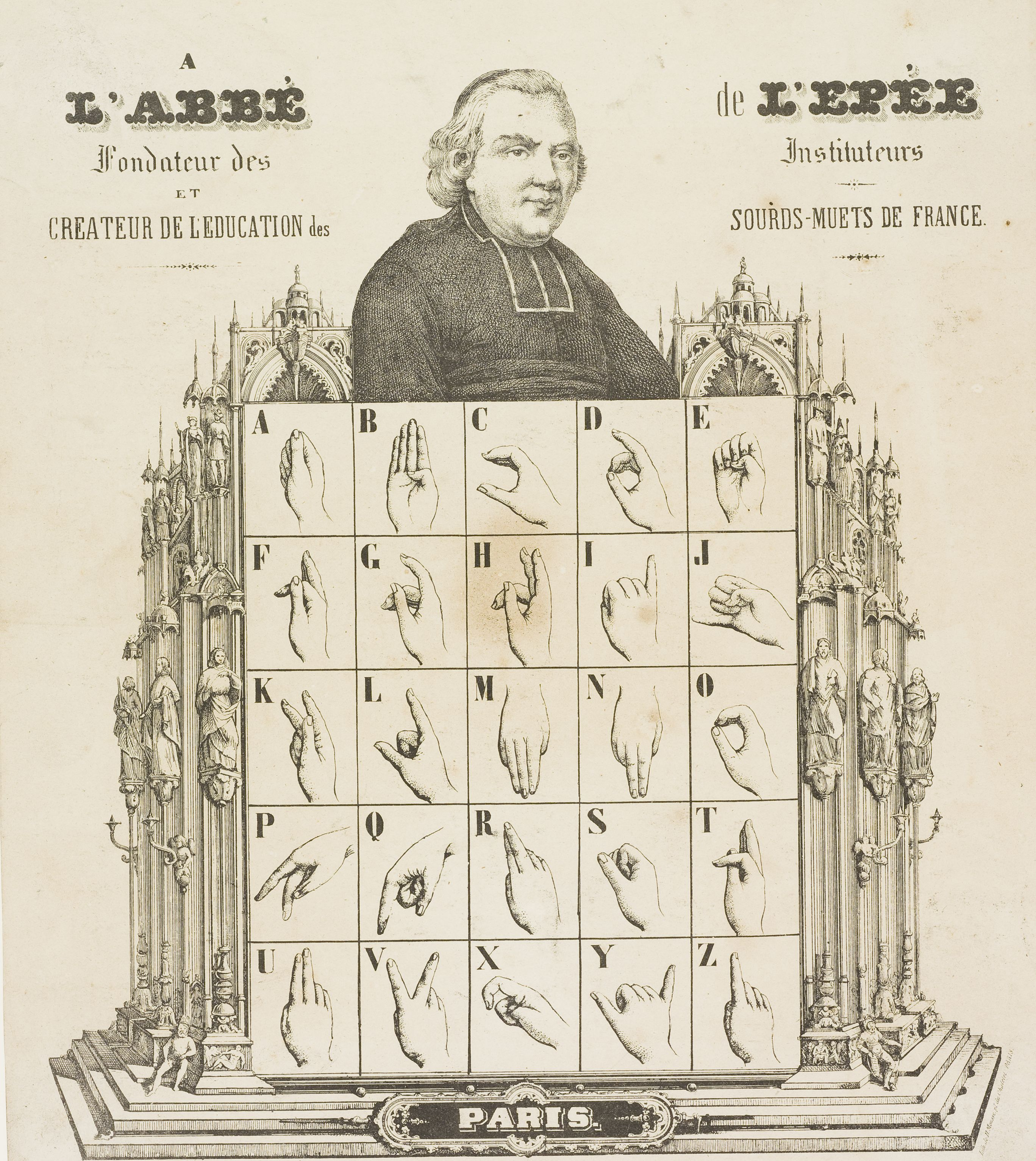
Charles-Michel de l'Épée

L'Épée then turned his attention toward charitable services for the poor, and, on one foray into the slums of Paris, he had a chance encounter with two young deaf sisters who communicated using a sign language. L'Épée decided to dedicate himself to the education of the deaf, and, in 1760, he founded a school. Deaf people were banned by the Catholic Church from receiving communion, but in line with emerging philosophical thought of the time, l'Épée came to believe that deaf people were capable of language and concluded that they should be able to receive the sacraments and thus avoid going to hell. He began to develop a system of instruction of the French language and religion. In the early 1760s, his shelter became the world's first free school for the deaf, open to the public.

Though L'Épée's original interest was in religious education, his public advocacy and development of a kind of "Signed French" enabled deaf people to legally defend themselves in court for the first time.

L'Épée died at the beginning of the French Revolution in 1789, and his tomb is in the Church of Saint Roch in Paris. He was succeeded by Roch-Ambroise Cucurron Sicard, who became the new head of the school.

Two years after L'Épée's death, the National Assembly recognised him as a "Benefactor of Humanity" and declared that deaf people had rights according to the Declaration of the Rights of Man and of the Citizen. In 1791, the Institution Nationale des Sourds-Muets à Paris, which L'Épée had founded, began to receive government funding. It was later renamed the Institut St. Jacques and then renamed again to its present name: Institut National de Jeunes Sourds de Paris. His methods of education have spread around the world, and l'Épée is seen today as one of the founding fathers of deaf education.

== The Instructional Method of Signs (signes méthodiques) ==
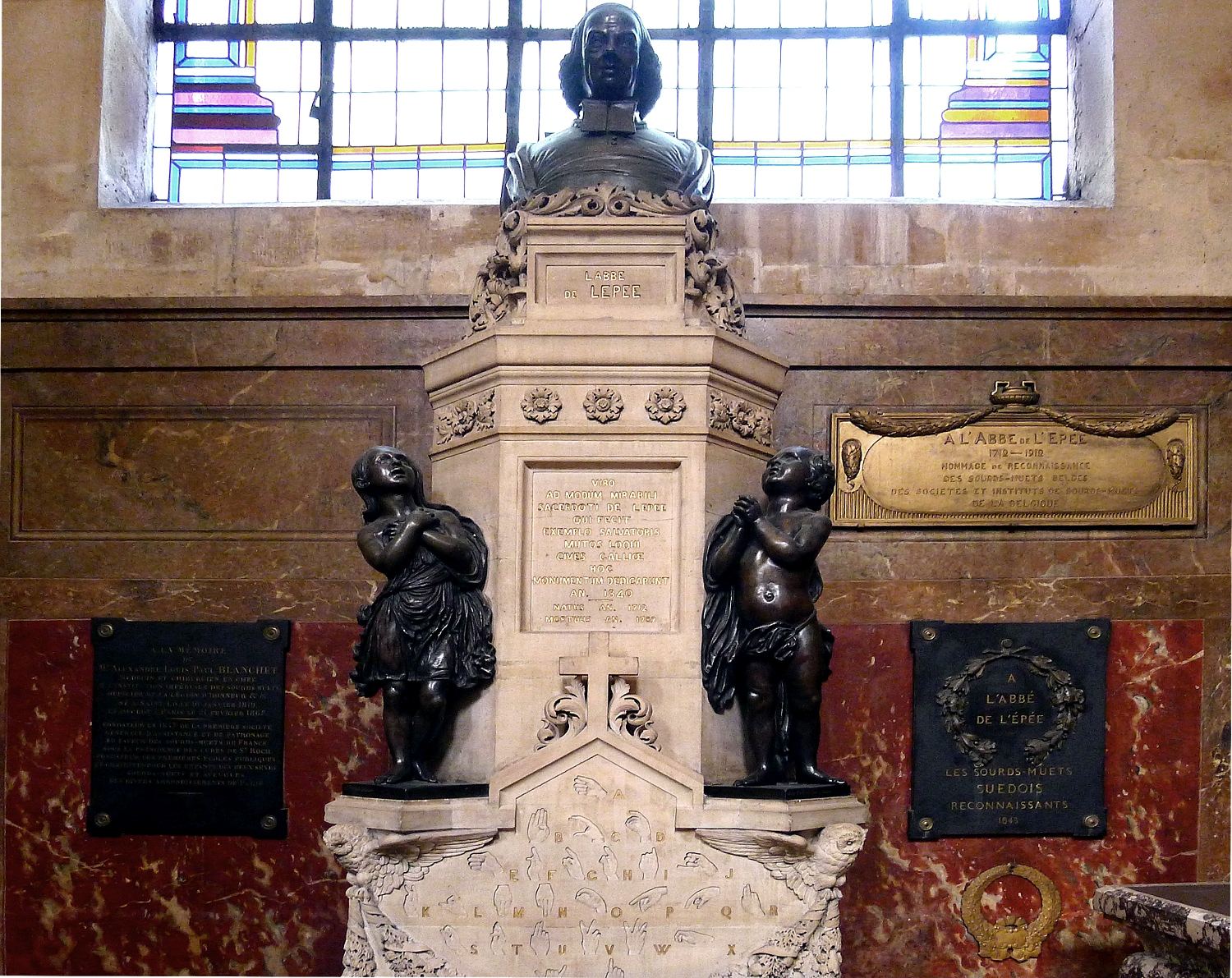
L'Épée's signes méthodiques are represented on his funeral monument in the Church of St. Roch, Paris

The Instructional Method of Signs is an educational method that emphasised using gestures or hand signs, based on the principle that "the education of deaf mutes must teach them through the eye of what other people acquire through the ear." He recognised that there was already a signing deaf community in Paris but saw their language (now known as Old French Sign Language) as primitive. Although he advised his (hearing) teachers to learn the signs (lexicon) for use in instructing their deaf students, he did not use their language in the classroom. Instead, he developed an idiosyncratic gestural system using some of this lexicon, combined with other invented signs to represent all the verb endings, articles, prepositions, and auxiliary verbs of the French language.

In English, L'Épée's system has been known as "Methodical Signs" and "Old Signed French" but is perhaps better translated by the phrase systematised signs. While L'Épée's system laid the philosophical groundwork for the later developments of Manually Coded Languages such as Signed English, it differed somewhat in execution. For example, the word croire ("believe") was signed using five separate signs—four with the meanings "know", "feel", "say", and "not see" and one that marked the word as a verb (Lane, 1980:122). The word indéchiffrable ("unintelligible") was also produced with a chain of five signs: interior-understand-possible-adjective-not. However, like Manually Coded Languages, L'Épée's system was cumbersome and unnatural to deaf signers. A deaf pupil of the school (and later teacher), Laurent Clerc, wrote that the deaf never used the signes méthodiques for communication outside the classroom, preferring their own community language (French Sign Language).

Although L'Épée reportedly had great success with this educational method, his successes were questioned by critics who thought his students were aping his gestures rather than understanding the meaning.

== Educational legacy ==
At the time of l'Épée's death, there were six schools established around France for deaf children and by 1866, there were fifty-four – all using sign language as the mode of instruction.

What distinguished L'Épée from educators of the deaf before him, and ensured his place in history, is that he allowed his methods and classrooms to be available to the public and other educators. As a result of his openness as much as his successes, his methods would become so influential that their mark is still apparent in deaf education today. L'Épée also established teacher-training programmes for foreigners who would take his methods back to their countries and who established numerous deaf schools around the world. Laurent Clerc, a deaf pupil of the Paris school, went on to co-found the first school for the deaf in North America and brought with him the sign language that formed the basis of modern American Sign Language (ASL), including the signs of the ASL alphabet.

Some deaf schools in Germany and the UK that were contemporaries of the Abbé de l'Épée's Paris School used an oralist approach emphasising speech and lip reading, in contrast to his belief in manualism. Their methods were closely guarded secrets, and they saw Épée as a rival. The oralism vs. manualism debate still rages to this day. Oralism is sometimes called the German method, and manualism the French method in reference to those times.

The Paris school still exists, though it now uses French Sign Language in class rather than Épée's methodical signs. Located in rue Saint-Jacques in Paris, it is one of four national deaf schools—the others being in Metz, Chambéry, and Bordeaux.

== Myths ==
Even now, L'Épée is commonly described as the inventor of sign language or as having "taught the deaf to sign". In fact, he was taught to sign by the deaf. L'Épée categorised and recorded French signs so they could be taught to others in order to be used in education, especially about the Christian faith.

== Tribute ==
On 24 November 2018, Google Doodle commemorated his 306th birthday.

== Published works ==
- — (1776). Institution des sourds et muets, par la voie des signes méthodiques [Deaf mute Institution, by Means of Systematic Signs] (in French). Nyon l'ainé.
- — (1784). La véritable manière d'instruire les sourds et muets, confirmée par une longue expérience [The true manner of instructing the deaf and mute, confirmed by long experience] (in French). Paris: Nyon l'aîné. "L'Ouvrage que je présente au Public n'est proprement qu'une seconde édition de celui qui a paru en 1776, sous ce titre : Institution des Sourds et Muets, par la voie des Signes méthodiques, & dont il ne reste plus d'exemplaires. The work which I present to the public is nothing other than a second edition of the one which came out in 1776 under the title 'Institution des Sourds et Muets, par la voie des Signes méthodiques', which is completely sold out."
- He also began a Dictionnaire général des signes, which was completed by his successor, Roch-Ambroise Cucurron Sicard.

== See also ==
- List of Roman Catholic scientist-clerics
