= Deafness in Italy =

Out of nearly 59 million people in Italy, about 3.5 million Italians have some form of hearing loss. Among them, around 70,000 people are severely deaf. The European Union for the Deaf reports that the majority of the deaf people in Italy use Italian Sign Language (LIS). LIS has been an official sign language in Italy since 2021. Italy, among other countries, ratified the Convention on the Rights of Persons with Disabilities (CRPD) and is slowly improving conditions for deaf humans in Italy. Many major organizations in Italy fight for deaf rights and spread awareness to the Italian National Agency for the protection and assistance of the Deaf (ENS, Ente Nazionale Sordimuti) and Associated Italian Families for the Defense of the Rights of Deaf and Hard of Hearing Individuals (FIADDA). Newborns in Italy also receive universal hearing screenings. Education in Italy is directed towards oralism, although sign language is also used. LIS is a stable language and is used by approximately 40,000 users in Italy.

== Language emergence ==
Deaf people in Italy use Italian Sign Language (lingua dei segni italiana, LIS). Other common terms used for Italian Sign Language include lingua dei gesti (language of the gestures) and lingua dei sordi (language of the deaf). LIS is influenced by and shares similarities with French Sign Language. This happened because a deaf educator, Tommaso Silvestri, in 1784 brought over the French gesture system to Italy and started teaching it to children.

Italian Sign Language came to be through convergence. The deaf community in Italy lacked a form of communication and thus developed LIS through influences of French Sign Language. LIS can be quite different in various parts of Italy. For example, the signing of "shoes" is different regionally and sometimes can be traced to a certain school. In particular, one school, "Guilio Tarra" that was famous for its oralist education, signed "shoes" in a unique way "likely as the result of speech therapy sessions held at the school". LIS is best characterized as a deaf-community sign language, as mostly only deaf people in Italy know it.

== Significant organizations ==
=== Italian National Agency for the Deaf ===
The Italian National Agency for the protection and assistance of the Deaf (ENS, Ente Nazionale Sordimuti) was the result of the unification of the Federazione Italiana delle Associazioni per i Sordomuti (FIAS) and the Union Sordomuti Italiani (USI), established in 1932. They are a part of the World Federation of the Deaf and the European Union of the Deaf. ENS operates with "103 provincial Sections, 21 Regional Councils and over 50 inter-municipal representations".

ENS was started by Antonio Magarotto. His son, Cesare Magarotto, created the World Federation of the Deaf. Antonio Magarotto was born in Italy and became deaf at three years old due to meningitis. He studied at the Piarist Fathers' T. Pendola Institute for the Deaf. In 1932, Magaarotto and his friends formed the Italian National Agency for the Deaf, where he served as president from 1932 to 1950. During his lifetime, he devoted himself to becoming a voice for deaf students. He also founded in Padua the First National Institute of Middle and Higher Education for the Deaf. Magarotto also received an honorary doctorate in humanities from the Gallaudet University of Washington.

The members can vote and have governance roles. ENS also plans cultural and sporting activities and events for all members. The local branches hold sign language courses. They also have training for interpreters in bigger cities as well as job-finding aid. ENS is active on several social media platforms and also posts articles regarding their activity, such as "ENS at the Congress of the Italian Linguistics Society".

Overall, ENS plays a big role in the deaf community by "promoting the integration of deaf people into society" as well as focusing on areas "such as legislation, education and employment."

=== Mason Perkins Deafness Fund ===
This organization fights to create a positive environment for deaf and deaf-blind children in Italy by promoting LIS and deaf culture. They are a non-profit organization founded in 1985 by Elena Radutzky, an American researcher who studied Italian Sign Language, with funding from Mason Perkins. MPDF creates and provides cultural events, educational material such as children's books in LIS, training, and networking events. This organization directed the Dictionary of Italian Sign Language (1992) and also broadened educational opportunities for Italian deaf students through scholarships.

=== Associated Italian Families for the Defense of the Rights of Deaf and Hard of Hearing Individuals (FIADDA) ===
The association was started on May 6, 1991, and changed names over the years. The parents in this association focus on oralism for their deaf children as one of their fundamental values. They highly encourage integration through oralism because "a verbal language is much more useful and functional for the deaf person". They believe that sign language is not an official language and, because of its variety in nature, should be a second choice as compared to oralism. They also provide support for families with hard-of-hearing individuals. They do so by creating seminars and courses for schools focused on how to teach rehabilitation oralism. The organization focuses on accessibility for deaf individuals in terms of having oralism resources and subtitles in media.

=== CODA (Children of Deaf Adults) Social Promotion Association ===
This social promotion association was started in 2014 with the goal of "giving recognition to hearing children of deaf parents" in Italy. The international CODA organization was started in 1983 by Millie Brother, a graduate of Gallaudet University and also a hearing CODA, in America. The idea was to create a space where children could meet others with similar experiences between translating LIS and speaking. Non-Codas are also welcome to join as supporting members but cannot be voting members.

The organization is involved in various activities, such as gatherings where they share experiences and the management of relationships between deaf parents and children. They promote sign language through courses and activities, along with research in collaboration with other associations and universities regarding the relationship dynamics of children of deaf adults. Over the summer, they provide camps for deaf and hard-of-hearing CODA "to promote integration and inclusion" as well as scholarships for higher education. Overall, the CODA association aims to share and explore their "bilingual-bicultural heritage".

=== GPODHH (Global Coalition of Parents of Children who are Deaf or Hard of Hearing) ===
The Global Coalition of Parents of Children who are Deaf or Hard of Hearing was formed in 2008 in Como, Italy, at the NHS 2008: Beyond Newborn Hearing Screening Conference by a small group of parents from the United States, Australia, and Italy. They aim to improve the system and practices to encourage informed choice and the empowerment of families with deaf or hard-of-hearing children. There are several member organizations, one of them being Dai Genitori ai Genitori in Italy. The association in Italy is mainly a blog page that was last updated in 2015. Other member organizations have websites that provide information to families whose children are deaf or hard of hearing in their respective countries. GPODHH provides the perspective of parents of children who are deaf or hard of hearing at a number of international forums, including the World Hearing Forum and CIICA, and is a member of the Advisory Committee reviewing and updating "Best Practices in Family-Centred Early Intervention for Children who are Deaf or Hard of Hearing: An International Consensus Statement".

== Human/Civil rights ==
=== Official recognition of LIS ===
Italian Sign Language was officially recognized by the Italian parliament on May 19, 2021, as part of a coronavirus relief bill that recognized, promoted, and would protect LIS and LISt (Italian Tactile Sign Language). This meant the official acknowledgement of LIS interpreters as professions and the spread of LIS in government offices.

=== Convention on the Rights of Persons with Disabilities ===
The UN Convention on the Rights of Persons with Disabilities is an agreement between countries and the United Nations to protect the rights of persons with disabilities. Italy ratified the CRPD on 15 May. Italy is also signed up for an optional protocol, meaning it will create a structure for accountability to happen. Each country has to submit a report regarding how they are implementing the rights in the CRPD policy document. The UN will create a "list of issues" with civilian input that will be sent to Italy, which Italy wil respond to in the state party report. In the document "Info from Civil Society Organizations", the authors point out gaps in the state report as well as priorities and resolutions. This document was made by several organizations that fight for disability rights, including ENS, and is part of the CRPD documents.

The first and last CRPD report submitted by Italy was one 21 January 2013, and it was due on 15 June 2011. Within the state report, Italy states in regard to DDH rights that they have acknowledged and promoted sign language in law 104/92, along with professional training of support teachers. However, the formal recognition of LIS is currently still in process (a report was submitted prior to the official recognition of LIS in 2021).

=== World Federation of the Deaf ===
The World Federation of the Deaf lists on its website important CRPD articles for DHH individuals. It also lists goals that are important in order to increase human rights for deaf people.

Mentions in the state report specifically regarding deaf rights include:

- Article 21.b of the CPRD was acknowledged through Article 21 of the Constitution, which gives freedom of expression "through oral words, written texts or any other instrument".
- The state report does mention that Law 244/07 has extended the exemption of payment of license tax on mobile phones to deaf people.
- They also state that "full participation of deaf people in social life" is still in discussion in Parliament.
- As regards having "reasonable accommodation in the workplace" the report says that although legally there is no obligation to have reasonable accommodations in Italy, Article 2 of Law 68/99 talks about issues regarding work environment and relations and "therefore can be considered as a form of reasonable accommodation".

CRPD Articles and Goals that were not mentioned in the state report:

- Article 2: makes it clear that sign language is equal in status to spoken language.
- 24.1: Requires the government to ensure an inclusive education system at all levels.
- 24.4: Requires teachers of deaf children to be qualified in sign language.
- Goal 4.5: eliminate gender disparities.
- Goal 11.2, 11.7: providing accessible transport and universal access to safe spaces.

Points made in regard to deaf rights from "Info from Civil Society Organizations":

- Lack of provision of reasonable accommodation in other areas of life other than employment.
- Make the qualifications of school staff include students with disabilities; persons with disabilities have a lower level of education compared to the general public.
- Article 24, Education: The state report does not mention if accessibility requirements are in schools of any level, how quality of education is assessed, how continuity of teaching is ensured, or how enrollment of teachers with disabilities is promoted, not only allowed.
- Data collection on deaf people is through telephone interviews, which will cause data to be undermined.

=== Milan conference ===
The Milan conference happened in Italy in 1880 during the Second International Congress on Education of the Deaf in Milan, where they banned the usage of sign language in schools. Out of 164 delegates, only one, James Denison, principal of Kendall School in Washington, DC, was deaf. This created a split in the history of LIS. Prior to 1880, deaf children were educated using signs or received bilingual education, meaning they would learn both LIS and varying degrees of written and oral. After the ban on sign language in 1880, schools strictly focused on oralism. This causes deaf teachers to lose their jobs and creates a decrease in deaf professionals in Italy.

Italian Sign Language was able to survive despite that ban because students were signing outside of school.

== Early hearing detection and intervention ==
=== Detection ===
In a nationwide survey done in 2018, 95.3% of newborns received hearing tests. The universal newborn hearing screening has been mandatory in Tuscany, Italy, since 2007. Over time, other regions also adopted these guidelines. Each region uses different methodologies and has different results. The guidelines have also been updated over the years.

The UNHS program in Tuscany and most regions is separated into three levels:

1. public and private birth points that can do TEOAE testing (Transient Evoked Otoacoustic Emissions). This test can be done by trained nursing personnel, neonatologists and audiometrists.
2. audiology services; usually in middle and large hospitals, TEOAE and Automated Auditory Brainstem Responses (A-ABR) are performed by audiometrists, pediatricians, audiologists, and otolaryngologists.
3. Regional Reference Centers that can perform whole clinical and audiological evaluations in children, including TEOAE, DPOAE (distortion product otoacoustic emissions), and ABR (Auditory Brainstem Responses). They can also do a complete diagnosis of hearing loss and activate rehabilitation for children.

According to the screening process designed by DASOE, all birth points must screen newborns during spontaneous sleep and before hospital discharge. Infants who pass will leave, and infants who don't will be re-examined within the first month with TEOAE. If the result is still not passing, the newborn will be sent to be tested at level 2 (audiology services), and if it is still not passing, it will be sent within the third month to level 3 (the regional reference center) for a definitive diagnosis and to start rehabilitation no later than the sixth month of life. Infants who pass but have risk factors for late-onset hearing loss will be sent to level 2 centers and reassessed every 6–12 months for the first three years. Some risk factors include family history, syndromes that are associated with hearing loss, low birth weight, and meningitis. Through surveys, it is still evident that many children are lost in between rescreenings.

=== Intervention ===
After a child is diagnosed with hearing problems, there is not much support or protocol given. Counseling services are rare, and professionals direct children towards oral education. The Italian legislation encourages children to integrate into mainstream schools, but sign language is not encouraged. However, there is some support available from the following organizations:

- FIADDA gives useful links and directions to reference centers that are responsible for carrying out cochlear implants.
- Free batteries from the Regional Council started in 2009 for hearing aids for Tuscan citizens, regardless of age or condition. Hearing aid repair is also available through the Regional Council.
- The Hearing Loss Desk provides information on hearing aids, including how to obtain communication and frequency in Prato, according to Fiadda Tuscany and ENS.
- FIADDA Toscana answers questions regarding school support, applications, tax breaks, and law services.
- Famiglie al Centro is a project by ENS and managed by the European Union of the Deaf. The project's goal is to bring deaf youth closer to reading and to raise awareness of this topic among families. They have partnered with Huawei to make an app called StorySign that translates children's books into LIS.

== Language deprivation ==
Language deprivation is the lack of consistent, accessible language input in the early years of life. In Italy, about 1 in 1000 people are affected by hearing loss. About 95% of deaf children are born into hearing families, and about 5% are born to deaf parents. Hearing families often want their children to attend mainstream schools that encourage cochlear implants and integration. Almost all residential and special schools for the deaf are closed except for bilingual/bimodel experimental schools. Only a small number of deaf children have LIS as their first language, and only deaf children of deaf parents have been exposed to sign language since birth. Deaf children born into hearing families rarely have early access to sign language, although they may acquire it later on.

In studies done regarding the impact of hearing aids and cochlear implants, it is evident that children who were able to be exposed to language had a significant change in language skills. Behavioral problems were also known to be a cause of language deprivation, or poor language development as the lack of being able to understand and express led to interferences with emotions, social rules, and interactions. 30%–50% of profoundly hearing-loss children with or without hearing aids exhibited behavioral problems. Children who had access to language through cochlear implants showed similar levels of behavioral problems as their normal hearing classmates.

== Primary and secondary education ==
Families with deaf children often have to move in order for their children to attend bilingual or deaf schools. There are bilingual and bimodel experimental programs that exist in Italy. Istituto Statale dei Sordi in Rome (also known as the Tommaso Silvestri–ISISS Magarotto School), Scuola per i'infanzia Statale in Cossato, and Istituto comprensivo Santini in Noventa Padovana are all examples of bilingual programs that are present in Italy. Bilingual curriculums use both Italian and LIS. LIS is also an individual class, lasting from 1 hour to a maximum of 6 hours per week. In places like Palermo, Guidonia, and Cossato, LIS is a second language course for hearing students.

Deaf children who do not take part in special programs do not have automatic access to interpreters during school. They may only have access to a communication assistant and teachers who aren't guaranteed to know sign language. In cases where deaf children have a communication assistant/TA who is competent in LIS, the child will receive individual explanations in LIS for 20 hours a week. However, the rest of the curriculum will be provided in spoken Italian. This is the case when there is only one deaf child in a class of hearing children.

The government provides support through three branches: the Second Teacher, the Communication Assistant, and speech therapy. The Second Teacher works like a translator within the school system, providing what the teacher is saying to the deaf student. Communication Assistants work in the classroom as well as in homes and other services provided by the state. They work based on contracts and often overlap with Second Teachers. Speech therapy is offered by the country to families as well.

In order to qualify as a support teacher, there is a required number of hours of LIS training provided by the Ministry for Public Instruction. There are also projects focused on training deaf people to become communication instructors. At nursery and elementary schools, the assistants working are often deaf.

== Higher education ==
According to a study done at the Institute for the Deaf of Turin, the enrollment of deaf and hard of hearing students in universities in Turin, Italy, has increased for the past 15 years. The three universities of Turin (University of Turin, Polytechnic of Turin, and Albertina Academy of Fine Arts) enroll between 25 and 35 deaf and hard-of-hearing students each year. They have counted a total of 81 deaf students at the University of Turin since 2000. Most deaf students obtain a degree in education, and out of the 22 deaf students who graduated, ten received a bachelor's degree, four completed a master's degree, seven are currently enrolled in a master's degree, and only one obtained a second-level master's degree. Overall, there are only a few students with master's degrees and no PhD candidates.

In universities, interpreters are provided at some institutions to deaf signers. Deaf and hard-of-hearing students are also entitled to individual lesson plans and special support, such as tutoring. After enrollment in a university, the student has to apply for service at a disability office, and after an interview, an individual plan is designed and signed by the school for the student. The office will have a set number of hours of tutoring and interpreting, as well as other services the student will need. The students are assigned to a mentor who specializes in deaf and hard-of-hearing studies and education.

Current issues with education in Italy are the dropout rate and the availability of tutorship hours. As the number of deaf students increases each year, the hours each student receives of tutorship decreases due to a reduced amount of resources for the education sector set by the national spending review policy. Out of 81 deaf students enrolled, 34 have dropped out, which accounts for one-third of the total enrolled. One main issue stated in the study that results in dropout is discontinuity. Deaf students lack proper guidance in programs and switch between majors, causing deaf students on average to spend more years to complete university. The study also states that while the UNCRPD wants state parties to create a universally accessible environment, universities are too focused on individual special support.

== Employment ==
The government requires companies with 15–35 employees to hire at least one individual with a disability. In return, employers are able to receive tax subsidies, wage contributions, and reimbursement for workplace adaptations. 44% of persons with disabilities from 15 to 64 were employed, in contrast to 55.1% of the total population employed at the same age.

Bar Senza Nome: Only deaf-owned and deaf-employee-worked bar in Italy. It was started in 2012 by two deaf guys, Sara and Alfonso. They obtain beer through a deaf brewer and offer LIS lessons in the store.

OneSense by Valla: Deaf-owned restaurant that opened in 2018. The restaurant is also run by deaf staff and hearing cooks. The owner, Valeria Olivotti, wanted to create a restaurant where there are no barriers between deaf customers and workers. She wanted to show people that a restaurant with both deaf and hearing staff could work together in unity.

== Healthcare ==
Deaf and hard-of-hearing people often lack access to healthcare and information. During the COVID-19 pandemic in Italy, the deaf community was not able to access a lot of the information provided to hearing people. Usually, information is given orally or in written format. However, in Italy, LIS interpreting has only been granted for news programs. During prior press releases given by the Prime Minister, the videos were subtitled but not interpreted in LIS. The Deaf community and the ENS had to lobby and fight for interpreting services in LIS for the head of the government's releases. Although the press releases were interpreted afterwards due to the cameraman's choice of aesthetics, they decided not to capture the interpreter and only focused on the Prime Minister. The deaf community protested, and since then, TV channels have modified the interpreters windows, and all meetings of the Deputy's Chamber have been translated into LIS. Thus, when the prime minister delivered a speech on the coronavirus, it was also translated into LIS by two interpreters. During the lockdown in Italy, the deaf community also started using visual ICT tools to spread information to decrease the reliance on interpreting and subtitles. The spread of information during the coronavirus was due to the work of the deaf community lobbying and creating resources for each other.

Deaf people also have significant difficulties communicating with health professions due to a lack of access to sign language interpreters as well as a lack of training and awareness among professionals. A study done on a systematic review that involved a 2% sample in Italy shows the interventions that can happen in healthcare that will decrease the gap. The most essential factor in achieving equitable care for deaf people is having a sign language interpreter present. It is not clear if Italian hospitals provide interpreters or not. Cultural sensitivity and non-judgmental care were also big factors for deaf patients. Education programs and online health interventions were also identified as ways to spread information and reach deaf people effectively. In total, there were seven main interventions, as the studies point out. Based on the review, two major messages came out. The first is the importance of technology. The researchers believe technology can greatly improve communication between providers and patients. The second is that it is important to involve deaf communities as contributors in all steps of intervention design and implementation.

== Language preservation and revitalization ==
The European Union of the Deaf (EUD) reports that LIS has around 40,000 users. LIS is on an EGIDS scale of 5–6a, as the language is not being sustained by formal institutions, but it is still the norm in the home and community that all children learn and use the language.

The Italian government recognized LIS as an official language in 2021, and it is taught, although the government and society lean towards oralism. LIS interpretation is also available in new reports, major government press releases, and videos. Various LIS dictionaries exist. Deaf organizations such as ENS also provide LIS videos and instructions for children and adults.

== See also ==
- Deafness in Poland
- Deafness in France
