= Comitato Giovani Sordi Italiani =

Italian non-governmental organization

- Founded: May 14, 1994; 32 years ago
- Type: Non-governmental organization
- Purpose: Human, civil, and linguistic rights of Deaf people.
- Headquarters: Rome, Italy
- Location: Rome, Via Gregorio VII, 120
- Coordinates: 41.8955169°N 12.444349°E
- Region served: Italy
- Members: 400
- President: Gianluca Grioli
- Vice President: Susanna Ricci Bitti
- Main organ: Board
- Affiliations: World Federation of the Deaf - Youth Section, European Union of the Deaf Youth
- Website: cgsi.ens.it

The Comitato Giovani Sordi Italiani (CGSI) (Italian Deaf Youth Committee) is an Italian non-governmental organization that acts as a peak body for national associations of Deaf people, with a focus on Deaf young people who use sign language and their family and friends. CGSI aims to promote the Human Rights of Deaf Youngs Italians, by working closely with the Italy. CGSI is also a member of the World Federation of the Deaf - Youth Section (WFDYS) and European Union of the Deaf Youth (EUDY).

== History ==
The CGSI was established on 14 May 1994 in Aosta, Italy, at the first meeting of the Deaf young Italians, under the auspices of Gruppi Giovanili Sordomuti of the Ente Nazionale Sordi, the Italian Deaf Association. The first president of CGSI was Francesco Piccigallo.

== Presidents ==
- Francesco Piccigallo (1992–1994)
- Vannina Vitale (1994–1996)
- Riccardo Ferracuti (1996–2001)
- Beatrice D'Aversa (2001–2003)
- Roberto Petrone (2003–2007)
- Raffaele Cagnazzo (2007–2011)
- Laura Caporali (2011–2013)
- Antonio Ciavarelli (2013–2014)
- Gianteodoro Pisciottani (2014–2016)
- Katia Bugè (2016–2018)
- Gianluca Grioli (2018–)

== See also ==
- Ente Nazionale Sordi
- European Union of the Deaf
- World Federation of the Deaf
- International Sign
- List of sign languages
