= Disabled Women Ireland =

National representative organization

- Abbreviation: DWI
- Founded: May 11th, 2018
- Purpose: Disability advocacy
- Region served: Ireland
- Services: Social Space Access; Support Groups; Network of disabled women and gender-diverse people
- Methods: Disability advocacy; Community outreach; Research; Education
- Members: 200+
- Co-Director(s): Nem Kearns, Amy Hassett
- Treasurer: Gillian Kearns
- Board of directors: Grace Murphy, Roisin Dermody, Aoife Price
- Affiliations: DPO Network; Access Europe
- Website: Official Disabled Women Ireland Website

Disabled Women Ireland (DWI) is an Irish disabled-led national representative organization that advocates for the equal participation, rights, inclusion, and community network for disabled Irish women, non-binary, trans, genderqueer, and gender nonconforming individuals.

DWI's work is led by a steering group and seven all-volunteer working groups. The steering group consists of executive members and working group representatives. Working groups meet every 6 to 8 weeks.

In response to the Eighth Amendment referendum, DWI was founded in 2018 by Maria Ní Fhlartharta, Roisin Dermody, Alannah Murray, Amy Hassett, Niamh Herbert, Eleanor Walshe, Roísin Hackett, and Roísin Hackett from a community group on Twitter. According to Ní Fhlartharta, they were inspired to create the organisation because they "were ridiculously annoyed by absolutely everything the Pro-Life campaign said – and said about disability in particular – but then also kind of annoyed at the progressive feminists’ response, if that makes sense... We were like oh, no one is getting this right and we realised that the conversation [about disabled women] wasn’t happening.” The organisation built upon the models of Sisters of Frida (England), tabú (Iceland), and Women with Disabilities Australia.

== Membership ==
DWI has over 200 members. People have to self-identify as disabled or as a person with a disability and as a woman, non-binary, genderqueer, trans person, or as a member of a marginalized gender identity. All disabilities and impairments are included.

== Activism ==
=== Policy ===
DWI contributed to and provided feedback on domestic legislation relating to disabled people, women, sexual violence, trans and non-binary people, and intersectional legislation. In 2022, DWI spoke to both the Joint Oireachtas Committee on Disability Matters and the Committee on Finance, Public Expenditure and Reform along with the Taoiseach on the subject of “Enabling Financial Independence for Disabled Women." They would also submit a statement in 2023 to Group of Experts on Action against Violence against Women and Domestic Violence (GREVIO) on Ireland and the Istanbul Convention and to the Irish government on Education for Persons with Special Educational Needs Act 2004.

We cannot begin to dismantle the pervasive and enduring experience of economic marginalisation and social exclusion endured by disabled women without fully recognising that their lives are equally shaped by both gender and disability, and that the barriers confronting them arise from this interaction. Policies and strategies which fail to specifically address what the CRPD Committee has referred to as the “multiple and intersecting forms of discrimination” faced by disabled women, girls and other gender minorities will continue to fail them, and continue to leave them vulnerable and on the margins of society. With socio-economic inequalities continuing to grow for disabled women, it is clear that focused efforts are needed to address gendered barriers as a core part of implementing the CRPD.
... In fact, inequalities highlighted here are further exacerbated for disabled people belonging to other marginalised communities - such as Traveller and other ethnic minority or LGBTQIA+ communities - and for those living in institutional settings, including in the Direct Provision and penal systems.

— Disabled Women Ireland, Opening Statement to the Joint Oireachtas Committee on Disability Matters and the Committee on Finance, Public Expenditure and Reform, and Taoiseach

=== Communication ===
In 2021, DWI published a series of essays from members in their #DisabilityIsntADirtyWord series. In July through November 2026, DWI, Disability Participation News Hub, and Coimisiún na Meán ran a free series, Access Media, on disabled representation and disabled-led media opportunities in Ireland.

=== Accessibility ===
DWI compiled accessible locations across Dublin and Wexford on their website. The ongoing, member-compiled Access Social addresses the wheelchair accessibility, availability of accessible toilets, and sensory inputs or triggers in each location.

=== DPO Network ===
DWI co-founded the Disabled Persons' Organisations (DPO) Network with four other Irish disabled-led organisations: AsIAm, Independent Living Movement Ireland, Irish Deaf Society, and National Platform of Self Advocates. A key principle of DPO Network is co-creation with disabled communities, citing that "Through Article 4.3 of the CRPD, the Convention says the State must actively involve both DPOs and individuals with lived experience expertise."

In 2021, DWI along with the DPO Network, Voice of Vision Impairment, and Disability Equality Specialist Support Agency (DESSA) submitted a Shadow Report to the UN Committee on the Rights of Persons with Disabilities.

== Publications ==
- Disabled Women Ireland (January 2023), Price, Aoife (ed.), Submission to the Group of Experts on Action against Violence against Women and Domestic Violence on Ireland's Compliance with the Istanbul Convention (PDF), Ireland: Council of Europe
- Disabled Women Ireland (March 2023), Submission on the Education of Persons with Special Educational Needs (EPSEN) Act 2004 (PDF)
- AsIAm; Disabled Women Ireland; Independent Living Movement Ireland; Irish Deaf Society; National Platform of Self Advocates (November 2025), Blueprint for Co-creation Disabled Persons' Organisations (DPO) Network (PDF), DPO Network Position Paper No. 2, Ireland
- Disabled Women Ireland (3 March 2026), "Submission to Joint Oireachtas Committee on Disability Matters on the Disability (Amendments) Act 2025" (PDF), Pre-Legislative Scrutiny of the General Scheme of the Disability (Amendment) Bill 2025
