= Magarotto =

Magarotto is a surname. Notable people with the surname include:

- Alfredo Magarotto (1927–2021), Italian Roman Catholic bishop
- Antonio Magarotto (1891–1966), Italian educator, founder of the Ente Nazionale Sordi and rector of the Padua Deaf institute
- Cesare Magarotto (1917–2006), one of the founders of World Federation of the Deaf and its first General Secretary
