= Deafness in Poland =

Poland has a recorded history of DHH (deaf or hard of hearing) people dating back to 1817. About 15.1% of Polish people in Poland say they have hearing loss. Polski Język Migowy (PJM, transl. Polish Sign Language) is the main signed language in Poland.

== Language emergence ==
Instytut Głuchoniemych (transl. Institute for the Deaf), a PJM school was founded in 1817 by Jakub Falkowski. Polish Sign Language was influenced by the Old French Sign Language and German Sign Language, using a one-handed alphabet. Piotr Gąsowski was the first Deaf person to learn PJM from his teacher Jakub Falkowski. Piotr Gąsowski did not use sign language before Jakub met him. Jakub was educated in Old French Sign Language and German Sign Language, thus influencing Polish Sign Language. PJM has the characteristics of a Deaf community sign language. It was officially recognised by the Polish government in 2011.

There is an alternate sign language, System Językowo-Migowy (SJM, transl. Signed Polish) which is manually coded from Polish. It is often used by interpreters and teachers.

== Deaf-led organizations ==
=== Polish Association of the Deaf ===
The Polish Association of the Deaf was founded in 1946 and has operated continuously since then. Its main goal is to bring the Deaf and hard of hearing community together and give them the support they need. The Polish Association of the Deaf is a privately run NGO but receives monetary support from the government. The board consists of 9 members, 7 of whom are Deaf. In May 2016, they began a project that aimed to provide professional activation for 160 Deaf Polish people (graduates of school for the Deaf in Poland). The members continue today to push for greater equality between the Deaf and hearing communities in Poland. The organisation is part of The European Union of the Deaf and the World Federation of the Deaf.

=== Polish Deaf Sports Association ===
The Polish Deaf Sports Association was founded in 1924 and exists under the Danish Sports Association. It provides access to sports at any level—from grassroots to internationally competitive, and even the Olympics—to those who are Deaf and hard of hearing. They have helped athletes compete in the Deaflympics since 1924.

=== SALTO-YOUTH ===
SALTO-YOUTH is an organization that has many different projects, one involving helping the Deaf community in Poland. One main project was in partnership with the Polish Association of the Deaf. In 2019, a group of people went to local or rural areas with people in the DHH community that were struggling with work on their houses and or farms. SALTO went to houses and schools in the communities and gave them basic supplies such as writing utensils, food, and water. They also help clean up some areas around the schools. SALTO-Youth advocates for civil and human rights. The organization promotes the right to human education for the DHH community. They want to see every kid have an equal opportunity for education. SALTO-YOUTH provides opportunities to capture attention from authorities to give the DHH people a voice. Overall, they create a safe space for the participants to try out human rights education methods and tools with their community.

== Human/civil rights and the CRPD ==
Deaf people's human rights are inextricably linked to sign language, as emphasized by the Convention on the Rights of Persons with Disabilities, which Poland signed in September 2015. The Committee on the Rights of Persons with Disabilities (CRPD) requires that the countries involved submit periodic reports, to which Poland has complied. The World Federation of the Deaf, an NGO, classifies Poland as a country with Sign Language Recognition, as well as National Language Council Recognition.

=== Poland's Initial Country Report (submitted to the UN) ===
The articles below were chosen based on the World Federation of the Deaf's priority areas.

- Article 9: The government claims that people who are Deaf in Poland receive the same services as a normal person would in all postal stations. Post offices in Poland have a special station for people who are Deaf. This station has locals who can communicate with a Deaf person.
- Article 21: They claim that people who are a part of the DHH community have the same rights to an attorney. A courthouse in Kraków has lawyers who can sign and communicate with a judge. There are special court sessions for those in the DHH community. Forms of communication are different when it comes to the DHH community in Poland. Talking to people in public can be difficult, in article 21 of the CRPD they can have a person assist them in communication with others.
- Article 24: Education is an important thing, especially for children who are Deaf or mute. Every child in Poland is given the right to education, no matter what. By article 24, children in DHH's community can receive assistance in and out of the classroom.

There have been reports of a high rate of sexual violence against both men and women in the DHH community in Poland (as of 2018).

In 2013, many opportunities like jobs and or important events were not easily accessible to the Deaf people of Poland.

=== Deaf Learning Project ===
The Deaf Learning Project has offered rights for the DHH community by providing education for adults who are a part of the DHH community. This project has helped many DHH adults to access education.

=== 4 Step Program ===
The 4 Step Program has offered basic human and civil rights to the DHH community by giving people the aid they need to apply for a job. This program has helped many people in the DHH community get jobs and gain basic skills.

== Language deprivation ==
It is widely acknowledged that language deprivation among Deaf children prevents many individuals and children from acquiring the necessary skills to succeed in society and in the classroom as a result of insufficient exposure to sign language input during early childhood. Many children are not exposed to it at home or school. Hearing loss can affect a person's social skills and ability to communicate, which can lead to language deprivation. For a population scale, data about DHH children's language in Poland is unavailable.

== Primary and secondary education ==
The first school for the Deaf and hard of hearing was founded in 1817. Deaf children were first given access to kindergartens in 1919, after which basic vocational schools were established for the Deaf in 1934. Today there are 39 schools for the Deaf in Poland. Around the world, Deaf children rarely have access to preschool and are often included in typical classrooms with assistants. Poland's Ministry of National Education initiated and funded a project to develop Polish school textbooks adapted to the needs of Deaf students. In the past 30 years, Poland has experienced significant social and educational changes, influencing both students with special needs and ideas about their place in society.

=== Instytut Gtuchoniemych ===
In Poland, there are three schools specifically for DHH students who aim to develop PJM skills. Instytut Gtuchoniemych im. Jakuba Falkowskiego is a school located is Warsaw. Since 1936, this school has offered boarding (housing) to students so that those who do not live nearby can stay at the school during the week. At the Institute, education is provided from pre-school to post-primary level. They mainly focus on reading and writing skills in PJM, as well as basic communication. Their mission is to serve as the educational and cultural center for the Deaf. Parents of Deaf children can take courses at the institute to learn PJM.

=== Zwiazek Zydowskich Gluchoniemych ===
Zwiazek Zydowskich Gluchoniemych (transl. Association of Jewish Deaf-Mute Persons in Poland) was located in Kraków and was founded in 1930. A little over 400 Deaf and hard of hearing Jews were members of the school in Poland during the interwar years. At the Institute primary education was provided as well as extra circulars such as clubs and sports. The school closed in 1939, due to the Second World War outbreak.

== Higher education ==
DHH students must take an admission and proficiency test to attend university. The educational laws governing DHH students were not accepted at the university level until 2001, which made it difficult for DHH students to gain a higher education.

=== Deaf Learning Project ===
Not all Deaf students are accepted to a university, so there is a program called the Deaf Learning Project, in partnership with The Polish Association of the Deaf. As a whole, they prepare national language programs for teaching Deaf adults. The literacy rates in Deaf adults in Poland are low in reading and writing. People who graduate from a secondary education can learn Polish though a 400-hour course.

== Employment ==
Deaf and hard-of-hearing people in Poland struggle to find employment, as a whole the disabled community in Poland has a 38% unemployment rate. The employment rate for disabled people in Poland is low (as of 2010) and continues to decrease over time. This is a lower rate than the average population but it is higher than disabled communities in the UK and Switzerland.

The International Federation of Hard of Hearing Young People (IFHOHYP) conducted a small international survey, not specific to Poland, on Deaf employment. The survey found that a lack of access to hearing technology was a major barrier to employment for DHH people. IFHOHYP recommended that employers and coworkers of DHH people should make more accommodations for DHH as needed. For DHH workers, they recommended educating themselves on their labor and disability rights.

=== 4 Step Program ===
The 4 Step Program is a program that helps support Deaf people in the labor market. This project was started when the UN CRPD was approved in 2006. This program helps increase knowledge of the labor market for people with disabilities, including DHH people. In Poland, the 4 Step Program specifically helps Deaf people on the labor market, they help people prepare to look for jobs. When a person with disabilities is turned away from higher education, the 4 Step program steps in. They help educate people in basic skills and communication. They also help them prepare a resume to find jobs, as well as help them find and apply for a job. Certain activities that they do improve professional skills, gaining work experience. The project activities include workshops, individual action plans, rehabilitation internships, legal and psychological support, training, and other activities that contribute to accomplishing these goals.

== Healthcare ==
The Charter of Rights of Disabled Persons was approved by Polish Parliament in 1997. Interpreters of sign language work in a variety of translation environments, conditions, situations, and bases. Interpreters are available in Poland's hospitals for medical doctor appointments with family physicians, and specialists, both in clinics and hospitals. The specific needs and services are education rehabilitation. A Deaf person in Poland can have access to emergency services with an interpreter. Poland and the EU have free public healthcare systems and children with disabilities, young people with severe disabilities, and the elderly are eligible for medical care allowances. Pediatric cochlear implants have become more accessible in Poland since the 1990s after modifications of the healthcare system.

== Language endangerment and revitalization ==
PJM is legally recognized by the Polish government. PJM is at risk, due to the lack of education and exposure early on, as shown in the Language Depravation section. According to the UNESCO World Atlas of Languages, PJM is an Endangered language.

The influence of Old French Language and German Sign language has kept Polish Sign Language (PJM) in use. Many Deaf school interpreters use Old French Language and German Sign language, to help teach Polish Sign Language. The disappearance of PMJ and increased use of cochlear implants has raised concerns for the DHH community in Poland.
