= EUD =

EUD may refer to:

- End-user development
- Europa-Union Deutschland, a German Eurofederalism organization
- European Union of the Deaf
- Europeans United for Democracy, a former European political party
