= CGSI =

CGSI may refer to:

- Czechoslovak Genealogical Society International
- Confédération Générale des Syndicats Indépendants
- Comitato Giovani Sordi Italiani
