= Disability in Somalia =

Disability in Somalia refers to the related affairs of people with disability in Somalia.

== History ==
Somalia signed the Convention on the Rights of Persons with Disabilities on 2 October 2018 and ratified it on 6 August 2019. It went into effect on 5 September 2019.

== Statistics ==
As of 2020, there are around 5% of Somalia's population have varying degrees of disability. Types of disability exist in Somalia are physical (26%), visual (15%), hearing (12%), mental (12%), speech (6%), intellectual (5%) and others (24%).

== Disability organizations ==
- Somali National Association of the Deaf

== See also ==
- Somalia at the Paralympics
