= Caroline Conlon =

Australian actress and director

Conlon, Caroline
- Occupations: Actress and Director, campaigner for the disabled.

Caroline Conlon is an Australian actress and director. She was the artistic director of the Australian Theatre of the Deaf (ATOD) from 2005 to 2008, and has been involved with ATOD in other roles for nearly 20 years. She was born deaf and attended mainstream schools. In her early twenties she discovered the Deaf community and began using sign language. In 2009 Conlon worked in Western Africa where she provided capacity building training to National Deaf Associations for the World Federation of the Deaf. She has worked with high-profile performers such as Todd McKenney. She has also appeared in the Australian television drama All Saints and has featured in a televised public awareness campaign for IDPwD.

Conlon was a finalist for a Social Inclusion Award at the 2009 National Disability Awards. She is also a Don't DIS my ABILITY ambassador.
