= Austrian Federation of the Deaf =

National federation for the deaf in Austria

The Austrian Federation of the Deaf (ÖGLB), German: Österreichischer Gehörlosenbund, is a national federation for the deaf in Austria.

It is affiliated to the World Federation of the Deaf (WFD) since 1951 and the European Union of the Deaf since 1995. It was established in 1913. Its headquarters are in Vienna. The president is Helene Jarmer.

The Austrian Federation of the Deaf includes 2000 members. The federation took its current name in 1985.

== Advocacy ==
=== Education ===
In 2012, the organization worked with the Association of Austrian Deaf Students to organize a protest about learning gaps in deaf student populations.

In 2025, ÖGLB hosted the 5th International Education Congress at the University of Vienna, where it advocated for sign-language inclusion in schools. The ÖGLB, along with Deaf Associations from Germany and Switzerland, jointly outlined a declaration of key demands to policymakers, including the legal recognition of sign languages, the right to sign language from birth, and implementation of international standards around the rights of deaf people.

ÖGLB advocates for teachers at schools for deaf children being trained in Austrian Sign Language.

=== Accessibility ===
In 2008, ÖGLB worked with Austrian Federal Railways (ÖBB) to place Austrian Sign Language video content on the website to make travel planning easier for deaf people.

=== Healthcare ===
In 2023, ÖGLB put forward demands for removing the barriers access to healthcare for deaf people, both as patients and as healthcare workers.

In 2025, ÖGLB advocated against deaf-exclusive and disability-exclusive austerity measures in the Austrian national 2025/2026 budget, specifically its negative impact on healthcare access.

== Presidents ==
- 1913–1915 Karl Pawlek
- 1915–1917 Josef Pollanetz
- 1917–1919 Franz Wilhelm
- 1919–1921 Theodor Kratochwil
- 1921–1923 Georg Schwarzböck
- 1923–1926 Karl Pawlek
- 1926–1928 Theodor Kratochwil
- 1928–1938 Georg Schwarzböck
- 1940–1943 Karl Johann Brunner
- 1946–1949 Heinrich Prochazka
- 1949–1955 Karl Altenaichinger
- 1956–1960 Heinrich Prochazka
- 1960–1965 Karl Johann Brunner
- 1965–1970 Gerhard Schmidt
- 1970–1985 Willibald Tapler
- 1985–1997 Peter Dimmel
- 1997–2001 Trude Dimmel
- 2001– Helene Jarmer

== See also ==
- Sign language
- Austrian Sign Language
- Deaf culture
