= United Nations Prize in the Field of Human Rights =

Award for human rights

The United Nations Prizes in the Field of Human Rights were instituted by United Nations General Assembly in 1966. They are intended to "honour and commend people and organizations which have made an outstanding contribution to the promotion and protection of the human rights embodied in the Universal Declaration of Human Rights and in other United Nations human rights instruments".

The UN first awarded the prize to six recipients at a ceremony on 10 December 1968 – the 20th anniversary of the Universal Declaration of Human Rights, which the UN has designated Human Rights Day. They have been given out at five-year intervals since then, with the exception of 1983, to individuals, groups and organizations. As of December 2018, 64 awards have been presented, including nine awards presented posthumously (four to recipients who had been murdered while pursuing human rights for others).

The recipients are selected by a committee composed of the presidents of the UN General Assembly, the UN Economic and Social Council and the UN Human Rights Council (which replaced the UN Commission on Human Rights in 2006), and the chairs of the UN Commission on the Status of Women and of the Advisory Committee of the UN Human Rights Council (which replaced the UN Sub-Commission on the Promotion and Protection of Human Rights in 2006). Since 1998, the awards are announced by the Office of the UN High Commissioner for Human Rights, which was created a few days after the 1993 ceremony.

The physical token of the award is a metal plaque bearing the UN seal and an artistic design, and engraved with an appropriate citation. In contrast to the Nobel prizes – whose list of prizewinners of the Nobel Peace Prize shares much common ground with the UN Prize in the Field of Human Rights – the UN's awards are non-monetary in nature.

== 1968 Prizewinners ==
FIRST AWARD: December 1968 – 20th Anniversary of the Universal Declaration of Human Rights:

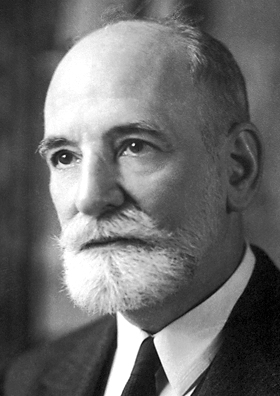
René Cassin

- Manuel Bianchi, chairman of the Inter-American Commission on Human Rights (Chile)
- René Cassin, member of the UN Commission on Human Rights (France)
- Albert Luthuli (posthumously), president of the African National Congress (South Africa)
- Mehrangiz Manouchehrian, attorney and senator (Iran)
- Petr Emelyanovich Nedbailo, member of the UN Commission on Human Rights (Ukraine)
- Eleanor Roosevelt (posthumously), president of the UN Commission on Human Rights (United States)

== 1973 Prizewinners ==
SECOND AWARD: December 1973 – 25th Anniversary of the Universal Declaration of Human Rights:

- Taha Hussein (posthumously), professor of literature (Egypt)
- C. Wilfred Jenks (posthumously), director-general of the International Labour Office (United Kingdom)
- María Lavalle Urbina, lawyer and lecturer (Mexico)
- Abel Muzorewa, president of the United African National Council (Rhodesia)
- Seewoosagur Ramgoolam, prime minister (Mauritius)
- U Thant, UN secretary-general (Burma)

== 1978 Prizewinners ==
THIRD AWARD: December 1978 – 30th Anniversary of the Universal Declaration of Human Rights:

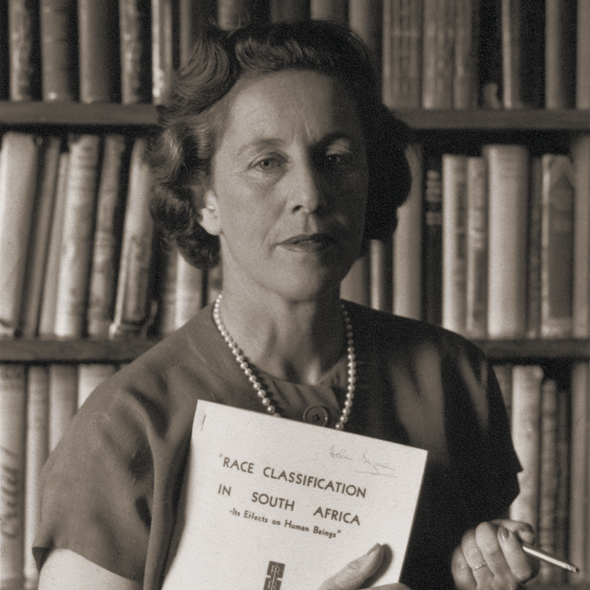
Helen Suzman

- Begum Ra'Ana Liaquat Ali Khan, active in the social, educational and cultural uplift of women (Pakistan)
- Prince Sadruddin Aga Khan, United Nations High Commissioner for Refugees, later a Special Rapporteur of the UN Human Rights Commission (Iran)
- Martin Luther King Jr. (posthumously), assassinated leader of the American civil rights movement (United States)
- Helen Suzman, anti-apartheid activist and politician (South Africa)
- International Committee of the Red Cross
- Amnesty International
- Vicariate of Solidarity (Chile)
- National Union of Tunisian Women (Tunisia)

== 1988 Prizewinners ==
FOURTH AWARD: December 1988 – 40th Anniversary of the Universal Declaration of Human Rights:

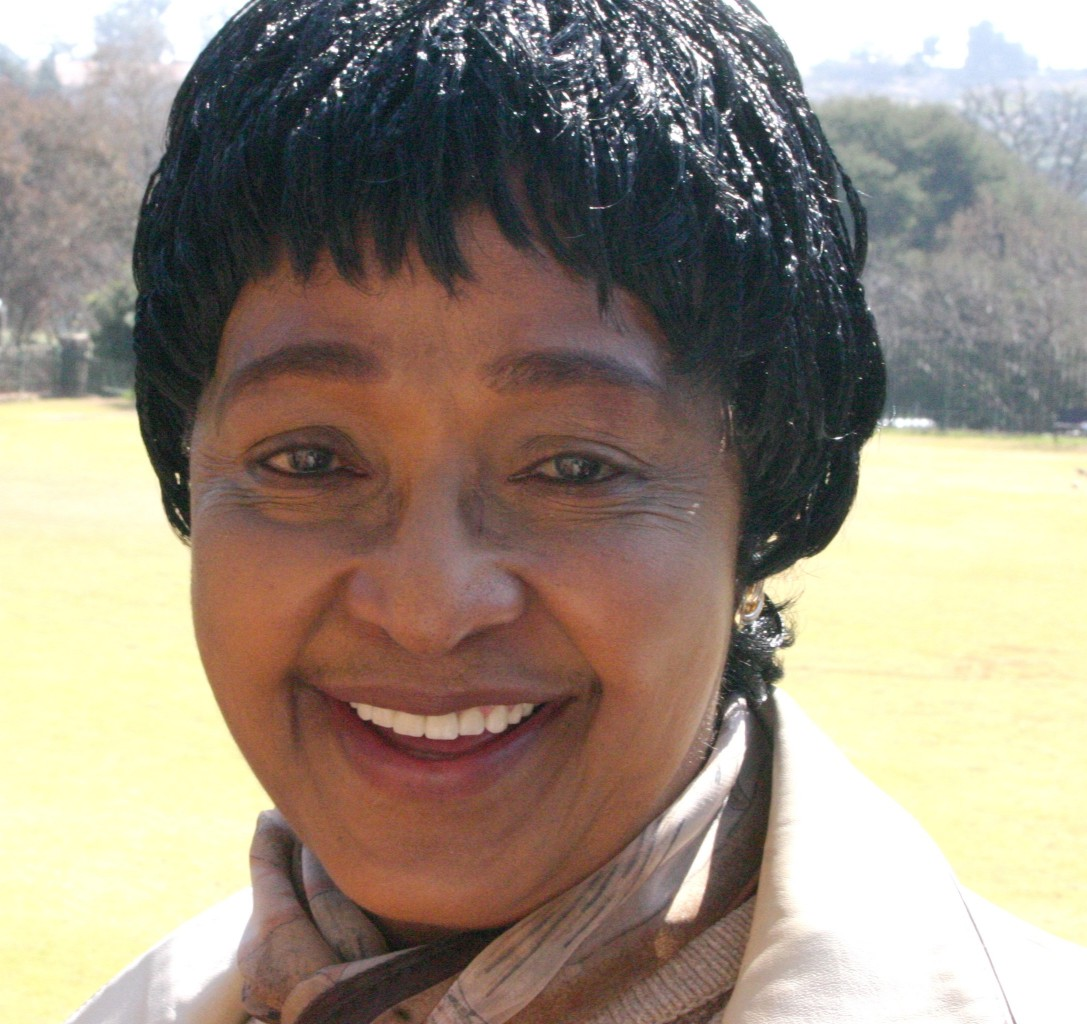
Winnie Mandela

- Baba Amte, human rights lawyer (India)
- John Peters Humphrey, principal drafter of the UN's Universal Declaration of Human Rights (Canada)
- Adam Lopatka, president of the Supreme Court (Poland)
- Leonidas Proaño, Roman Catholic bishop (Ecuador)
- Nelson Mandela, lawyer and statesman (South Africa)
- Winnie Mandela, medical social worker (South Africa)

== 1993 Prizewinners ==
FIFTH AWARD: December 1993 – 45th Anniversary of the Universal Declaration of Human Rights:

- Hassib Ben Ammar, president of the Tunisian Human Rights League and of Arab Organization for Human Rights (Tunisia)
- Erica-Irene Daes, chair of the UN's Working Group on Indigenous Populations (Greece)
- James P. Grant, executive director of UNICEF (United States)
- International Commission of Jurists (based in Geneva)
- Medical personnel of the Central Hospital of Sarajevo
- Sonia Picado Sotela, vice-president of the Inter-American Court of Human Rights (Costa Rica)
- Ganesh Man Singh, supreme leader of Nepal
- Sudanese Women's Union (Sudan)
- Julio Tumiri Javier, founder of the Permanent Assembly for Human Rights (Bolivia)

== 1998 Prizewinners ==
SIXTH AWARD: December 1998 – 50th Anniversary of the Universal Declaration of Human Rights:

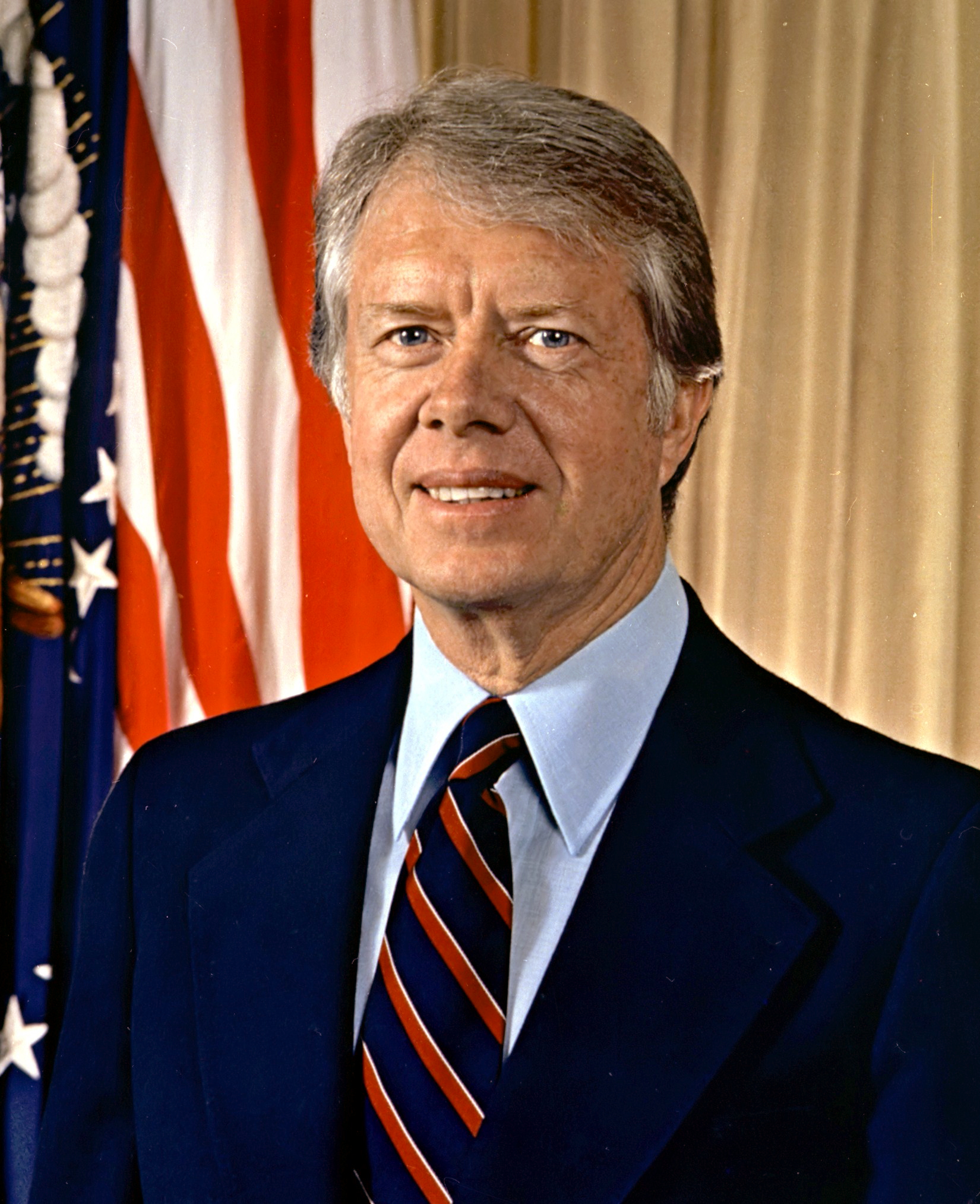
Jimmy Carter

- Sunila Abeysekera, executive director of INFORM (Sri Lanka)
- Angelina Acheng Atyam, founder of the Concerned Parents Association (Uganda)
- Jimmy Carter, statesman and former president (United States)
- José Gregori, inaugural Secretary, National Human Rights Secretariat (Brazil)
- Anna Šabatová, founder of Charter 77 (Czech Republic)
- All human rights defenders, "thousands of courageous individuals worldwide"

== 2003 Prizewinners ==
SEVENTH AWARD: December 2003 – 55th Anniversary of the Universal Declaration of Human Rights:

- Enriqueta Estela Barnes de Carlotto, president of the Grandmothers of the Plaza de Mayo (Argentina)
- Mano River Women's Peace Network (Sierra Leone, Liberia, and Guinea)
- Family Protection Project Management Team (Jordan)
- Deng Pufang, chairman of the China Disabled Persons' Federation (People's Republic of China)
- Shulamith Koenig, executive director of the People's Movement for Human Rights Education (United States)
- Sérgio Vieira de Mello (posthumously), UN Special Representative murdered in Iraq (Brazil)

== 2008 Prizewinners ==
EIGHTH AWARD: December 2008 – 60th Anniversary of the Universal Declaration of Human Rights:

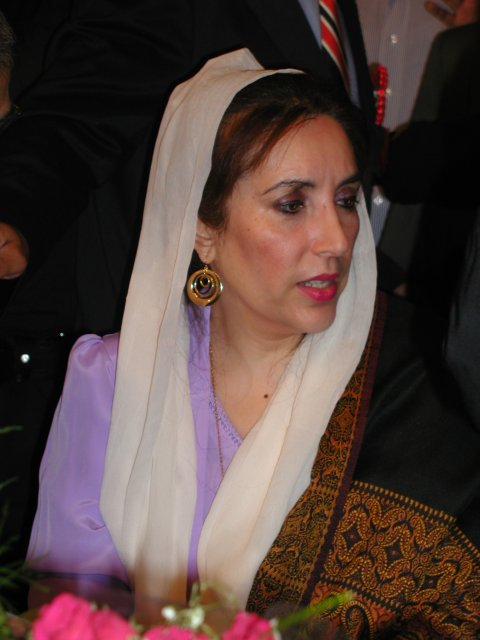
Benazir Bhutto

- Louise Arbour, former UN High Commissioner for Human Rights (Canada)
- Benazir Bhutto (posthumously), assassinated former prime minister and leader of the opposition (Pakistan)
- Ramsey Clark, former Attorney General (United States)
- Dr. Carolyn Gomes of Jamaicans for Justice
- Dr. Denis Mukwege, co-founder of the General Referral Hospital of Panzi (Democratic Republic of the Congo)
- Sr. Dorothy Stang (posthumously), murdered Roman Catholic nun (Brazil)
- Human Rights Watch

== 2013 Prizewinners ==
NINTH AWARD: December 2013 – 65th Anniversary of the Universal Declaration of Human Rights:

- Biram Dah Abeid, son of a freed slave who works to eradicate slavery (Mauritania)
- Hiljmnijeta Apuk, a campaigner for the rights of people of short stature (Kosovo)
- Liisa Kauppinen, President Emeritus of the World Federation of the Deaf (Finland)
- Khadija Ryadi, former President of the Morocco Association for Human Rights (Morocco)
- Supreme Court of Justice (Mexico)
- Malala Yousafzai, schoolgirl shot by the Taliban for attending school (Pakistan)

== 2018 Prizewinners ==
TENTH AWARD: December 2018 – 70th Anniversary of the Universal Declaration of Human Rights:

- Asma Jahangir (posthumously), human rights lawyer (Pakistan)
- Rebeca Gyumi, activist for the rights of women and girls (Tanzania)
- Joenia Wapichana, activist for the rights of indigenous communities (Brazil)
- Front Line Defenders, organization advocating and working for the protection of human rights defenders (Ireland)

== 2023 Prizewinners ==
ELEVENTH AWARD: December 2023 – 75th Anniversary of the Universal Declaration of Human Rights:

- Viasna Human Rights Centre, Belarus
- Julienne Lusenge, Democratic Republic of the Congo
- Amman Center for Human Rights Studies, Jordan
- Julio Pereyra Sánchez, Uruguay
- Global Coalition of Civil Society Organizations, Indigenous Peoples, Social Movements, and Local Communities for the Universal Recognition of the Right to a Clean, Healthy, and Sustainable Environment
