= Ukrainian Association of the Blind =

Ukrainian non-governmental organization

The Ukrainian Association of the Blind (Ukrainian: Українське товариство сліпих), known by the acronym UTOS (УТОС), is a Ukrainian public organization for the visually impaired. The UTOS was founded on 4 June 1933, by the All-Ukrainian Central Executive Committee, and the Council of People's Commissars of the Ukrainian SSR, to establish a Ukrainian society for the blind. Now various companies produce a UASB range of household goods and garden equipment from polymers, as well as low-voltage electrical products and equipment for production and engineering facilities.

== History ==
The Ukrainian Society for the Blind was formed on 4 June 1933, alongside the Ukrainian Society of the Deaf, after a decision made by the Central Executive Committee and Council of People's Commissars of the USSR. Up until the creation of the society, there were 12 local organizations of visually impaired people with an overall membership of over 100 people. By 1934, 470 blind people were already working in 12 workshops of UTOS. They produced goods in an amount of 5.3 million rubles (~6.8 million dollars, ~5.8 million euros), by using waste materials. In the same year, the first issue of a children's magazine in Braille was published, Yunyy pioneer (Shkolnik since 1969). In 1935, 2411 disabled people had been given employment in 78 such workshops, operated in Ukraine. There was founded the magazine in Braille Pratsya slipykh, the predecessor of the magazine Zaklik.

In 1936 the Central Library of the Ukrainian Association of the Blind was founded. Its collection is made up of approximately 170,000 items in various languages such as Ukrainian, Russian, Polish, etc. Formats include audiobooks and periodicals, Braille books, videos and CDs. It provides reference and information services and serves 40,000 users annually.

In 1941, the business UTOS employed more than 2,700 people with visual handicaps. Society had 38 hostels, 33 clubs, 37 libraries. In 1956, the enterprise district and urban societies blind renamed training production plants (TPP). In 1991, the number of members of the company was 58,000. Operates 190 primary organizations (79 industrial and 111 local). In Lviv (1992), a petition raised enough signage that the NGO sought out to protect the visually impaired economically and socially. Soon thereafter they recruited the first group of blind students to Henichesk medical school.

In 1993, International Biographical Centre in Cambridge (UK) awarded GO Tseytlin the title "Man of the Year 1992". The system is widely marked as the 75th anniversary of the birth and the 50th anniversary of the death of the Hero of the Soviet Union Yakov Batyuk.

In 1994, amateur groups from UTOS took an active part in the disability festival in Ukraine "Inspiration". A Training and Information Center computer Blind. Despite serious financial and economic difficulties that are experienced in this period and society, the system successfully developed a sport amateur. Ukraine's team of UTOS then won several silver and bronze medals at the IPC Swimming World Championships in Valletta.

In 1995, and collective enterprises and organizations UTOS continued discussing new edition of the company's charter. On 22–23 May 1996, the 23rd Congress of UTOS was held in Yevpatoria, Crimea. It was attended by over 190 delegates. Congress approved amendments to the Articles of Association, adopted the concept and main directions of its activities for the next period. The Chairman of the Central Board of the Company elected Vladislav Bilchych.

In 1997, based on national service training executives and professionals UTOS, was a psychological and practical rehabilitation of the first group of blind people, mostly young people, from all regions of Ukraine and in Ryksyvani (Italy), took place European Championships in athletics and swimming among the visually impaired. This prestigious event brought Utosivtsi 4 gold, 10 silver, and 9 bronze medals. At the initiative of blind Ph.D., Georgy Tseytlin founded the association Window to the World.

In 1998, the Blind Rehabilitation Center of UTOS was opened in Kiev. In 1999, and Community Association celebrated the 10th anniversary of the publication of the first issue of the newspaper "Ray" and the 65th anniversary - of "pupil". VIII Plenum of the Central Bank UTOS discussed "Status of rehabilitation work in the system and ways to improve " and identified new ways, forms and very important methods of work.

In 2000, and ninth plenum of the Central Bank UTOS, considered the question, " The work of associations, enterprises and organizations UTOS in 1999 and the priorities of the Society in 2000", stated the release utosivskoho the beginning of the crisis, increase in output. UTOS community celebrated the 65th anniversary of the journal = "The Call ". Blind athletes competing in three sports successfully performed at the 2000 Summer Paralympics in Sydney. They have won 13 medals - 2 gold, 5 silver, and 6 bronze. The best Ukrainian Paralympians were granted the Order of Merit of the 2nd and 3rd degrees by the decree of the President of Ukraine.

On 22–23 May 2001, the 24th Congress of UTOS took place. He has made amendments to the Articles of Association, adopted the Regulation on the central government and the Central Auditing Commission UTOS. Congress approved the Concept of the Guidelines of the Ukrainian Society for the Blind of social work and rehabilitation, social protection, and social integration of visually impaired people in the 2001 – 2005 years. The piper ensemble of Kamianets-Podilskyi Training And Production Enterprise represented Khmelnytskyi Oblast during a concert of popular talents on the main stage of Palace "Ukraine", devoted to the 10th anniversary of Ukraine's independence. The Republican Library, named after Nikolay Ostrovsky, then celebrated the 65th anniversary of its creation.

In 2002, there is a direct hotline in which the question of visually impaired people responsible head of Securities Blind VM Bilchych. International Committee of the registration champions and international champions handed the club totally blind artist from Kharkov Dmitry Didorenko just three awards: a special diploma club medal and the prestigious statuette of Nike. At the 2002 Winter Paralympics in Salt Lake City, Ukrainian blind skiers won three medals, two silver by Oleh Munts, and a bronze by Vitaliy Lukyanenko.

On 23–24 May 2006, the 25th Congress of UTOS was held in Yevpatoria, Crimea. The congress approved the concept of reforming UTOS and adopted a programme of its main activities for 2006–2010.

== Objectives and goals ==
The state-sponsored association is involved in the social, employment, medical, and vocational rehabilitation of the disabled citizens of Ukraine, who can not compete in the labor market. It provides employment, healthcare, and social protection for the visually impaired. The organization is focused locally, as well as in areas where there is a need to organize training and company production. Blind people in the association receive the full range of social protection, and the ability to find opportunities to live and to work. Destination of selected features of blind people to perform a particular job. Help the state goes on direct financing of projects, and indirectly by providing tax benefits to companies creating public procurement system Blind.
