= Deafness in Luxembourg =

Luxembourg's deaf/ hard of hearing community consists of 300 out of their general population of 659,000 people. Luxembourg's official sign language is German Sign Language or Deutsche Gebärdensprache (DGS) which has an estimated 600 users across the country. This sign language is protected in Luxembourg by their ratification of the United Nations' Convention on the Rights of Persons with Disabilities in 2011. Further protected by the 2018 amendment, Law No. 7142, that guaranteed every deaf/ hard of hearing child the right to education in sign language. Luxembourg screens newborns through Otoacoustic emissions or Auditory evoked potentials for signals of hearing impairments. Luxembourg uses rehabilitation services including Rehabilitation of Newborns - Hëllef fir de Puppelchen ASBL and Sipo, to support those children flagged with hearing impairments. In school, most deaf/ hard of hearing students are in mainstream schooling with exceptions for more severe cases that go to Centre de Logopédie, a school for speech disorders in Luxembourg.

== Human and civil rights ==
=== Convention on the Rights of Persons with Disabilities ===
The Convention on the Rights of Persons with Disabilities (CRPD) was created by the United Nations (UN) with the purpose of promoting equal opportunity and “enjoyment of all human rights and fundamental freedoms” with all in the disability community. The document was effective after 2008. Luxembourg signed the document in 2007 and officially ratified on September 26, 2011.

In Luxembourg’s “List of issues prior to submission” to the Committee on the Rights of Persons with Disabilities, those in Luxembourg list recommendations for the country to better comply with the CRPD. Here is a list of recommendations from the CRPD report in May 2026:

- Concern in the area of humanitarian emergencies including crisis communication, evacuation plans, alarm systems, and shelters being fully accessible to the disability communities. Including training in first responders in disability inclusion.
- Concern in the area of freedom of expression and opinion, and access to information. A call for a more accessible television program experience including audio description, sign language, and subtitling.
- Concern in areas of health including ensuring that health facilities have the means of communication and equipment for proper communication with people with disabilities. Health personnel to be trained on the rights of people with disabilities and their access to healthcare services.

=== European Union of the Deaf ===
The European Union of the Deaf (EUD) details Luxembourg’s sign language rights in their “From recognition to officialisation: A European evolution of sign language rights.” Luxembourg scores a 4/8 in their evaluation of sign language rights in the country. The EUD outlines recommendations for increased sign language rights in Luxembourg:

- Including explicit legal provisions on equality and prohibition of discrimination against German Sign Language to ensure its use in both private and public spaces.
- Promoting identity and culture of the deaf community as a part of Luxembourg’s national heritage.
- Establishing a legal framework for DGS to be established as a language subject for deaf students.
- Establishing rules that govern the access to DGS interpreters.
- Establishing DGS broadcasting availability, especially for emergency-related information.
- Establishing a DGS Board to advise the government on matters relating to DGS, with the inclusion of deaf sign language users on the board.

== Sign languages ==
Luxembourg’s deaf/ hard of hearing population consists of around 300 of the 659,000 general population. The official sign language of the region is German Sign Language or Deutsche Gebärdensprache (DGS), as the principal languages in the country are German and French. There are an estimated 600 users of DGS in Luxembourg.

German Sign Language was recognized on September 23rd, 2018. It was an amendment to the Law of February 24 1984 on the language of the regime. Originally, the law outlined the national language being Luxembourgish and places where German and French are utilized inside the regime. The 2018 amendment recognized DGS which gave the deaf community the right to use it in their interactions with public authorities. This obliges the Ministry responsible for Disability Affairs to provide sign language interpreters.

Sign language interpreters total to just three throughout the country. There are two sign language interpreters at the school for the deaf and at government agencies. The other interpreter is at Solidarität mit Hörgeschädigten asbl (Solidarity with the Hearing Impaired), an organization for the deaf/hard of hearing community in Luxembourg.

== Newborn hearing screening ==
In Luxembourg, all newborns receive free hearing screenings either during or after the second day after a child’s birth, done while the baby is asleep. These screenings can be done at the hospital or at an Audiophonologie Service. There are two types of tests that can be done on the baby, including Otoacoustic emissions (OAEs) or Auditory evoked potentials (AEPs). If these a child's hearing does not meet the standard, a second hearing screening is done.

=== Bilan 30 ===
Once a child is 30 months, the Audiology Service invites parents to have a speech assessment during which a hearing test is conducted. This is the Bilan 30 assessment. The test includes children locating a bass, mid and treble sounds at 40 dB in a game setting. Bilan 30 is a quick way for children to be tested for temporary or permanent hearing loss.

== Early intervention ==
According to Luxembourg's Public Service Portal, Guichet.lu, Luxembourg gives general guidance, rehabilitation, and support services to children between the ages of 0 and 4. This service is open to children with motor activity, sensory perception, cognition, communication and language, autonomy, socialisation, and personality disorders.

=== Early years support services ===
If newborn or early childhood examinations have detected a possible disparity, child guardians can contact an early years support service. Luxembourg has two early years rehabilitation services that work closely together; Rehabilitation of Newborns - Hëllef fir de Puppelchen ASBL and Sipo.

==== Rehabilitation of Newborns - Hëllef fir de Puppelchen ASBL Services ====
These services offer therapeutic care including observation, treatment, and referrals for children aged 0-4 years old presenting a disorder.

==== Sipo services ====
These services include psychology assessments and therapeutic care for children aged 0-6 years old who present a developmental disorder. At Sipo, services range from screening through interventions.

==== Hard of Hearing/ Language Difficulties ====
When a child turns three months old, child guardians receive an invitation for a hearing and language development check-up. This is not a mandatory check-up but it is strongly advised to attend to catch any disparities early. If a disparity is found, child guardians are able to access audiology services free of charge. In the event of serve hearing loss, children can attend Centre de Logopédie for schooling.

== Primary and secondary education ==
=== Ministry of National Education, Youth and Children ===
The Ministry of National Education, Youth and Children (Ministère de l'Éducation nationale, de l'Enfance et de la Jeunesse or MENJE) is Luxembourg's government agency responsible for managing and planning the education system. According to the MENJE, Luxembourg has made significant investments in staff and infrastructure in its primary and secondary schools. These advancements have enabled there to be an increase in outpatient support for students within the mainstream education system. The MENJE highlights their high rate of inclusion, citing less than 1% of students in Luxembourg are enrolled in a specialized school.

==== Mainstream schooling support systems ====
There are many support systems in place for students with special education needs in mainstream schools. Teachers who are specialized in teaching students with special education needs (I-EBS) work directly in mainstream primary schools. Special education assistants (SEAs) are also in schools to assist teachers in the mainstream primary schools.

- Support teams for students with special education needs (ESEB) work both in primary and secondary schools to assist with student need.
- Eight specialized psychopedagogy competence centers and a transition agency are available to students in primary and secondary schools.
- Parents can contact the National Inclusion Commission for any request concerning a specialized treatment.

==== National Inclusive Education Service ====
The National Illusive Education Service (SNEI) was established on July 16, 2023 to continue improvement in the school system. This department was made in response to a 2022 evaluation report of Luxembourg of the school system.

=== Primary education ===
There are many measures of support in secondary schools for students with special education needs. Here are a list of some:

- Accommodations
  - Teachers can work with the school's teaching team to adapt classroom teaching.
  - Reasonable accommodations can be put in place that aim to adapt learning and assessment methods to the student's needs.
- Academic expansion
  - Students have the opportunity to participate in a development and learning workshop. These contain activities targeted at addressing learning difficulties and disorders of language, motor skills, or socio-emotional development.
  - Students may temporarily attend classes for learning certain subjects in a class outside of their home classroom.

=== Secondary education ===
There are many measures of support in secondary schools for students with special education needs. Here are a list of some:

- Academic support
  - Students have the opportunity to delve deeper into specific subjects of study both individually and in small groups.
  - Classroom instruction and teaching content is adapted to the specific needs of the student in collaboration with the support team (ESEB).
- Accommodations
  - Partial or total reorientation can be suggested for other training pathways or specialized classes. These specialized classes allows for the pace, content, and the teaching to be adapted to student need.
  - The Reasonable Accommodations Commission (CAR) relegate reasonable accommodations that are granted within secondary education.

=== Centre de Logopédie ===
A Law of 20 July 2018 established Centers of Expertise in Specialized Psycho-Pedagogy for School Inclusion. One of these centers includes Centre de Logopédie, which specializes in speech therapy for all speech disorders. At Centre de Logopédie, there are currently 330 students attending and around 40 of those students have hearing impairments. The school applies a bilingual approach to learning by combining speaking/ orally teaching and German Sign Language teaching. The students are also required to learn writing and speaking in both French and German. After a 2018 law, teaching staff were required to complete a two-year training course in German Sign Language. The school employs two sign language interpreters who are also the interpreters to services at all government agencies in Luxembourg.
