= Pakistan Association of the Deaf =

Non-profit organization in Pakistan

- Abbreviation: PAD
- Founded: 1987; 38 years ago
- Website: padeaf.org

Pakistan Association of the Deaf (PAD) is the national organisation representing deaf people in Pakistan. It is a member of the World Federation of the Deaf.
