= The Qatari Center of Social Cultural for the Deaf =

Qatari national organization for the deaf

The Qatari Center of Social Cultural for the Deaf (QCSCD; Arabic: المركز القطري للثقافة الاجتماعية للصم) is the national organisation representing deaf people in Qatar. It is a member of the World Federation of the Deaf. As of 2015, it is chaired by Ali Al-Sennari.

== History ==
The organization was founded in 2005, following the government adoption of the Qatari Sign Language in 2001. It is affiliated with the Ministry of Culture, Arts and Heritage. Founded as a smaller part of a collection of civil rights reformations in the country targeted at providing awareness and technology to a historically underserved group.

== Mission ==
QCSCD's primary objectives involve helping deaf people assimilate into the hearing society and offering unique services to them. In addition, they aim to inform deaf individuals of their rights, while also advocating via media for the adoption of new laws to avert discrimination. More narrowly defined goals by the organization include improving the translation of written text to sign language and making emergency services more accessible to deaf people.

== Activities ==
In May 2012, in cooperation with the National Human Rights Committee, QCSCD launched a forum for deaf women in order to help them better cope in society. Besides organizing forums, the organization also supervises training sessions in sign language for local companies.

The first edition of the International Forum for the Deaf Muslims was held in Doha in November 2013 under the auspices of the QCSCD. More than 48 nationalities were represented at the forum.
