= Lesley Hall =

Australian disability advocate and arts administrator

Lesley Maria Hall OAM (27 November 1954 – 19 October 2013) was a disability advocate, arts administrator, writer and activist. She was one of the founders of the Women with Disabilities Feminist Collective (WDFC), now known as Women with Disabilities Australia (WWDA), and Chief Executive Officer of the Australian Federation of Disability Organisations (AFDO). She was also co-founder of the Disability Resource Centre, and was credited with getting her brother Frank Hall-Bentick involved in the organisation, as well as disability advocacy.

In 1981 Hall staged a protest at the Miss Australia Quest, a beauty pageant held as a fundraiser for the organisation then known as the Spastic Society. In relation to the contests she stated:

We are challenging the notion of beauty and we reject the charity ethic... Beauty quests that raise money in the name of disabled people do us a double disservice. Through patronising fund raising activities, the community is shown again and again that we are "inferior" people. People in the community must be allowed to develop positive attitudes towards us. The abolition of beauty quests will be a significant step towards this end.

Hall was a member of the Melbourne Workers Theatre, and worked as an arts officer for the Darebin City Council.

Hall was known for her disability advocacy, including contributing to the formation of the National Disability Insurance Scheme.

== Recognition ==
Hall was inducted onto the Victorian Honour Roll of Women in 2014. She received a posthumous Order of Australia medal in 2015. The Lesley Hall Scholarship is an annual award in Hall's honour by Arts Access Victoria.
