= Hiljmnijeta Apuk =

Kosovan activist

- Born: 1956 (age 69–70); Mitrovica, Kosovo, Yugoslavia
- Education: Economics, Law
- Occupations: Activist, Director of Little People of Kosovo, Artist
- Known for: Campaigning for the rights of people of short stature and people with disabilities
- Awards: United Nations Prize in the Field of Human Rights (2013)

Hiljmnijeta Apuk (born 1956) is a Kosovar campaigner for the rights of people of short stature. In 2013, she was a recipient of the United Nations Prize in the Field of Human Rights.

== Biography ==
Hiljmnijeta Apuk was born in 1956 in the city of Mitrovica, Kosovo, in what was then Yugoslavia. Her family is Bosniak. Apuk was born with disproportionately low growth. Her parents were supportive of her efforts to gain independence, for example through helping to adapt her car so she would be able to reach the pedals, and she obtained a driver's license at age 18. This opened the door for her to pursue education, and she went on to study economics and law.

Apuk has been an activist for the rights of people with disabilities, particularly those with muscular dystrophy and dwarfism, since the 1980s. She is the founding director of the non-governmental organization Little People of Kosovo. The organization was founded after the end of the Kosovo War in 1999, inspired by the U.S. organization Little People of America.

Through the organization and other volunteer work, she fights for employment opportunities for people with disabilities. She is also active in campaigning for women and girls with disabilities, who face an intersection of discrimination.

Apuk served as a member of the United Nations General Assembly's ad hoc committee on drafting the Convention on the Rights of Persons with Disabilities. She is also an artist, whose work aims to center what she calls the "authentic culture" of people with disabilities.

In 2013, she received the United Nations Prize in the Field of Human Rights for her activist work.
