= Liisa Kauppinen =

Finnish lawyer and human rights activist

Liisa Kauppinen (née Salokorpi; born 12 May 1939 in Nurmo, Finland) is a Finnish human rights activist who lost her hearing as a child. After serving as executive director of the Finnish Association of the Deaf, in 1995 she became the first woman to be appointed President of the World Federation of the Deaf. She has contributed internationally to opportunities for women with disabilities while promoting the use of sign languages in connection with the Convention on the Rights of Persons with Disabilities. In 2013, she was awarded the United Nations Human Rights Prize, the first Finn to receive the award. In 2015 the WFD established the Dr. Liisa Kauppinen Fund to honour her contributions and to fund activities focused on the empowerment of deaf girls and women. In 2019 she was the recipient of a lifetime achievement award from the Light of the World Group.

== Biography ==
Born in Nurmo on 12 May 1939, Liisa Kauppinen lost her hearing when she was five years old following meningitis. She later attended a school for the deaf in Oulu. Kauppinen has devoted her life to improving conditions for deaf people and assisting in human rights initiatives throughout her career. She was appointed executive director of the Finnish Association of the Deaf in 1976, serving a new term from 1991 to 2006. After executive positions at the World Federation of the Deaf from 1983, she became the organization's first female president in 1995. She has strived constantly to promote the rights of deaf people in Finland and internationally. Kauppinen is fluent in Finnish, Swedish, English, American Sign Language and International Sign.

Her work has also centered on the rights of women, especially those of women with disabilities. Supporting gender equality, she has initiated international projects with deaf communities in Africa, Central and South-East Asia, Latin American, the Balkans and North-West Russia. Her firm commitment to sign languages led to their inclusion in the Convention of the Rights of Persons with Disabilities. As a result of her work, she was awarded the United Nations Human Rights Prize in 2013.

== Selected bibliography ==
- Kauppinen, Liisa; Jokinen, Markku (2014). "Including Deaf Culture and Linguistic Rights". Human Rights and Disability Advocacy: 131–145. ISBN 978-0-8122-4547-9.
- Kauppinen, Liisa; Kuurojen liitto (1997). Kuurot ja viestintä: Kuurojen liiton viestintäpoliittinen ohjelma. Helsinki: Kuurojen liitto. ISBN 978-952-9883-14-1.
- Disability and human rights: speeches at the opening of the International Disability Centre, Ferney-Voltaire, France, 4 July 1997. Geneva, Switzerland: International Disability Foundation. 1997.
- Kauppinen, Liisa; Savisaari, R; Suosalmi, M (1987). One world one responsibility: X World Congress of the WFD, Finland 20.-28.7.1987.
