= Antonio Magarotto =

Italian educator

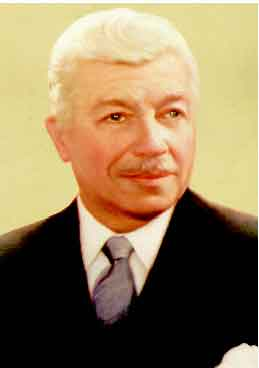
Antonio Magarotto

Antonio Magarotto (30 June 1891 in Pojana Maggiore – 10 May 1966 in Rome) was an Italian educator, founder of the Ente Nazionale Sordi (ENS) and rector of the Padua Deaf institute. His son Cesare Magarotto founded the World Federation of the Deaf.

== Biography ==
Born in Pojana Maggiore, Magarotto became deaf at age three because of a meningitis. He was sent to a deaf school, the Tommaso Pendola Institute in Siena where he learned to speak and lipsread.

When he moved to Padua, he founded the Deaf Association of the Veneto Region. In the year of 1923, he obtained from the Mussolini government a law that enabled the deaf and blind people to attend elementary schools.

In 1932, on the day of Saint Anthony of Padua, together with his deaf friends, he founded the Italian National Agency for the Deaf where he was president from 1932 to 1950.

== Honors ==
Streets in five Italian cities were named in honor of Magarotto: Pojana Maggiore, Padua, Rome, Abano Terme and Alcamo.
