= Amman Center for Human Rights Studies =

Amman Center for Human Rights Studies مركز عمان لدراسات حقوق الإنسان
- Abbreviation: ACHRS
- Formation: 1999
- Purpose: Human rights studies
- Headquarters: Al Abdali
- Location: Amman
- Region served: Jordan
- Director: Nizam Assaf
- Website: achrs.org

Amman Center for Human Rights Studies (ACHRS) is an independent, regional, scientific, advocacy center for studies, research and training on issues of human rights and democracy in the Middle East.

In 2023, Amman Center for Human Rights Studies is awarded United Nations Prize in the Field of Human Rights.

== See also ==
- List of human rights organisations
