= Hungarian Association of the Deaf and Hard of Hearing =

- Siketek és Nagyothallók Országos Szövetsége
- Abbreviation: SINOSZ
- Founded: 1907; 119 years ago
- Purpose: To improve the lives and access to education of deaf and hard of hearing Hungarians
- Headquarters: Budapest, Hungary
- Coordinates: 47.5105791°N 19.0718589°E
- Website: sinosz.hu

The Hungarian Association of the Deaf and Hard of Hearing (Hungarian: Siketek és Nagyothallók Országos Szövetsége, SINOSZ) was founded in 1907. Its headquarters are located in Budapest, Hungary. The goal of this association is to improve the lives and access to education of deaf and hard of hearing Hungarians.

SINOSZ provides various services for the deaf and hard of hearing and their families, such as legal consultation, communication courses, audiology centers, and help paperwork/applications.

SINOSZ is a member of World Federation of the Deaf (WFD), European Union of the Deaf (EUD), International Federation of Hard of Hearing People (IFHOH), and European Federation of Hard of Hearing People (EFHOH).
