= Helene Jarmer =

Austrian politician (born 1971)

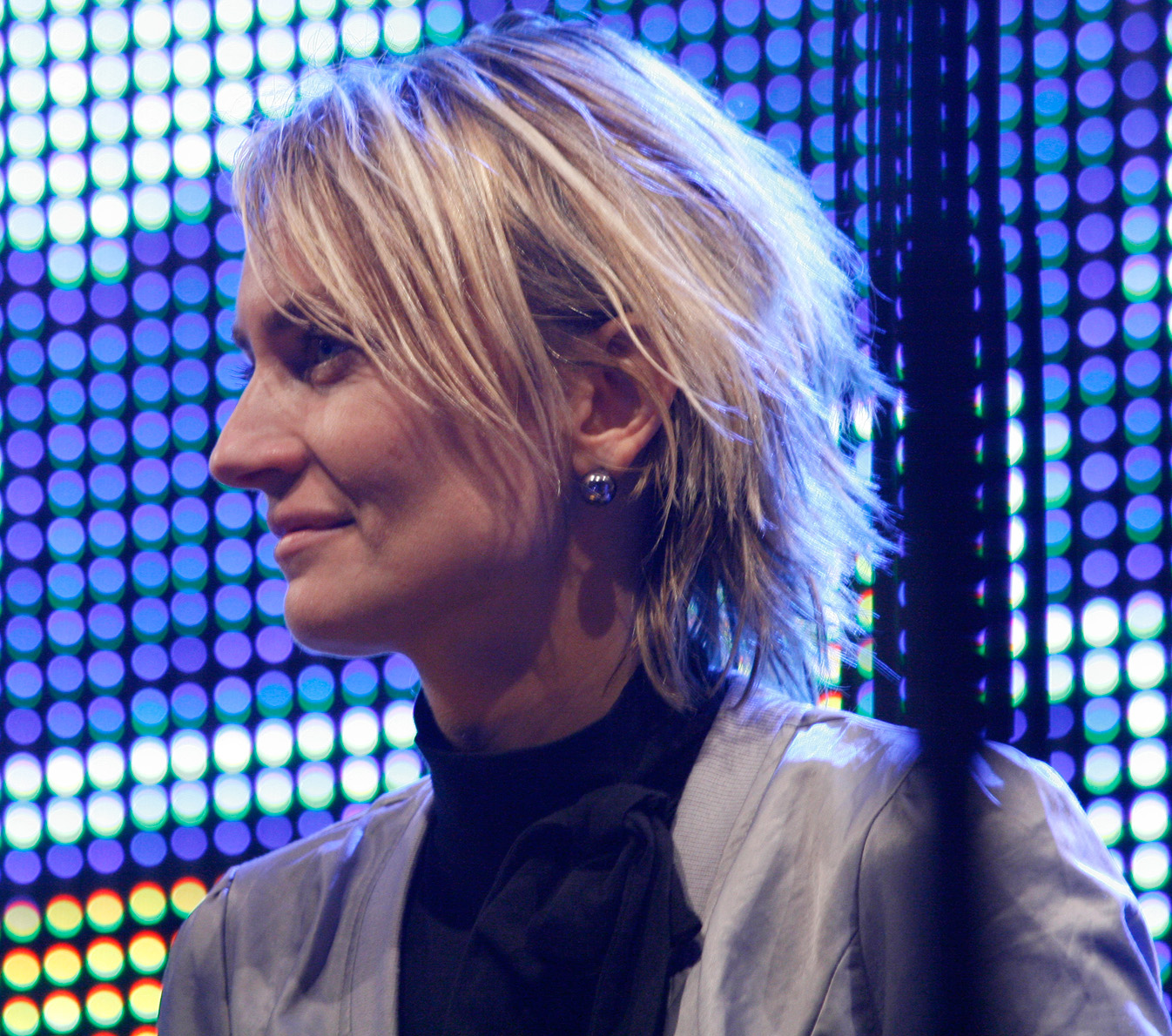
Helene Jarmer in 2009

Helene Jarmer (born August 8, 1971), as a member of the National Council of Austria, is the third culturally Deaf person in world history to be elected to a national parliament (after Wilma Newhoudt-Druchen of South Africa who was elected to the South African Parliament in 1999, and Dimitra Arapoglou who was elected to the Greek Parliament in 2007).

== Biography ==
=== Early life and education ===
Helene Jarmer became deaf at the age of two as the result of an auto accident. She attended a school for hard-of-hearing students after having been categorized by physicians as being hard of hearing. This afforded her a better quality of education, since in those days the schools for the deaf in Austria were not in the best condition, because none of them allowed sign language to be used for instructional purposes. She graduated as a mainstream student from the Technical High School (Höhere Technische Lehranstalt) of the Ungargasse Education Center (Schulzentrum Ungargasse) in Vienna, Austria.

Jarmer then attended and graduated from a teacher training program to be qualified to teach deaf and hard-of-hearing students at high schools (Hauptschule) and in schools for the deaf. After that she taught for eleven years at the National Institute for the Deaf (Bundesinstitut für Gehörlosenbildung). During this time she taught a bilingual class which included both deaf and hearing students alike, as part of a laboratory school setting.

=== Parliament ===
On July 10, 2009, Helene Jarmer succeeded Ulrike Lunacek in the National Council of Austria. Lunacek became of member of the European Parliament in July 2009.

== See also ==
Jarmer, Helene, Inaugural Address to the Austrian National Council, July 10, 2009.

"Shouting won't help," says new member Helene Jarmer: First speech given by a Deaf person in Parliament, News.at, July 10, 2009.

Chapman, Lisa, "First Deaf MP is Sworn In," Austrian Times, July 10, 2009.
