= Pendola Institute, Siena =

Institute in Siena, Italy

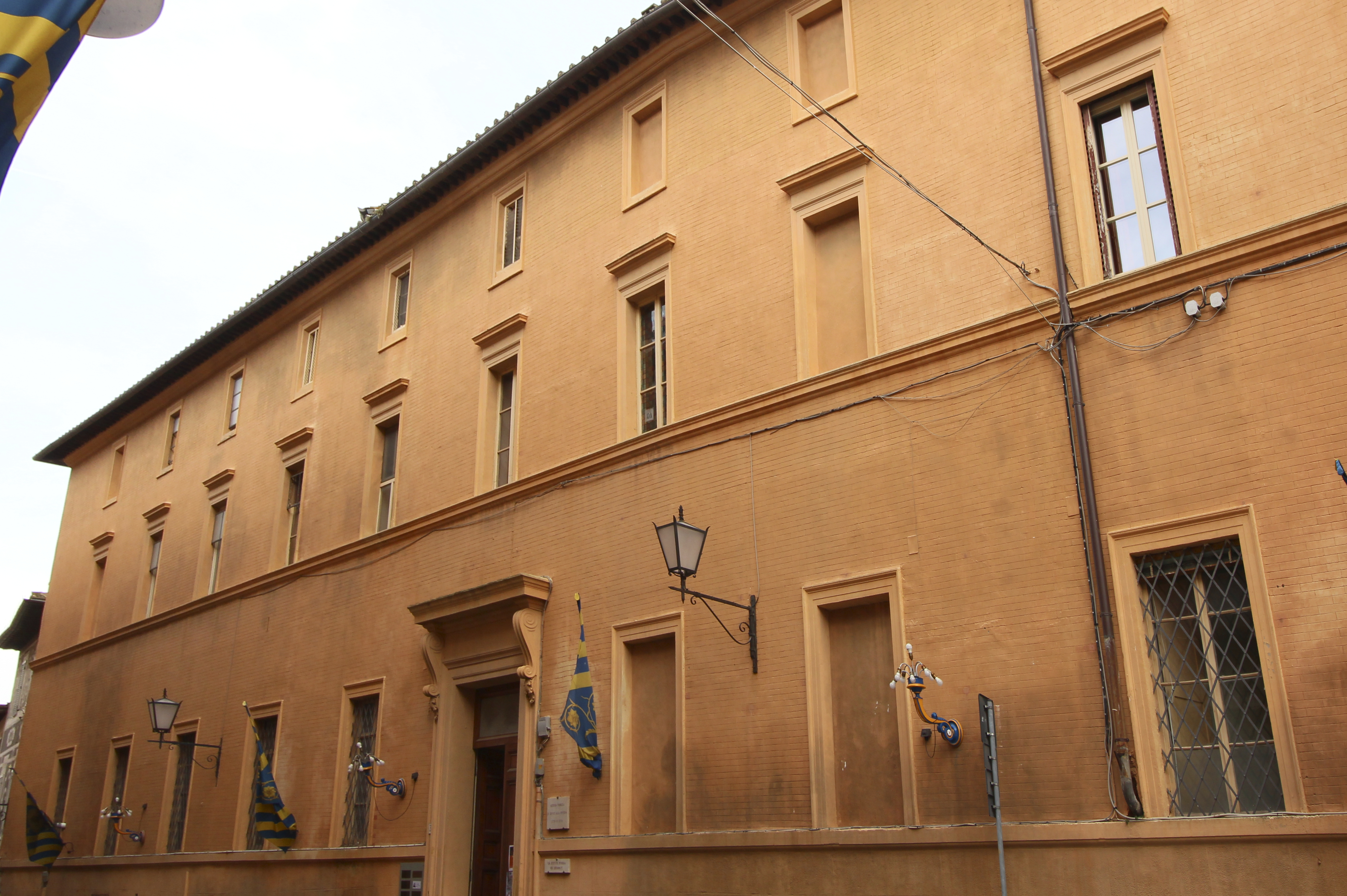
The Pendola Institute, Siena

The Pendola Institute is a foundation established for the treatment of severe congenital deafness, located on Via Tomasso Pendola #35-43 in the town center of Siena, region of Tuscany, Italy. It has a long history, starting as a charitable institution founded by the Genoese Scolopi priest Tommaso Pendola (1800–1883) in the early 1820s, and promulgating an oralist therapy for the deaf-mutes. The subsequent decades have modified the funding and scope of activities.

== History ==
The institute was founded with the patronage and guidance of Count Celso Petrucci Bargagli and other donors, and the leadership of Pendola. By 1828, Pendola became the first director of the Royal Institute for the Deaf and Dumb (Sordomuti) of Siena, approved by a decree of Grand Duke Leopold II. The building had been first located on Via San Pietro #39, but subsequently moved to the present site, the buildings that used to house the medieval Convent of Santa Margherita. The original building housed and educated 50 deafmute boys. By 1835, a parallel institute for girls was established under the direction of nuns of the Congregation of Daughters of Charity of San Vincenzo de’ Paoli, with the male component housed in a building on the same street (#62).

The oral method, fostered by Pendola, involved lip reading, was the main method used in Europe during the 19th and most of the 20th century. Some sources claim that Roman Catholicism favored oral tradition, versus sign language methods, because speech was required for confession. After Pendola's death, the name was changed by decree of Umberto I to the Royal Institute Pendola for Deaf Mutes. In 1980 the school was closed and the students were transferred mainly to Istituto Gualandi. The Istituto Pendola was in the process of modernization in 2014.
