= Irish Deaf Society =

Non-governmental organisation

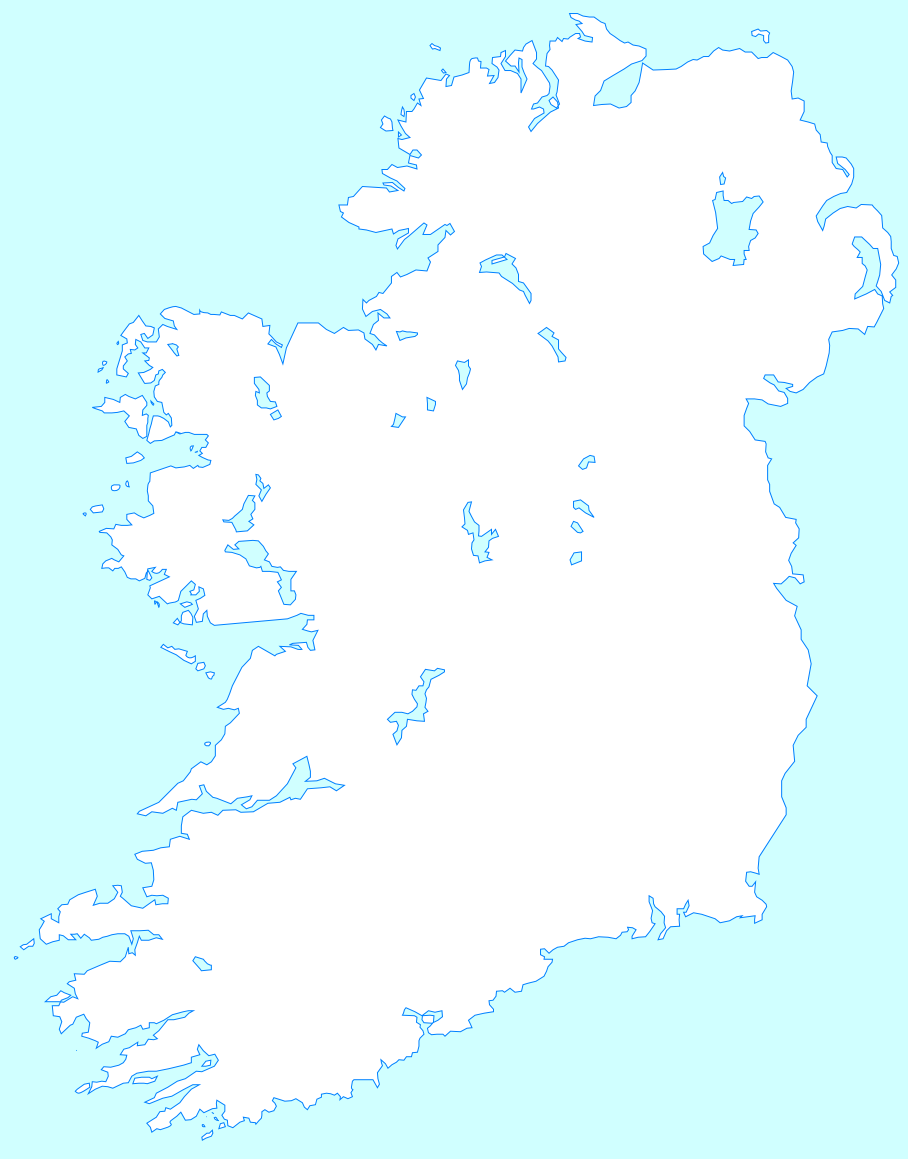
- Zone of influence
- Abbreviation: IDS
- Formation: 1981
- Type: Non-governmental organisation
- Purpose: Advocacy
- Headquarters: Dublin, Ireland
- Location: Deaf Village Ireland, Ratoath Road, Cabra, Dublin 7
- Coordinates: 53°21′51″N 6°18′04″W
- Region served: Ireland
- Members: Ordinary members Associate members Honorary members Non-residential members
- Official language: English
- Chief Executive Officer: John Mangan
- Main organ: Board of Directors
- Affiliations: World Federation of the Deaf; The European Union of the Deaf
- Staff: 15
- Website: www.irishdeafsociety.ie

The Irish Deaf Society (IDS) is the national representative organisation of the Deaf community in Ireland. It upholds the status of Irish Sign Language (ISL), which is the first and preferred language of Deaf people in Ireland. The Society, a growing and vital organization, provides a number of specific health, personal and social services to deaf adults, children and their families.

The IDS is recognised by the World Federation of the Deaf and The European Union of the Deaf, non-governmental organisations that represent National Associations of the Deaf at the world and European Union levels.

== Purpose ==
The IDS seeks to enhance the standard of living and quality of life for all Deaf people. The Society recognizes that the Deaf have traditionally faced the threats of poverty, limited employment opportunities, and other difficulties because of the lack of public understanding or appreciation for their essential needs. Therefore, their mission statement reads:

The Irish Deaf Society as Ireland's National Association OF the Deaf, strives to highlight the societal needs of all sections in the Deaf community, advocates the human rights of the Deaf through empowerment and achieve equal access in all aspects of life endowed by the full Irish citizenship. The empowerment and equality shall be through upholding the status of Irish Sign Language and its related culture and norms

== See also ==
- Deaf culture
- Hearing loss
- National Association of the Deaf (United States)
