= Somali National Association of the Deaf =

- Abbreviation: SONAD
- Formation: April 2007
- Purpose: Somali Deaf human rights and education
- Headquarters: Mogadishu, Banaadir, Somalia
- Location: Somalia
- Region served: National
- President: Bakar Ali

The Somali National Association of the Deaf (SONAD) is the national association for deaf people in Somalia, founded in April 2007. SONAD's mission is to ensure that deaf people in Somalia have rights like any other Somali citizen. This organization works to promote Somali Sign Language, deaf education, and human rights.

SONAD's headquarters is in Mogadishu, Somalia. SONAD is also a member of the World Federation of the Deaf.
