= Ukrainian Society of the Deaf =

Ukrainian non-governmental organisation

- Українське товариство глухих

- Flag of UTOH
- Formation: 4 June 1933; 92 years ago
- Type: NGO
- Headquarters: Kyiv, Ukraine
- Website: https://utog.org/

The Ukrainian Society of the Deaf (Ukrainian: Українське товариство глухих, romanized: Ukrayins'ke tovarystvo hlukhykh), abbreviated UTOH or UTOG (Ukrainian: УТОГ) is a Ukrainian non-governmental organisation responsible for promoting the rights of the deaf community in Ukraine. Its stated goal is to serve as "An organisational association of persons with hearing impairments and providing them with assistance in professional, labour, and social rehabilitation, protection of their legal rights and interests, and confirmation of their status as citizens fully integrated into society."

== History ==
The Ukrainian Society of the Deaf was founded by a directive of the All-Ukrainian Central Executive Committee on 4 June 1933, alongside the Ukrainian Association of the Blind (UTOS). Joining the World Federation of the Deaf in 1957, UTOH's existence was confirmed by the 5 October 1992 law of the Verkhovna Rada (Ukraine's parliament) "On Citizens' Associations".

During the 2022 Russian invasion of Ukraine, UTOH's activities were significantly impacted. Along with UTOS, local offices of UTOH received aid, including in Mykolaiv and Kostiantynivka.

== Activities ==
UTOH's primary goal, as described on their website, is to serve as "An organisational association of persons with hearing impairments and providing them with assistance in professional, labour, and social rehabilitation, protection of their legal rights and interests, and confirmation of their status as citizens fully integrated into society." Among their activities are searching for deaf persons who have gone missing as a result of the Russo-Ukrainian War, translation of government information into Ukrainian Sign Language, and teaching of Ukrainian Sign Language.

== Recognition ==
UTOH has been recognised as critical to protecting and enhancing the rights of the deaf in Ukraine, particularly in the wake of the 2022 Russian invasion of Ukraine. The World Federation of the Deaf launched a donation campaign for UTOH in order to assist with operations during the war.

Since 2018, the Government of Ukraine has supplied funding to UTOH and UTOS.
