= Global Coalition of Parents of Children who are Deaf or Hard of Hearing =

The Global Coalition of Parents of Children who are Deaf or Hard of Hearing (GPODHH) is an international collaboration of parent-led support groups for families with children who are deaf or hard of hearing and provides support, information, and systemic advocacy. GPODHH advocates for the need for families to be active collaborators and partners throughout the development of new programs, services and systems directed to the lives of children who are deaf or hard of hearing and their families.

Members of GPODHH include parent-led support groups in the USA, European Union, Africa, India and Australasia. The coalition aims to empower parents to become advocates for their children, to improve their access to early intervention and education, and to promote their rights and well-being. Through its network of member organizations, GPODHH fosters collaboration and knowledge-sharing among parents organizations and parent leaders in the field of deafness and hearing loss. GPODHH is involved in activities to raise awareness about the unique needs and challenges facing children who are deaf or hard of hearing and their families, and to promote inclusion and equality for all.

GPODHH is a member of the World Hearing Forum, hosted by the World Health Organization, Cochlear Implant International Community of Action (CIICA) and are members of the Advisory Committee reviewing and updating the "Best Practices in Family-Centered Early Intervention for Children who are Deaf or Hard of Hearing: An International Consensus Statement". Members of GPODHH were contributors to the World Report on Hearing published by the World Health Organization on World Hearing Day in 2021.

== See also ==
- Deaf culture
- Deaf rights movement
- Sign language
- Telecommunications for the deaf
- Closed captioning
