= Women with Disabilities Australia =

Australian disability organization

- Abbreviation: WWDA
- Formation: 1980s
- Website: wwda.org.au
- Formerly called: Women with Disabilities Feminist Collective

The Women with Disabilities Australia (WWDA), formerly known as the Women with Disabilities Feminist Collective (WDFC), is an Australian social support organization representing women, girls, feminine identifying, and non-binary people with disabilities, which first engaged in feminist political action in the 1980s.

Lesley Hall was one of the founders. One of its earliest actions was to protest the Miss Australia Quest, a beauty contest which raised money for what was then known as the Spastic Society. The WWDA objected to the contest's focus on physical perfection "as the norm all must maintain if they are to be fully accepted into society." The group disrupted the 1982 Miss Victoria contest, invading the stage with a banner reading "Equality Not Charity."
