= Tommaso Silvestri–ISISS Magarotto School =

School in Rome, Italy

The Tommaso Silvestri–ISISS Magarotto School is a school in Rome, Italy. It was historically a residential school for deaf students, but now enrolls both deaf and hearing students in a co-enrollment model. It is part of the State Institute for Specialized Education for the Deaf (ISISS).

As of 2017, it enrolled 500 students from kindergarten through secondary school, 200 of whom were deaf.

== History ==
In 1700, Father Tommasso Silvestri traveled to Paris to learn about deaf education from Abbot l’Épée. His travel was funded by lawyer Pasquel Di Pietro. He then returned to Rome and opened a school for deaf children, originally with 8 students. After several moves, it finally relocated to its current location in the Via Nomentana in 1889.

Instruction was originally bilingual, with a combination of spoken Italian and sign language. But after the Milan conference in 1880, the school switched to an oralism approach. Oral communication was required in classes, although students did use sign outside the classroom and during vocational workshops.

Numbers of pupils increased over the years, reaching a peak of over 200 in 1965. But after Law 517 allowed deaf and otherwise disabled children to be enrolled in mainstream schools, the number of students decreased significantly, reaching 17 in 1990.

In the 1990s, the school responded to this decline by starting a co-enrollment approach. This program includes both deaf and hearing students, all of whom learn sign language.

Kindergarten classes are capped at 15 students, 2 to 5 of which are deaf; primary school classes have 12 or fewer students, 2 to 4 of which are deaf.
