= Yakov Batyuk =

Ukrainian Soviet resistance leader in World War II

Hero of the Soviet Union Yakov Batyuk
- Я́ків Батю́к
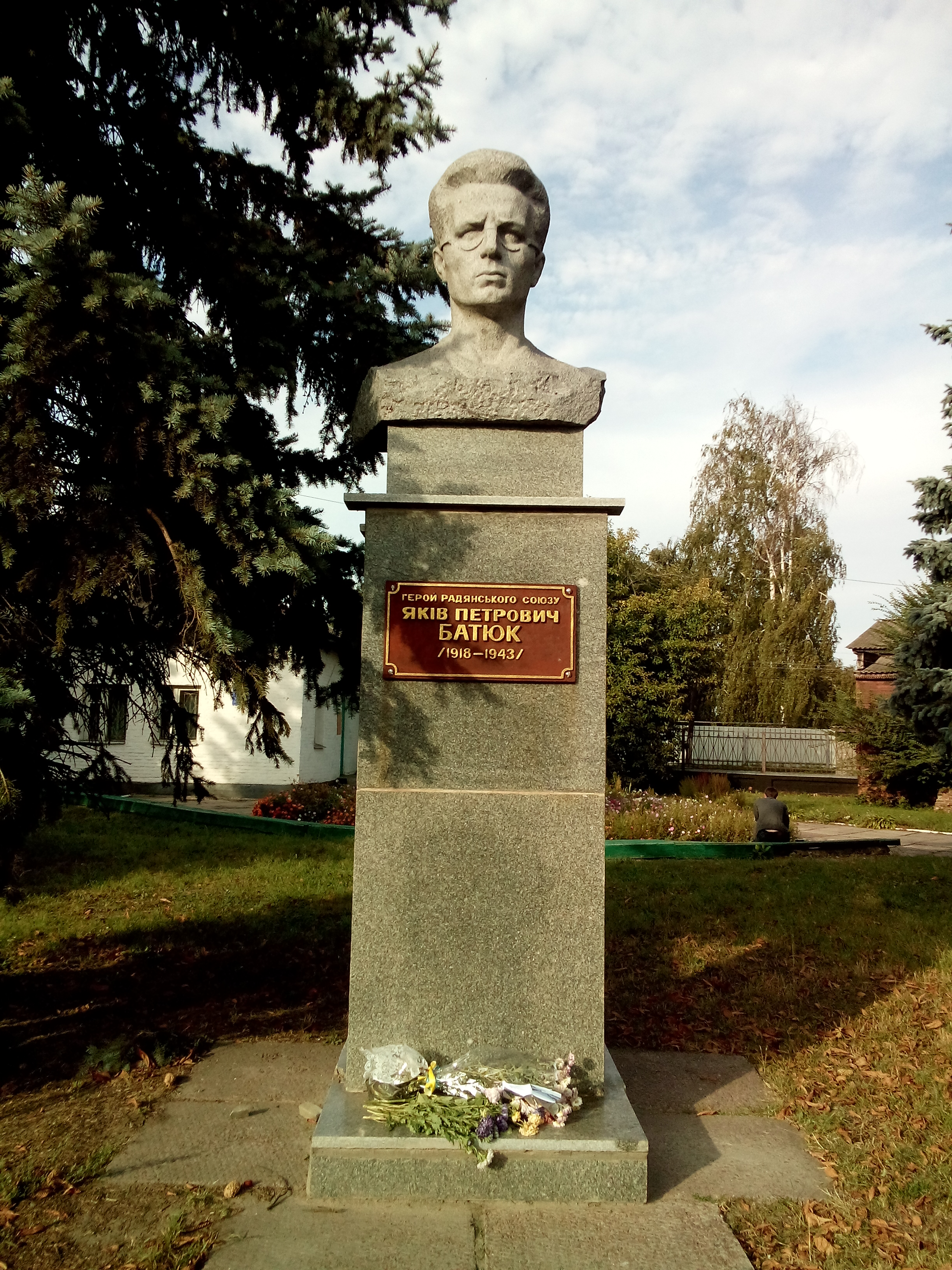
- Monument to Batyuk in Nizhyn
- Born: Yakov Petrovich Batyuk; 12 May 1918; Ryzhany, Volhynia Governorate, Ukrainian People's Republic
- Died: 7 September 1943 (aged 25); Nischyn, Reichskommissariat Ukraine, Nazi Germany
- Cause of death: Executed by the Gestapo
- Education: University of Kyiv
- Occupation: Lawyer
- Organization: Komsomol
- Movement: Anti-Nazism
- Resistance
- Allegiance: Third International
- Branch: Soviet partisans
- Conflicts: Operation Barbarossa; Eastern Front
- Awards: Medal "To a Partisan of the Patriotic War"; Order of Lenin

Yakov Petrovich Batyuk (Ukrainian: Яків Петрович Батюк; May 12, 1918 – September 7, 1943) was a Ukrainian Soviet member of the Komsomol and leader of the anti-fascist Komsomol underground in the city of Nizhyn during the Second World War.

== Early life and career ==
Batyuk was born into a peasant family in the village of Ryzhany,^{α} Zhitomirsky Uyezd, Volhynia Governorate, Ukrainian People's Republic.

In early childhood, as a result of an accident, he completely lost his sight, but after graduating from high school, he entered the law faculty of Kyiv University. He received a law degree in 1940 and was sent to the Chernihiv region of the Ukrainian SSR as a lawyer of the Nizhyn city bar association. Within a short time, he earned the respect of colleagues and residents of the city.

== Anti-fascist resistance ==
After the outbreak of World War II, Batyuk was involved in underground work. Nizhyn was occupied by Nazi Germany on September 13, 1941. Under these conditions, Batyuk created an underground organization. Taking orders for horse harness from the occupation authorities, the underground workers impregnated the finished rope products with a special chemical solution prepared by Batyuk. When the solution-treated harness became wet with rain or sweat, the chemicals irritated the horses' skin and they were out of action. About nine thousand sets of such harness were made. The authorities sought to prevent further sabotage by attaching the harness manufacturing operation to other enterprises, so Batyuk organized a workers' protest, but was removed from his post. In response, he stepped up underground activities.

After learning about the existence of a partisan detachment in the forest near Nizhyn, in March 1942 Batyuk met with its commander, secretary of the Nosovsky underground district committee of the party Stratilat. After that, the underground workers launched agitation and propaganda work among the population.

== Capture and death ==
The Gestapo sought out the Nizhyn resistance, and on August 25, 1943, Batyuk and most of the members of the Komsomol youth organization under his leadership were arrested. Only a small group were able to escape from the city and join the partisan detachment. On the night of September 6–7, all 26 of the arrested underground workers were taken in two trucks to the railway station, where they were shot at a destroyed water pump. On September 15, Nizhyn was liberated.

The bodies of the executed were reburied in a mass grave at the Central (Trinity) cemetery in Nizhyn.

By a decree of the Presidium of the Supreme Soviet of the Soviet Union dated May 8, 1965, Batyuk Yakov Petrovich was posthumously awarded the title of Hero of the Soviet Union.

== Notes ==
^α Now Zhytomyr Raion, Zhytomyr Oblast, Ukraine.
