= Cesare Magarotto =

Cesare Magarotto (1917–2006) was one of the founders of World Federation of the Deaf (WFD), its first General Secretary (1951–1987) and the son of Antonio Magarotto, the founder of the Italian National Agency for the Deaf (ENS).

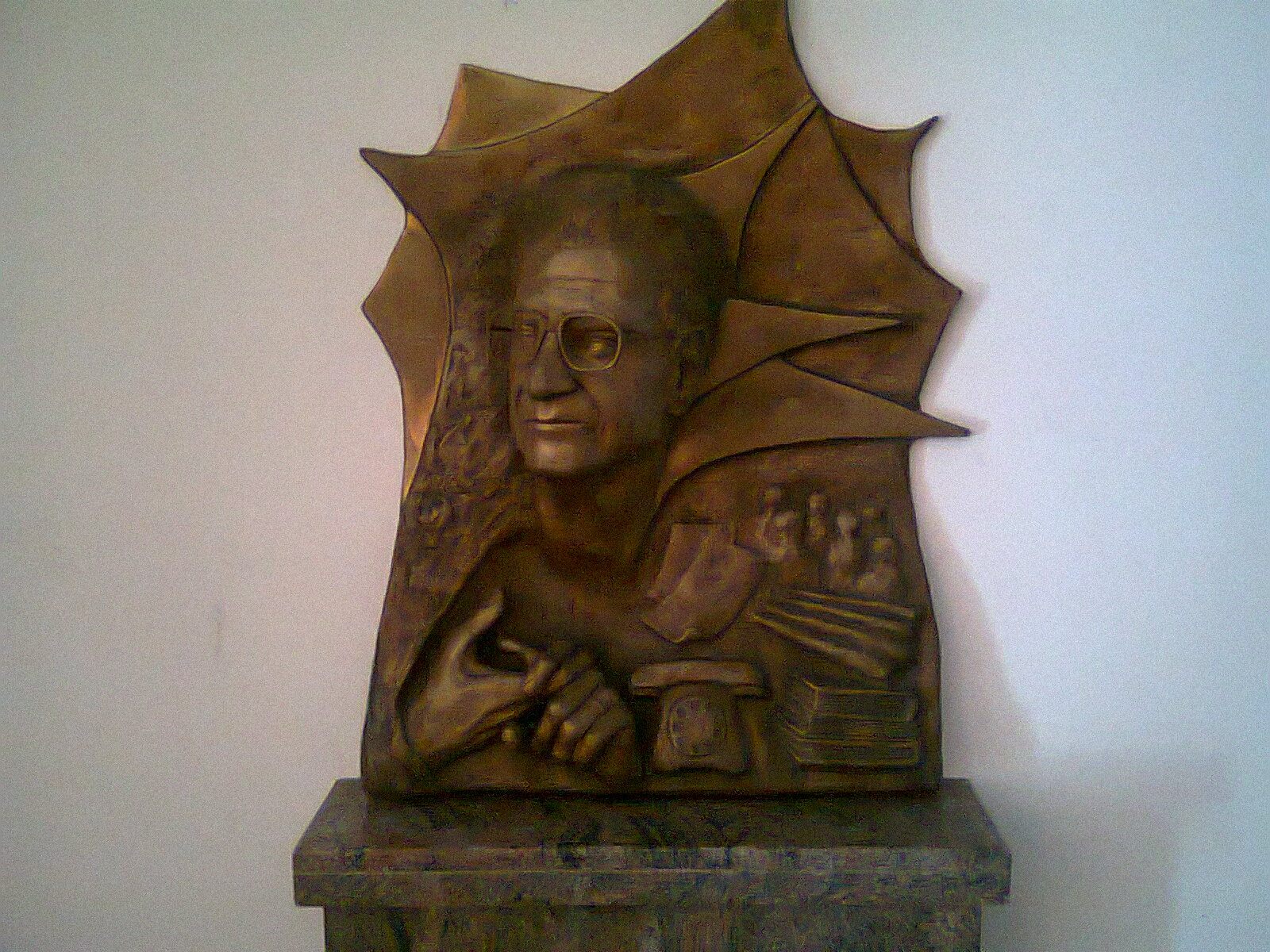
Monumento a Cesare Magarotto, was one of the founders of World Federation of the Deaf (WFD)
