= Italian National Agency for the Deaf =

Italian national association for the deaf

Ente Nazionale Sordi (ENS)
- Ente Nazionale per la protezione e l'assistenza dei Sordi ETS APS
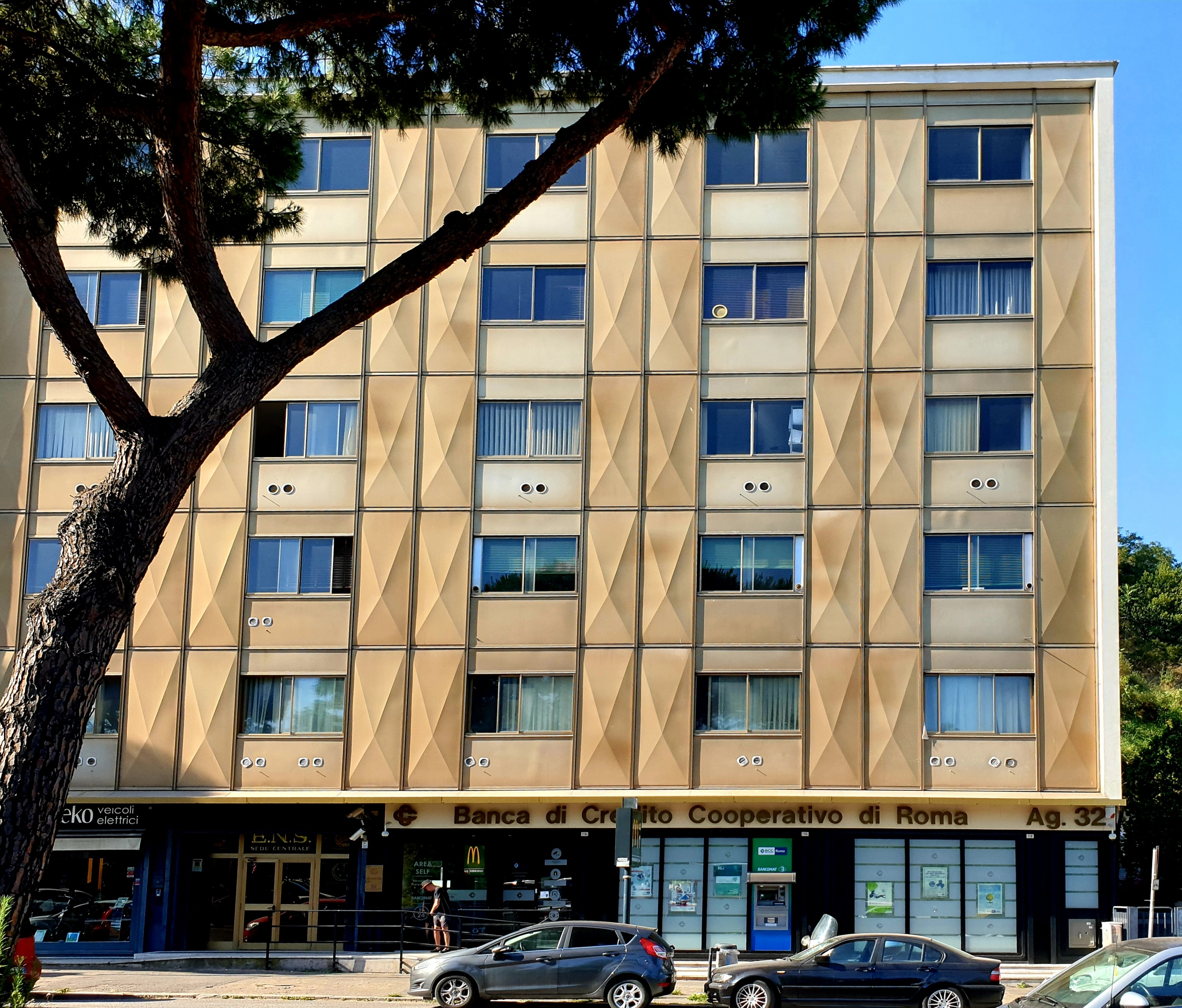
- ENS headquarters in Rome
- Formation: 24 September 1932
- Type: Non-profit organization
- Purpose: Protection, assistance, and social integration of deaf people in Italy
- Headquarters: Via Gregorio VII, 120, Rome, Italy
- Location: Italy
- Region served: Italy
- Services: Advocacy, support services, promotion of LIS, cultural activities
- Members: 22,258 (as of 2022)
- Key people: Raffaele Angelo Cagnazzo (President, as of 2021)
- Staff: 17 (central office)
- Website: www.ens.it

The Italian National Agency for the protection and assistance of the Deaf (ENS) is the oldest and principal national association representing the deaf community in Italy. Founded in 1932, its mission is to protect the rights of deaf individuals, promote their social integration, autonomy, and full human development. As of 16 June 2022, it is registered in the National Single Register of the Third Sector as a social promotion association. ENS is also a member of the World Federation of the Deaf (WFD) and European Union of the Deaf (EUD, 1985).

== History ==
=== Foundation ===
The ENS was established on 24 September 1932, in Padua, through the merger of several existing deaf associations, with the aim of creating a single national body to represent Italian deaf people. The initiative was spearheaded by Antonio Magarotto, who cleverly circumvented a ban on national deaf conventions imposed by the Fascist regime by convening representatives under the pretext of celebrating the seventh centenary of the death of Anthony of Padua. During this meeting (24–26 September 1932), after intense discussions between previously rival federations, the "Pact of Padua" was signed, establishing the unified body.

At the beginning of the deaf association movement, deaf individuals in Italy faced significant legal and social discrimination, often being considered legally incompetent and excluded from many civil rights and educational opportunities outside of religious institutions or private tutoring. The social approach to deafness began to change in Italy from 1784, following the pioneering work of educator Tommaso Silvestri, leading to the establishment of schools for the deaf in Rome and other cities.

=== Early associations and unification ===
The first known mutual aid society for the deaf in Italy was the Società di mutuo soccorso Cardano, founded in Milan in 1874. This spurred the creation of similar societies in Turin, Genoa, and elsewhere. The first international congress of the deaf-mute was held in Rome in 1911. After World War I, efforts to reconnect these associations were led by Giuseppe Enrico Prestini, culminating in the establishment of the Unione Italiana Sordomuti in Rome. A 1920 congress in Genoa led to the formation of the Federazione italiana delle associazioni fra i sordomuti (FIAS).

A subsequent congress in Rome in 1922 outlined key demands: compulsory education, job placement, and legal assistance for deaf workers. In 1923, largely due to FIAS's advocacy, Italy passed a law mandating compulsory education for the deaf. However, disagreements over program priorities and fundamental concepts related to deafness led to a schism, with some societies forming a rival national body, the Unione sordomuti italiani, in 1924. These divisions deepened, with separate congresses defining differing approaches: one emphasizing the distinct cultural identity of the deaf, the other focusing on integration and bridging the gap with the hearing world. In 1930, the Fascist government banned national conventions for deaf associations, a prohibition circumvented by Magarotto's 1932 Padua meeting which led to the ENS's foundation.

=== Legal recognition and evolution ===
Official recognition for the ENS came with Law No. 889 of 12 May 1942, which established it as a Ente morale (a type of public organization). A crucial prior achievement, influenced by the unified efforts, was the 1938 abrogation of Italian Civil Code provisions that legally incapacitated deaf individuals, granting them full legal capacity and civil rights.

Law No. 698 of 21 August 1950, strongly advocated by then-director Cesare Magarotto (son of Antonio), reorganized the ENS, recognizing it as a public law legal entity responsible for representing and protecting all Italian deaf individuals. Following administrative decentralization (DPR 616/1977), the ENS, like other historical disability associations, was transformed into a private law moral entity in 1979, while retaining its nationally recognized roles of representation and protection.

A significant legislative victory for the deaf community, resulting from ENS advocacy, was Law No. 95 of 20 February 2006, which officially replaced the term sordomuto (deaf-mute) with sordo (deaf) in all Italian legislation.

== Mission ==
The core mission of the ENS is to promote the social integration, identity, autonomy, and full human potential of deaf people within Italian society. It acts as the primary national body for the protection and assistance of the deaf community. The ENS is registered in the National Single Register of the Third Sector (RUNTS) as a social promotion association. Its functions include representing and safeguarding the rights of individuals with hearing disabilities, as mandated by its founding legislation and subsequent decrees.

The ENS is also recognized as a Meritorious Association by the Italian Paralympic Committee (CIP) and is registered in the roster of Universal Civil Service entities.

== Organization ==
The ENS operates nationally through a network of 104 provincial sections, 18 regional councils, and various local and inter-municipal representations.

=== Central Bodies ===
- National Congress
- National Assembly
- Governing Council
- National President
- Board of Arbitrators (Collegio dei probiviri)
- Central Control Body

=== Peripheral Bodies ===
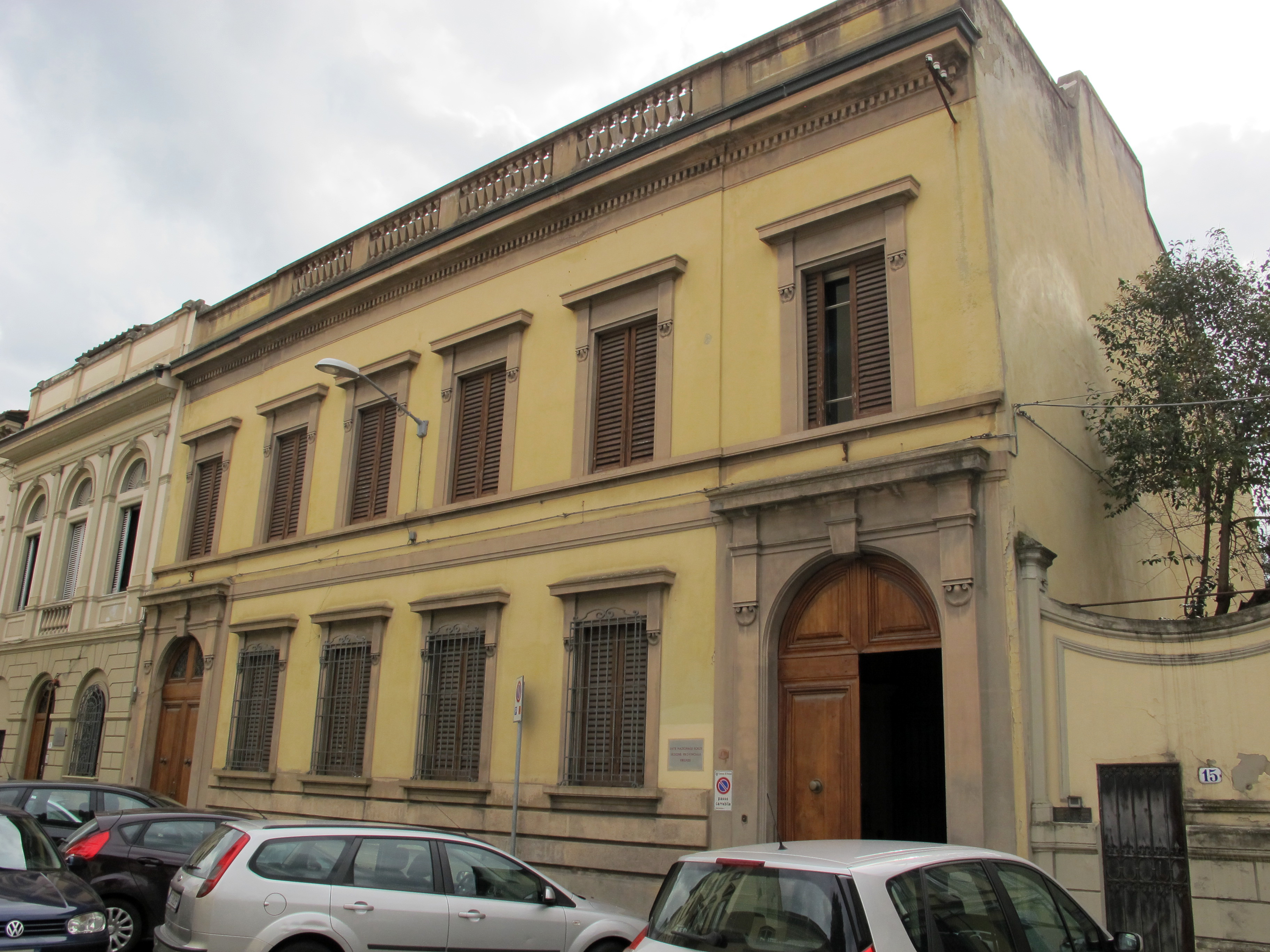
The ENS provincial headquarters in Florence

- Regional Congresses and Assemblies
- Regional Councils and Presidents
- Regional Boards of Auditors (Collegi regionali dei sindaci)
- Regional Secretaries
- Provincial Congresses and Assemblies
- Provincial Councils and Presidents
- Inter-municipal and Local Representatives and Coordinators

=== Thematic Areas ===
The ENS organizes its activities into several key areas, including:

- Employment policies, civil service, budget of the Italian Deaf Youth Committee (CGSI).
- History of the Deaf, senior citizens, library, spiritual sector, and equal opportunities.
- Multimedia, leisure, cinema, theatre, and video library.
- School and university, family policies, relations with CGSI.
- Coordination of regional observatories, health, peripheral legislative coordination, fundraising, special events project coordination.
- Sports policies, international relations (with WFD and EUD), LIS, and training.

=== Specialized Centers ===
- "Vittorio Ieralla" Documentation Center and Library
- Video Production Center – "I Sordi Italiani" Museum
- "Francesco Rubino" International Museum of Deaf Sports

== Affiliations ==
The ENS is a founding member of the World Federation of the Deaf (WFD), established in Rome in 1951 and recognized by major international organizations, including the United Nations. It has also been a member of the European Union of the Deaf (EUD) since 1985 and aligns its activities with European Union directives.

Nationally, ENS is a founding member of FAND (Federazione tra le associazioni nazionali delle persone con disabilità), a federation of historical Italian disability advocacy organizations, alongside UICI (Italian Union of the Blind and Partially Sighted), ANMIC (National Association of Mutilated and Invalid Civilians), ANMIL (National Association of Workers Mutilated and Disabled at Work), and UNMS (National Union of Mutilated for Service). The ENS is also a member of the FID (Forum Italiano sulla Disabilità), the European Disability Forum (EDF), and the Forum Nazionale del Terzo Settore.

== Members ==
Membership numbers over the years include:

- 2006: 30,547
- 2007: 30,256
- 2008: 30,067
- 2009: 29,477
- 2010: 28,732
- 2011: 28,357
- 2012: 25,618
- 2013: 25,756
- 2014: 25,757
- 2015: 25,897
- 2017: 25,947
- 2018: 25,658
- 2019: 24,975
- 2020: 23,675
- 2021: 21,782
- 2022: 22,258

== Presidents ==
- Giovanni De Carlis (1948–1950)
- Vittorio Ieralla (1950–1982)
- Furio Bonora (1982–1987)
- Armando Giuranna (1987–1995)
- Ida Collu (1995–2011)
- Giuseppe Petrucci (2011–2021)
- Raffaele Angelo Cagnazzo (2021–present)

== Congresses ==
The ENS holds national congresses to discuss policy and elect leadership. Notable recent congresses include:

- XXIII Congress: Santa Margherita di Pula, 2008
- XXIV Congress: Rocca di Papa, 2011
- XXV Congress: Montesilvano, 2015
- XXVI Congress: Rome, 30–31 July 2021
- XXVII Congress (Extraordinary): Isola delle Femmine, 12–15 May 2022
- XXVIII Congress (Extraordinary): Rome, 23 July 2022

== Museum and archive ==
Within its headquarters, the ENS maintains a museum dedicated to the pioneers who founded both the ENS and the World Federation of the Deaf. It also houses an archive of historical documents, photographs, and a periodical library (emeroteca).

== In popular culture ==
=== Comics ===
In 2019, the graphic novel Fratelli di Silenzio was published, recounting the story of Antonio Magarotto and the founding of the unified national organization for deaf Italians.

=== Journal ===
Parole & Segni was a bimonthly Italian magazine published by ENS for its members. It provided information on deafness, relevant legislation, association news, activities of provincial sections and the youth committee, sports, and cultural topics.

== See also ==
- Italian Sign Language
- World Federation of the Deaf
- European Union of the Deaf
