= European Union of the Deaf =

- - Belarusian: Еўрапейская федэрацыя глухіх
  - Spanish: Union Europea de Sordos
  - French: Union européenne des sourds
  - Italian: Unione Europea dei Sordi
  - Portuguese: União Europeia de Surdos
  - Russian: Европейская федерация глухих
- EUD Members: 32 Full Members: Austria; Belgium; Bulgaria; Croatia; Cyprus; Czech Republic; Denmark; Estonia; Finland; France; Germany; Greece; Hungary; Iceland; Ireland; Italy; Latvia; Lithuania; Luxembourg; Malta; Netherlands; Norway; Poland; Portugal; Romania; Slovakia; Slovenia; Spain; Sweden; Switzerland; United Kingdom; 1 Affiliated Member: Ukraine

Leaders
  - President: Sofia Isari
  - Executive Director: Frankie Picron

Establishment
  - Founded: 1985
- Website eud.eu

The European Union of the Deaf (EUD) is a supraorganization comprising each respective National Association of the Deaf of the member states of the European Union. The EUD is a nonprofit organization founded in 1985 and is a Regional Co-operating Member of the World Federation of the Deaf (WFD), a full member of the European Disability Forum (EDF) and has a participatory status with the Council of Europe (CoE). Originally founded as the European Regional Secretariat of the World Federation of the Deaf (ERS),, delegates voted in 1988 to rename it to the European Community Regional Secretariat of the World Federation of the Deaf (ECRS) and in 1994 to the current European Union of the Deaf (EUD).

EUD's goals include equality for Deaf people in employment, education, and public as well as private life, and the right to use indigenous sign language.

As of June 2026, the European Union of the Deaf has 32 full members from 31 countries and one affiliate member, with headquarters in Brussels, Belgium.

== History ==
Presidents:

- 2022–present: Sofia Isari (Greece)
- 2013–2022: Markku Jokinen (Finland)
- 2007–2013: Berglind Stefánsdóttir (Iceland)
- 2005–2007: Helga Stevens (Belgium)
- 1990–2005: Knud Søndergaard (Denmark)
- 1989–1989: Jeff Labes (France)
- 1985–1989: Jock Young (United Kingdom)

== Members ==
Full members:

Association	Country
Austrian Federation of the Deaf	Austria
Deaf Flanders	Belgium
French-speaking Federation of the Deaf Belgians	Belgium
Union of the Deaf in Bulgaria	Bulgaria
Croatian Association of the Deaf and Hard of Hearing	Croatia
Cyprus Deaf Federation	Cyprus
Czech Republic Union of Deaf and Hard of Hearing	Czech Republic
Danish Deaf Association	Denmark
Estonian Association of the Deaf	Estonia
Finnish Association of the Deaf	Finland
National Federation of France for the Deaf	France
German Federation of the Deaf	Germany
Hellenic Federation of the Deaf	Greece
Hungarian Association of the Deaf and Hard of Hearing	Hungary
Icelandic Association of the Deaf	Iceland
Irish Deaf Society	Ireland
Italian National Agency for the protection and assistance of the Deaf	Italy
Latvian Association of the Deaf	Latvia
Lithuanian Deaf Association	Lithuania
Luxembourgian Association of the Deaf and hard of hearing	Luxembourg
Maltese Deaf People's Association	Malta
Deaf Association of the Netherlands	Netherlands
Norwegian Association of the Deaf	Norway
Board of the Polish Association of the Deaf	Poland
Portuguese Federation of Associations of the Deaf	Portugal
Romanian National Association for the Deaf	Romania
Slovak Association of the Deaf	Slovakia
Slovenian Association of the Deaf and Hard of Hearing	Slovenia
National Confederation of Deaf People in Spain	Spain
Swedish National Association of the Deaf	Sweden
Swiss Federation of the Deaf	Switzerland
British Deaf Association	United Kingdom

Affiliated Members:

Association	Country
Ukrainian Society of the Deaf	Ukraine

== See also ==
- International Federation of Hard of Hearing Young People
- Languages of the European Union
- World Federation of the Deaf
