= World Federation of the Deaf =

International non-governmental organization

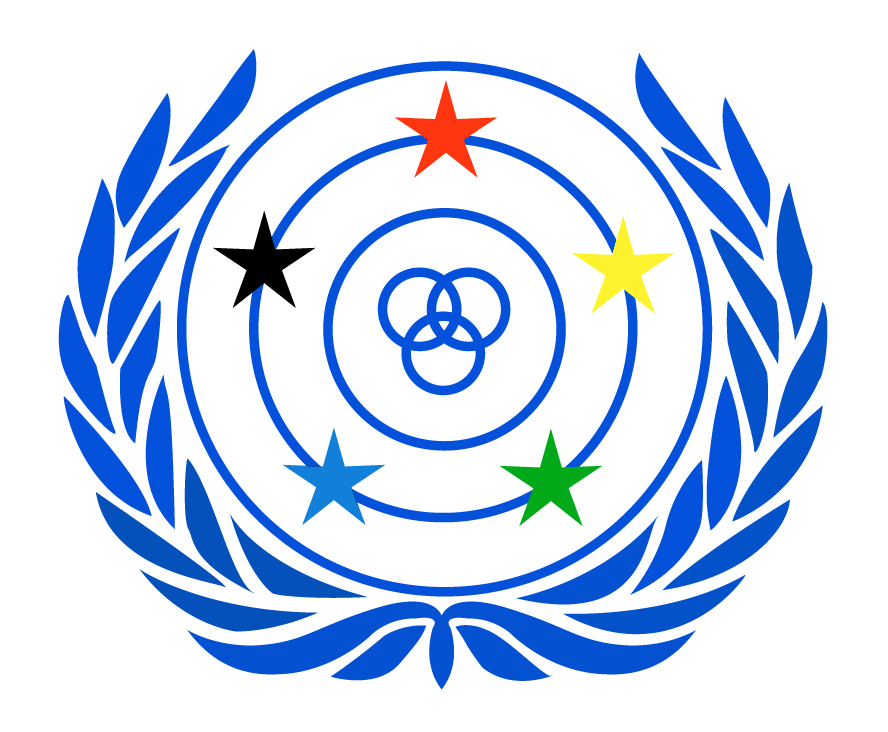
- Formation: September 23, 1951; 75 years ago
- Type: International nongovernmental organization
- Purpose: Human, civil, and linguistic rights of deaf people
- Headquarters: Helsinki, Finland
- Location(s): Light House, Ilkantie 4 Haaga, Helsinki, Finland
- Coordinates: 60.221728°N 24.902643°E
- Region served: International
- President: Joseph Murray
- Vice president: Kasper Bergmann
- Website: wfdeaf.org

The World Federation of the Deaf (WFD) is an international non-governmental organization that acts as a peak body for national associations of Deaf people, with a focus on deaf people who use sign language and their family and friends. WFD aims to promote the human rights of deaf people worldwide, by working closely with the United Nations (with which it has consultative status) and various UN agencies such as the International Labour Organization and the World Health Organization. WFD is also a member of the International Disability Alliance (IDA).

As of September 19, 2023, 11 board members are all deaf. The offices are located in Helsinki, Finland.

== History ==
The WFD was established in September 1951 in Rome, Italy, at the first World Deaf Congress, under the auspices of Ente Nazionale Sordomuti (ENS), the Italian Deaf Association. The first president of WFD was Professor Vittorio Ieralla, who was also, at that time, president of the ENS. The congress was attended by representatives from 25 countries.

Dr. Cesare Magarotto was one of the founders of World Federation of the Deaf and its first general secretary (1951-1987) along with Vittorio Ieralla who was elected as the president from 1951 to 1955.

Ieralla and Magarotto successfully convinced the Italian government to support their efforts to establish a WFD general secretariat in Rome, in 1951. With continued support from the Italian government and later with the ENS, the WFD general secretariat was able to establish informative and advocacy networks, with national federations of the deaf around the world. Decades later, the WFD general secretariat relocated to Finland (1987), with support from the Finnish government and the Finnish national of the deaf led by the former WFD general secretary Dr. Liisa Kauppinen (WFD president emeritius).

== Status ==
WFD has B-category status with the United Nations and is represented on the following groups':

- Economic and Social Council
- Regional commissions
- Economic Commission for Africa
- Economic Commission for Europe
- Economic Commission for Latin America and the Caribbean
- Economic Commission and Social Commission for Asia and the Pacific
- Economic and Social Commission for Western Asia
- Panel of Experts on the UN Standard Rules for the Equalization of Opportunities for Persons with Disabilities
- Office of the United Nations High Commissioner for Human Rights
- United Nations Educational, Scientific and Cultural Organization
- International Labour Organization
- World Health Organization
- World Bank
- Council of Europe

WFD provides expert advice on Deaf issues in its relationship with other international organizations and professional groups.

The legal seat of WFD is in Helsinki, Finland.

== Aims and objectives ==
At present, emphasis is placed on the following areas:

1. Improve the status of national sign languages,
2. Better education for deaf people,
3. Improve access to information and services
4. Improve human rights for deaf people in developing countries
5. Promote the establishment of deaf organisations where none currently exist

== Constituency ==
The WFD claims to represent 70 million deaf people worldwide, of which more than 80 percent live in developing countries. This is done mainly through membership of national deaf organisations, where such organisations exist. As of February 2009, 130 national associations are members. Associate members, international members and individual members also make up WFD's membership base.

List of member associations (as of June 2021):

Associations	Country
Afghanistan National Association of the Deaf	Afghanistan
Albanian National Association of the Deaf	Albania
Fédération Nationale des Sourds d'Algérie	Algeria
Confederación Argentina de Sordomudos	Argentina
Armenian Deaf Society	Armenia
Deaf Australia	Australia
Austrian Federation of the Deaf	Austria
Public Association "Support for the Deaf"	Azerbaijan
Bangladesh National Federation of the Deaf	Bangladesh
Belarusian Society of the Deaf	Belarus
French-speaking Federation of the Deaf Belgians	Belgium
Deaf Flanders	Belgium
Association Nationale des Sourds du Benin	Benin
Federación Boliviana de Sordos	Bolivia
Association of the Deaf and Hard of Hearing	Bosnia and Herzegovina
Botswana Association of the Deaf	Botswana
Federação Nacional de Educação e Integração dos Surdos	Brazil
Union of the Deaf in Bulgaria	Bulgaria
Union Nationale des Associations des Deficients Auditifs du Burkina	Burkina Faso
Association Nationale des Sourds du Burundi	Burundi
Association Nationale Des Sourds du Cameroon	Cameroon
Canadian Association of the Deaf	Canada
Chadian National Association of the Hearing Impaired	Chad
Asociación de Sordos de Chile	Chile
China Association of the Deaf	China
Federación Nacional de Sordos de Colombia	Colombia
Association Nationale des Sourds du Congo	Democratic Republic of Congo
Association Nationale des Sourds et Deficients Auditifs du Congo	Republic of Congo
Asociación Nacional de Sordos de Costa Rica	Costa Rica
Croatian Association of the Deaf and Hard of Hearing	Croatia
Asociación Nacional de Sordos de Cuba	Cuba
Cyprus Deaf Federation	Cyprus
Union of the Deaf and Hard of Hearing in the Czech Republic	Czech Republic
Danske Døves Landsforbund	Denmark
Asociación Nacional de Sordos de la Republica Dominicana	Dominican Republic
Federación Nacional de Sordos de Ecuador	Ecuador
Asociación Salvadoreña de Sordos	El Salvador
National Deaf Association of Eritrea	Eritrea
Estonian Association of the Deaf (Eesti Kurtide Liit)	Estonia
Swaziland National Association of the Deaf	Eswatini
Ethiopian National Association of the Deaf	Ethiopia
Fiji Association of the Deaf	Fiji
Finnish Association of the Deaf	Finland
National Federation of France for the Deaf	France
Gambia Association of the Deaf and Hard of Hearing	Gambia
Union of the Deaf of Georgia	Georgia
German Federation of the Deaf	Germany
Ghana National Association of the Deaf	Ghana
Hellenic Federation of the Deaf	Greece
Asociación de Sordos de Guatemala	Guatemala
Association Guinéenne des Sourds	Guinea
Asociación Nacional de Sordos de Honduras	Honduras
Hong Kong Association of the Deaf	Hong Kong
Hungarian Association of the Deaf and Hard of Hearing	Hungary
Felag heyrnarlausra	Iceland
All India Federation of the Deaf	India
Indonesian Association for the Welfare of the Deaf	Indonesia
Iranian National Center of the Deaf	Iran
Irish Deaf Society	Ireland
Association of the Deaf in Israel	Israel
Ente Nazionale Sordi	Italy
Association Nationale des Sourds de Côte d'Ivoire	Ivory Coast
Japanese Federation of the Deaf	Japan
Kazakhstan Society of the Deaf	Kazakhstan
Kenya National Association of the Deaf	Kenya
Kosovar Association of the Deaf (KAD)	Kosovo
Kuwait Club for the Deaf	Kuwait
Latvian Association of the Deaf	Latvia
Association de L'Oeuvre des Sourds-Muets au Liban	Lebanon
National Association of the Deaf Lesotho	Lesotho
Liberia National Association of the Deaf, Inc	Liberia
Libyan General Federation of Deaf Societies	Libya
Lithuanian Deaf Association - Lietuvos kurčiųjų draugija	Lithuania
Macau Deaf Association	Macau
Federation of the Deaf in Madagascar	Madagascar
Malawi National Association of the Deaf	Malawi
Malaysia Federation of the Deaf	Malaysia
Mali Association of the Deaf (A.MA.Sourds)	Mali
Deaf People Association	Malta
Federación Mexicana de Sordos	Mexico
Association of the Deaf of Republic Moldova	Moldova
Mongolian Association of the Deaf	Mongolia
Fédération Nationale des Sourds du Maroc	Morocco
Association of the Deaf in Mozambique	Mozambique
Namibian National Association of the Deaf	Namibia
Nepal Deaf Federation	Nepal
Dovenschap	Netherlands
Deaf Aotearoa New Zealand	New Zealand
Asociación Nacional de Sordos de Nicaragua	Nicaragua
Association des Sourds du Niger	Niger
Nigeria National Association of the Deaf	Nigeria
Association of the Deaf and Hard of Hearing of Macedonija	North Macedonia
Norwegian Association of the Deaf	Norway
Pakistan Association of the Deaf	Pakistan
Asociación Nacional de Sordos de Panamá	Panama
Centro de Sordos del Paraguay	Paraguay
Asociacion de Sordos del Perú	Peru
Philippine Federation of the Deaf, Inc	Philippines
Polski Związek Głuchych; Polish Association of the Deaf	Poland
Federacão Portuguesa das Associacões de Surdos	Portugal
The Qatari Center of Social Cultural for the Deaf	Qatar
Asociația Națională a Surzilor din România National Association of the Deaf in Romania	Romania
All-Russian Society of the Deaf	Russia
Rwanda National Union of the Deaf	Rwanda
Association Nationale des Sourds du Senegal	Senegal
Savez Gluvih I Nagluvih Srbije I Crne Gore	Serbia
Sierra Leone Association of the Deaf	Sierra Leone
Singapore Association for the Deaf	Singapore
Asociácia Nepočujúcich Slovenska	Slovakia
Zvesa društev gluhih in naglušnih Slovenije	Slovenia
Somali National Association of the Deaf	Somalia
Deaf Federation of South Africa	South Africa
Korean Association of the Deaf	South Korea
Confederación Estatal de Personas Sordas	Spain
Sri Lanka Central Federation of the Deaf	Sri Lanka
Sudanese National Society for the Deaf	Sudan
Swedish National Association of the Deaf	Sweden
Schweizerischer Gehörlosenbund, Fédération Suisse des Sourds	Switzerland
Syrian Federation of Societies for the Welfare of the Deaf	Syria
Tajik Society of the Deaf	Tajikistan
Tanzania Association of the Deaf	Tanzania
National Association of the Deaf in Thailand	Thailand
Association des Sourds du Togo	Togo
Association Voix du Sourd de Tunisie	Tunisia
Turkish National Federation of the Deaf	Turkey
Uganda National Association of the Deaf	Uganda
Ukrainian Society of the Deaf (USD)	Ukraine
British Deaf Association (BDA)	United Kingdom
National Association of the Deaf	United States
Asociación de Sordos del Uruguay	Uruguay
Uzbek Society of the Deaf	Uzbekistan
Federación Venezolana de Sordos	Venezuela
Zambia National Association of the Deaf	Zambia
Zimbabwe National Association of the Deaf	Zimbabwe

== World Congress ==
The World Congress of the World Federation of the Deaf has been held every four years since 1951. Organised by the WFD and the host country, this event is attended by thousands of deaf people from all over the world. As well as convening the general assembly (the highest decision-making body of the WFD) and forming the guidelines for the next four years of its work, the congress holds a large cultural program including theatre performances, cinema, exhibitions, performing arts, visits to local places of interest.

Number	Year	Month/Dates	Location	Theme
1 (I)	1951	23 September	Rome, Italy	(no theme)
2 (II)	1955	23–27 August	Zagreb, Yugoslavia	(no theme)
3 (III)	1959	22–26 August	Wiesbaden, Federal Republic of Germany	(no theme)
4 (IV)	1963	17–21 August	Stockholm, Sweden	(no theme)
5 (V)	1967	10–17 August	Warsaw, Poland	The Deaf Among Hearing Persons
6 (VI)	1971	31 July–5 August	Paris, France	The Deaf Person in the World in Evolution
7 (VII)	1975	31 July–8 August	Washington, D.C., United States of America	Full Citizenship for All Deaf People
8 (VIII)	1979	20–27 July	Varna, Bulgaria	The Deaf People in Modern Society
9 (IX)	1983	28 June–6 July	Palermo, Italy	Deafness Today & Tomorrow: Reality & Utopia
10 (X)	1987	20–28 July	Espoo (Helsinki), Finland	One World - One Responsibility
11 (XI)	1991	5–? July	Tokyo, Japan	Equality and Self-Reliance
12 (XII)	1995	6–15 July	Vienna, Austria	Towards Human Rights
13 (XIII)	1999	25–31 July	Brisbane, Australia	Diversity and Unity
14 (XIV)	2003	18–26 July	Montréal, Canada	Opportunities and Challenges in the 21st Century
15 (XV)	2007	16–22 July	Madrid, Spain	Human Rights through Sign Languages
16 (XVI)	2011	18–24 July	Durban, South Africa	Global Deaf Renaissance
17 (XVII)	2015	28 July–1 August	Istanbul, Turkey	Strengthening Human Diversity
18 (XVIII)	2019	23–27 July	Paris, France	Sign Language Rights for All
19 (XIX)	2023	11–15 July	Jeju, South Korea	Securing Human Rights in Times of Crises
20 (XX)	2027	19-23 September	Abu Dhabi, United Arab Emirates	Sign Languages: Always and Everywhere

During the 14th Congress the World Association of Sign Language Interpreters (WASLI) was established.

== Presidents ==
- 1951–1955: Vittorio Ieralla Italia
- 1955–1983: Dragoljub Vukotić Yugoslavia
- 1983–1995: Yerker Andersson US
- 1995–2003: Liisa Kauppinen Finland
- 2003–2011: Markku Jokinen Finland
- 2011–2019: Colin Allen Australia
- 2019–: Joseph Murray US

== See also ==
- International Day of Sign Languages
- International Sign
- List of sign languages
- European Union of the Deaf
- National Association of the Deaf (United States)
- National Association of the Deaf (Italy)
- World Association of Sign Language Interpreters
