= History of institutions for deaf education =

The establishment of schools and institutions specializing in deaf education has a history spanning back across multiple centuries. They utilized a variety of instructional approaches and philosophies. The manner in which the language barrier is handled between the hearing and the deaf remains a topic of great controversy. Many of the early establishments of formalized education for the deaf are currently acknowledged for their influence on the development and standards of deaf education today.

== France: 1760 – National Institute for Deaf-Mutes ==
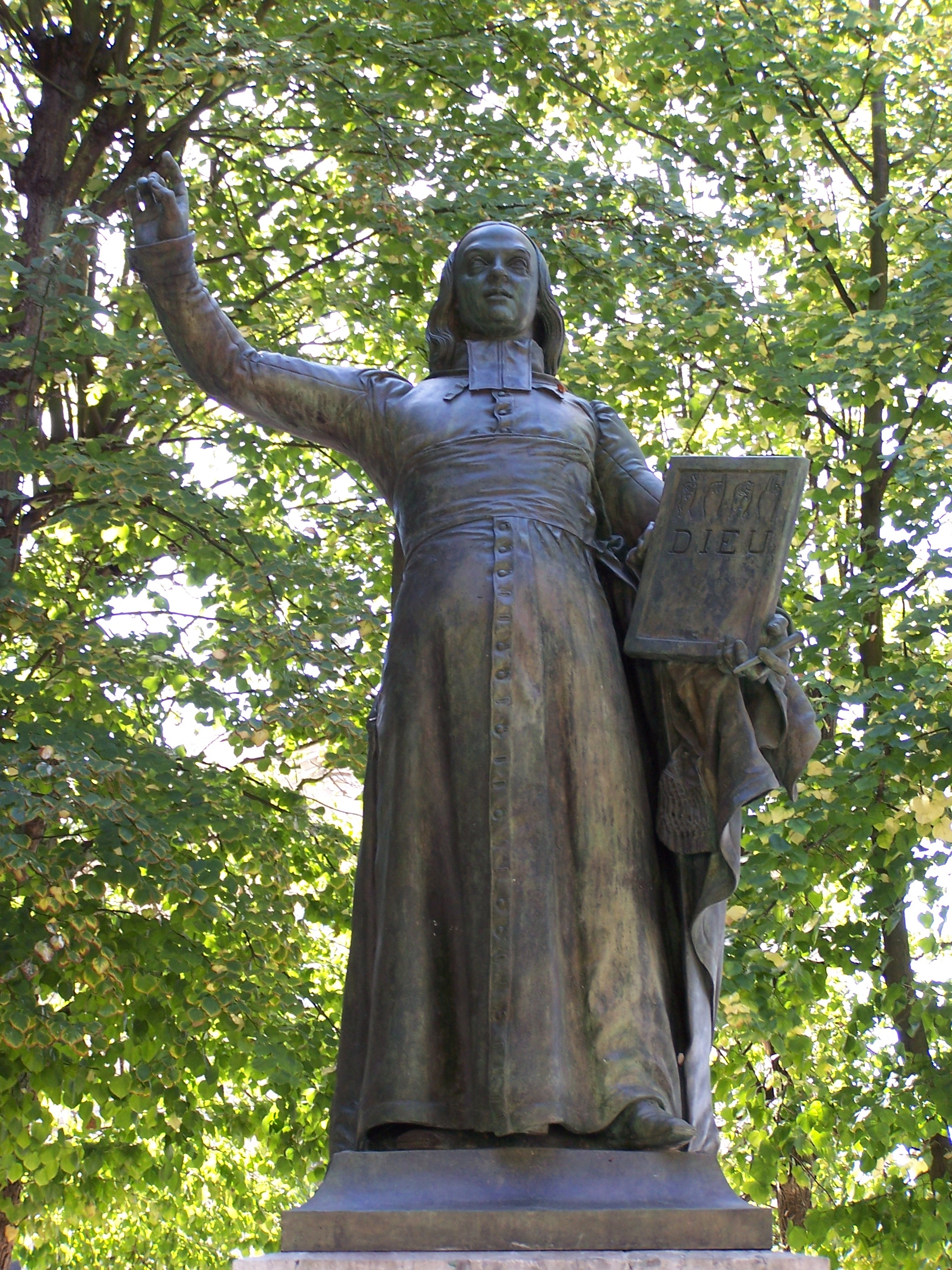
Abbé Charles-Michel de l'Épée.

=== Charles-Michel de l'Épée ===
Charles-Michel de l'Épée (1712-1789), also known as the Abbé de l'Épée, was a philanthropic Catholic priest known for founding the first free public school for the deaf. He is commonly referred to by the monikers "Father of the Deaf" and "Father of Sign Language". The historical reality is that he learned the already existing sign language from his early deaf pupils and converted it into a form he found preferable for use in educational methods.

=== Development and expansion ===
The National Institute of Deaf-mutes was founded in 1760 by Charles-Michel de l'Épée in Paris, France. Its establishment of origin was a house on 14 rue des Moulin. Two years later, it was opened to the public. Its second installation was established on the rue de Saint-Jacques adjacent to Luxembourg Palace and its gardens.

=== Instructional methodology ===
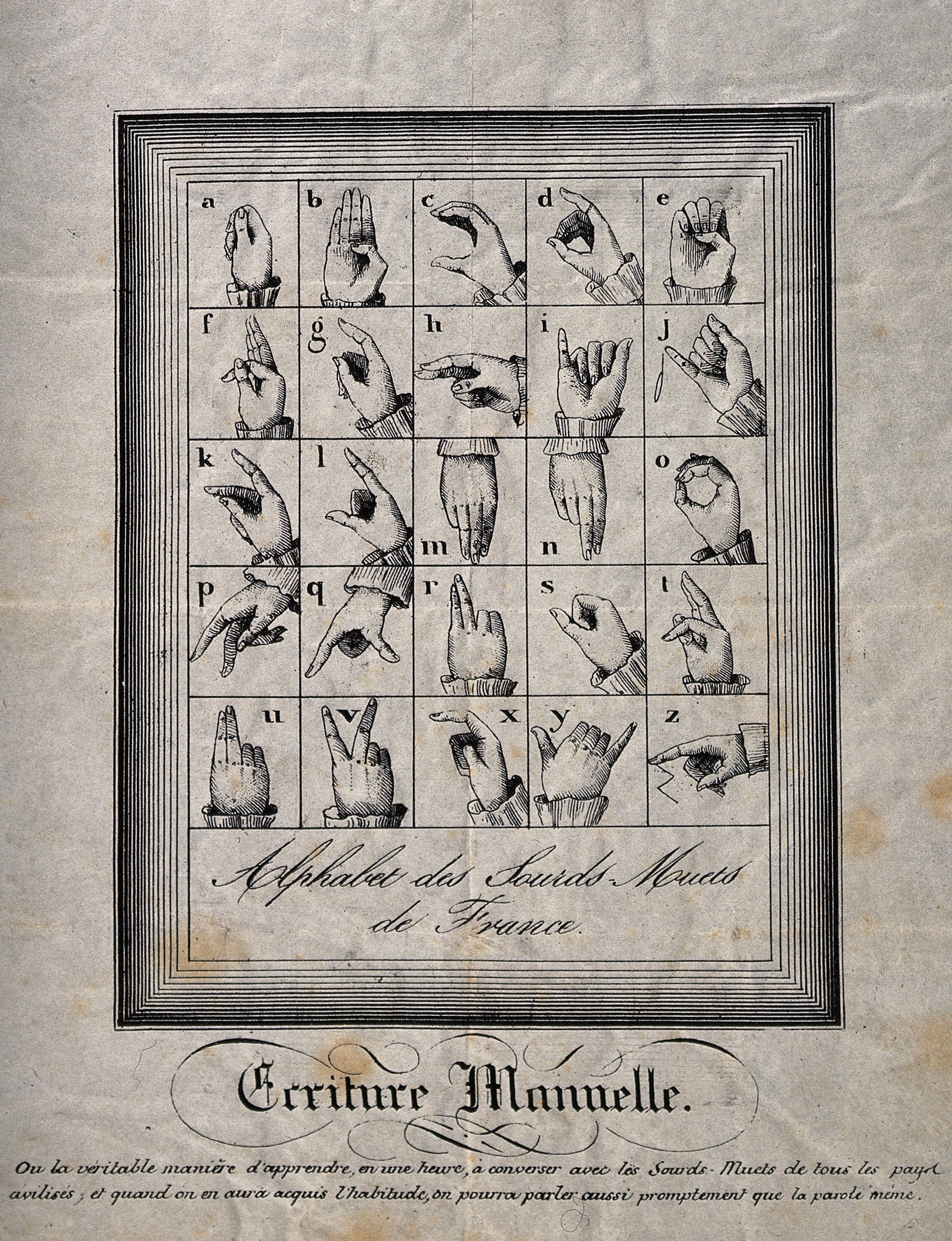
Hand-shapes of the French Sign Language alphabet.

As a Catholic institution, the school curriculum applied emphasis to religious studies. Students were also educated in various vocational trades popular during the era. The school's primary focus was on the acquisition of language. The approach made popular by Épée was dubbed signes méthodiques or Methodical Sign. This consisted of translating French Sign Language and converting it to Épée's French Manual alphabet. This was composed of individual hand shapes and signs used to represent specific counterparts of the written and spoken French language in a direct word for word translation. This form of methodical sign is also referred to as manual sign, or in this case Signed French. This differs explicitly from French Sign Language, which is a separate language in its own right. Such methods of manual language translation remain popular today, especially in hearing-based educational settings.

=== Influences and survival of institution ===
On July 29, 1791, the school was renamed the Institut National de Jeunes Sourds de Paris, which it remains and is active to this day. However, today, the institution uses French Sign Language in its educational practices, as opposed to Manual French. Approximately twenty-one additional schools were later opened in European and other countries, using educational methods inspired by Épée's original vision.

==== Notable students ====
- Roch-Ambroise Cucurron Sicard
- Jean Massieu
- Laurent Clerc
- Thomas Hopkins Gallaudet

== England: 1760 – Braidwood Academy for the Deaf and Dumb ==
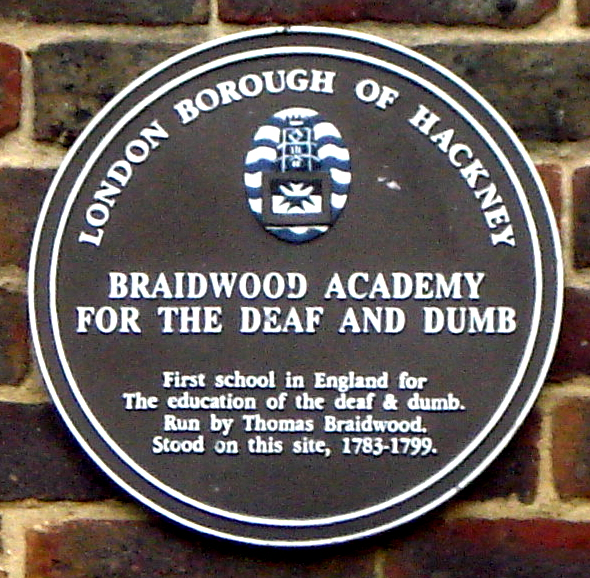
Plaque outside of former location of Braidwood Academy.

=== Thomas Braidwood ===
In 1760, Scottish teacher Thomas Braidwood founded Braidwood Academy for the Deaf and Dumb in Edinburgh. The school's rapid gain of public attention could be credited to Thomas Braidwood's brazen advertising of his methods and his institution.

=== Development and expansion ===
The school began with only one student, a young deaf man named Charles Shirreff. It continued gaining notoriety over time, increasing its student population and staff. In 1783, the school was relocated to a larger facility outside of London.

=== Instructional methodology ===
The educational approach utilized a "combined system" incorporating sign language, articulation, speech, and lip reading. Braidwood's input into the development and application of a signed language has been credited as one of the most significant influencers of what would become British Sign Language. BSL was recognized as an official language in 2003. The success of his students helped create much publicity for the school and Braidwood's methods. His use of oral methods to teach his students articulation and speech were considered impressive to the public.

Many of his students, such as painter Charles Shireff, went on to pursue successful careers in various fields. Other notable students included John Goodricke; an astronomer, Francis Mackenzie; a governor of Barbados, John Philip Wood; an author, genealogist, editor, and Over-Deputy of the Scottish Excise Office, and Jane Poole, who set a precedent for having her Last Will and Testament approved by a jury as valid and legally binding despite her execution of the will being dictated entirely by fingerspelling. However, many did not retain any significant or long term capacity of their oral education. Conversely, many chose career paths that would not require them to use any significant manner of oral communication.

=== Influences and survival of institution ===
In 1784, Braidwood's nephew, Joseph Watson began studying as a teacher of deaf education under Braidwood. In 1792, John Townsend, along with Henry Cox Mason, Henry Thornton, and more, founded the Asylum for the Deaf and Dumb also known as the "London Asylum for the Education of Deaf and Dumb Children of the Poor" with Joseph Watson as the new institution's headmaster. This school was hailed as the first public school for deaf education in Britain. Braidwood Academy for the Deaf and Dumb, now known as Braidwood School, and the Asylum for the Deaf and Dumb – which was later renamed the Royal School for Deaf Children – are still in operation to date. Braidwood School still employs the method of a "combined system" of education that was made popular by its founder.

== Germany: 1778 – Samuel Heinicke's School for Deaf Children in Leipzig ==
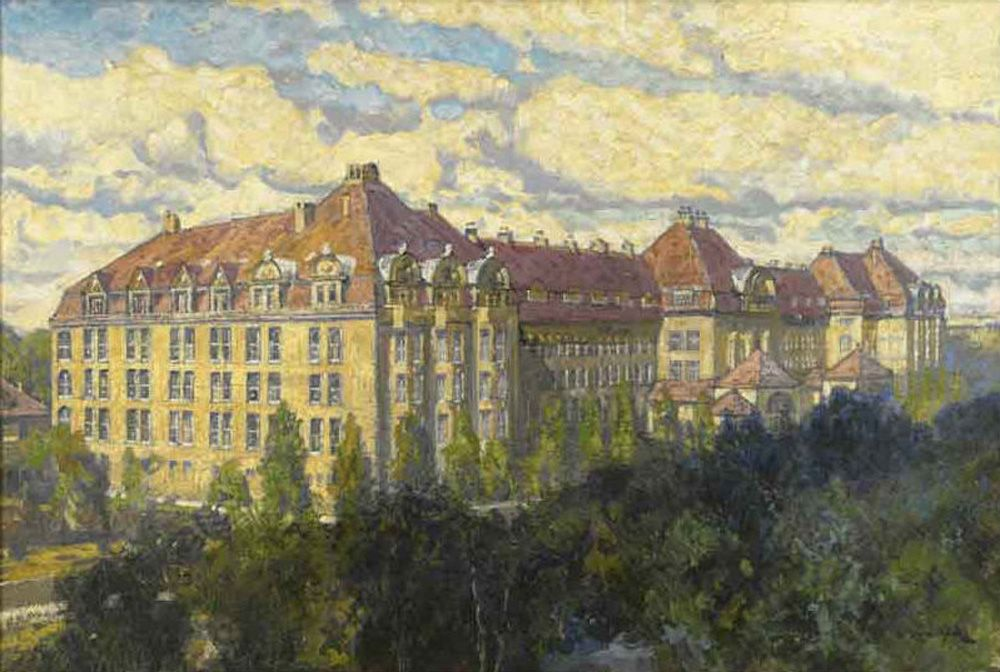
Samuel Heinicke's Leipzig School in 1915.

=== Samuel Heinicke ===
In 1778, Samuel Heinicke opened the first German public school for the education of the deaf, originally called the "Electoral Saxon Institute for Mutes and Other Persons Afflicted with Speech Defects."

=== Development and expansion ===
Like Épée's school in France, Heinicke's institution was opened publicly to serve underprivileged deaf youth. However, unlike Épée, Heinicke resolutely opposed the dependence on sign language and, in 1780, published a book attacking the Abbé de l'Épée's use of sign language in the education of deaf students. He ardently advocated the oral method of deaf education made popular throughout Europe by other prominent contributors to the field, such as Johann Konrad Amman. Amman theorized that "The breath of life resides in the voice, transmitting enlightenment through it. The voice is the interpreter of our hearts and expresses their affections and desires." Like Amman, Heinicke believed a spoken language to be an indispensable aspect of a proper education.

=== Instructional methodology ===
Heinicke's institution in Leipzig capitalized on teaching deaf children to lipread and produce speech. Slight augmentations of oralist techniques cultivated by Heinicke were self-proclaimed as his own "German system". Certain well-guarded aspects of this system utilized techniques that would remain unshared with the greater educational community until after his death. His last will and testament revealed one of his techniques to be a method of using the gustatory and olfactory senses to stimulate mental associations for speech development in deaf pupils. To this approach, Heinicke asserted that "Sight and touch were not enough to learn the vowels; a third sense must be brought into play." Sugar water, olive oil, vinegar, absinthe, and pure water were among flavors frequently paired with specific vowel sounds in attempts to create more lasting associations in his students.

Although Heinicke alleged that his methods were of his own creation, an earlier treatise by a deaf linguist in France had been published prior to Heinicke's claims. In his autobiographical letter, Saboureux de Fontenay previously asserted that "Easily discriminable tastes can represent the sounds of letters and we can put them in the mouth as a means of getting ideas into the mind."

=== Influences and survival of institution ===
Many other teachers across Germany were sent by their local governments to acquire training under Heinicke at his Leipzig establishment. A young priest named Hemeling was sent by the duke of Baden, Charles Frederick, to learn from Heinicke. Frederick then opened a school for the deaf in Karlsruhe, Germany. Three sons-in-law of Heinicke also played integral roles in the survival and expansion of the school in Leipzig. His first son-in-law, Ernst Adolf Eschke, established a complementary site in Berlin, before assuming directorship of Leipzig after Heinicke's death. However, Eschke turned away from the oralist methods of his father-in-law in preference of Épée's and Sicard's manual sign language philosophies. The legacy in deaf education was further carried on by two more of Heinicke's son-in-laws, August Friedrich Petschke and Carl Gottlob Reich, respectively. Reich's own son-in-law, serves today as the school's current director.

The school is still operational to date under the official name Saxon State School for the Hearing Impaired Samuel Heinicke Support Center, commonly referred to as simply Samuel Heinicke School. Today the institution utilizes a blended approach to the education of its students, but continues to apply emphasis to audio-verbal educational therapies and techniques.

== United States: 1857 – Gallaudet University ==
=== Founding and collaboration ===
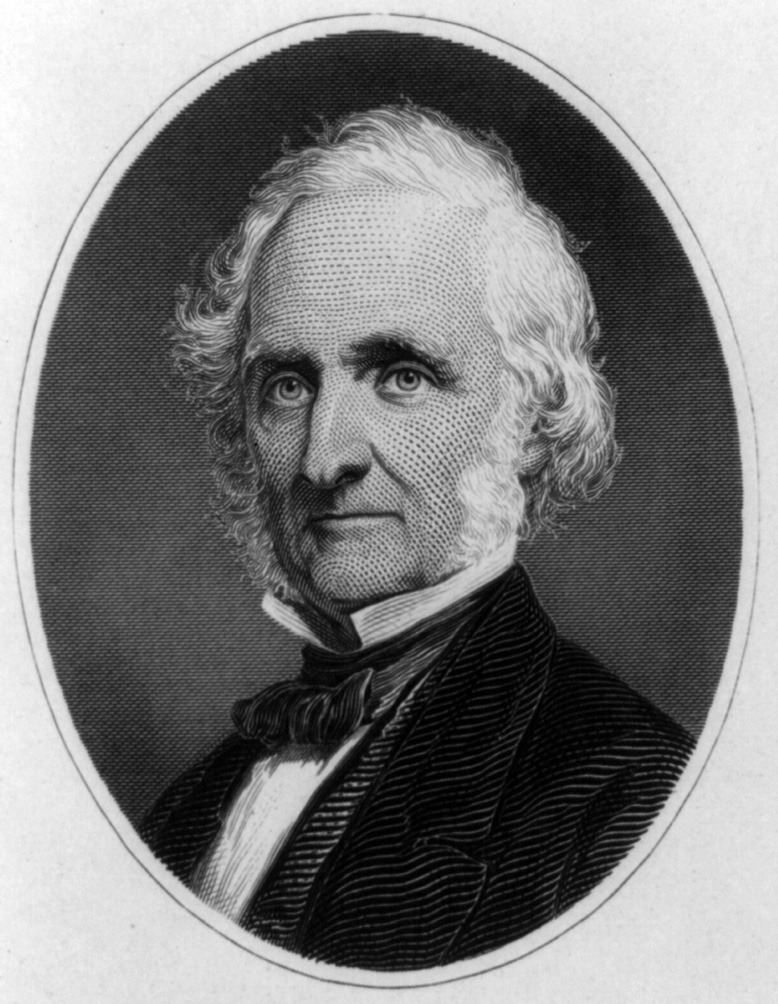
Amos Kendall.

Gallaudet University was originally established as a grammar school for deaf and blind children under the name Columbia Institute for the Instruction of the Deaf, Dumb and Blind. The school was founded in 1857 by Amos Kendall (1789-1869) on his estate. It was later renamed in commemoration of progressive educator and advocate Thomas Hopkins Gallaudet.

Amos Kendall hired Edward Miner Gallaudet, son of Thomas Gallaudet, as the school's first superintendent.

=== Development and expansion ===
As a result of intensive lobbying on the school's behalf by Kendall and Gallaudet, on April 8, 1864, President Abraham Lincoln signed a bill that allowed the school to award college degrees to its graduating students. The first commencement ceremony took place in June 1869 with the graduation of three deaf men. The diplomas were signed by President Ulysses S. Grant and, since then, all diplomas from Gallaudet are signed by the sitting United States President. As a result of its new classification, the institution revised its name to the National College for the Deaf and Dumb.

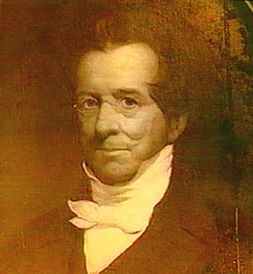
Thomas Hopkins Gallaudet, a co-founder of Deaf education in the United States (along with Laurent Clerc and Mason Cogswell).

==== Additional names and dates ====
- 1865 - The school's blind students were transferred to the Maryland Institution for the Blind, while the remaining institution was renamed the National Deaf-Mute College.
- 1885 - The school's Primary Department was moved into a new building to be known as the Kendall School in honor of namesake Amos Kendall.
- 1894 - The college was renamed to Gallaudet College in honor of Thomas Hopkins Gallaudet.
- 1911 - The corporate name, inclusive of both the college and Primary Department, was renamed Columbia Institution for the Deaf.
- 1954 - The corporate name was also consolidated to Gallaudet College.
- 1966 - Congress authorizes The Model Secondary School for the Deaf to be established, which opened on campus three years later.
- 1970 - President Richard Nixon signed Public Law 91-587 allowing the Kendall School to become the Kendall Demonstration Elementary School.
- 1986 - President Ronald Reagan signed the Education of the Deaf Act and Gallaudet College was renamed Gallaudet University.

=== Instructional methodology ===
Gallaudet is known for its stalwart background in promoting the use of sign language as its primary modality of education and language acquisition. Among the primary influencers of this ideology was 18th-century physician Dr. Mason Fitch Cogswell. It was he who employed Thomas Hopkins Gallaudet, his neighbor at the time, to pursue knowledge of deaf education in Europe. Gallaudet initially traveled to England, wherein he attempted to gain insight on oral methods from an unwilling Thomas Braidwood. He then traveled to France where he became acquainted with a system derived from French Sign Language made popular by abbés Épée and Sicard. He later returned to the United States, accompanied by deaf educator Laurent Clerc.

Thomas Hopkins Gallaudet and the school that would become his namesake abandoned the original pursuit to bring oralism back to America. As a result, the sign language used by the French Deaf community, as well as the system of manual French, were introduced into the United States. Over time, these evolved into what is now officially recognized as its own language: American Sign Language (ASL).

The preference for a sign language based modality had been adapted by the school's founders and began to root in Deaf communities across the country. However, oral methods would eventually make their way to the U.S. as well. In similar controversy, Edward Miner Gallaudet would later assert that oral instruction is usually of little value to the congenitally deaf.

=== Influences and Survival of Institution ===
Today, Gallaudet University is known with prestige for being the first institute of higher learning for deaf education. It is considered by both deaf and hearing people to be among the primary resources for all things related to deaf people, including education, ASL, Deaf culture, and other topics of relevance.

== Germany: 1873 – Israelite Institute for the Deaf of Germany ==
The Israelite Institute for the Deaf of Germany was founded by a hearing man named Markus Reich. The school was opened to the public in 1873; however, its conception began around 1870-71 when Reich was taking his final teaching exams. At this time, he had noted the exclusionary treatment of the Jewish and Deaf communities, especially as it pertained to eligibility for education.

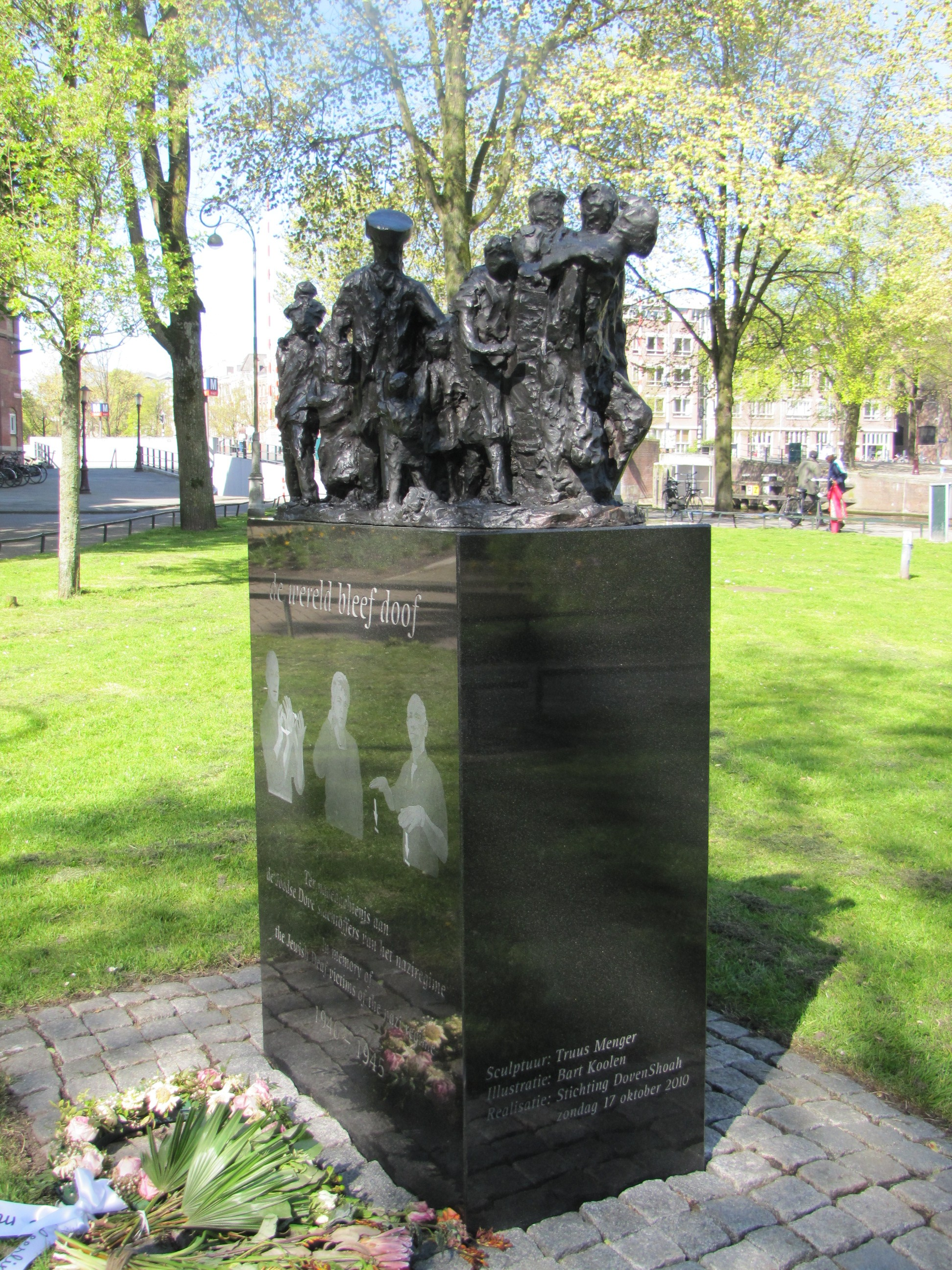
Monument of remembrance honoring the persecution of the Jewish Deaf during the Holocaust.

=== Development and expansion ===
The institution was originally located in a "small house in Fürstenwalde an der Spree". Reich was poor when he opened the institution and struggled to afford the school's expenses. He established a Jewish support organization for the deaf composed of wealthy community benefactors to help fund the continued efforts of the school. The support of this organization known as "Jedide Ilmim" or "Friends of the Deaf" made possible, not only the continued security of Reich's institute, but also the opportunity for its expansion. In 1890, the institution was relocated to a larger facility in Weissensee near Berlin.

=== Instructional methodology ===
The school had a high level of educational training for its staff. This was supported by the results seen from final exams of the school's former students. In memorandum, Reich was noted for having embraced the use and practice of sign language both in his teaching modality and in his personal life. The school was considered to have offered curricula and upholding of educational standards in a manner that was competitively on par with other institutions of its time. Reich's successor and son, Felix Reich, suggested in 1930 that the school's primary difference, in terms of teaching philosophy, was that the use of sign language was not discouraged. In likeness to his father's ideals, Felix asserted that "the development of the mind and spirit, and not simply the acquisition of language, was considered the greatest goal." In addition to general education, the institute also offered additional classes for gifted students or those with special needs of remedial instruction.

=== Influences and survival of the institution ===
After Markus Reich's death, Felix Reich carried on his father's legacy from 1919 until the school's demise. The oppressive forces of Adolf Hitler's Nazi ideology made continuing the school's normal functions impossible. Nothing remains of this institution, save a well known plaque commemorating its existence. The plaque reads: "From this house 146 Jewish Deaf citizens were dragged by fascist bandits and murdered in 1942. Memorial to the dead. Reminder for the living."

== Oralism in education ==
The Merriam-Webster dictionary defines oralism as: "advocacy or use of the oral method of teaching the deaf". Oralism consists of various methods used in teaching the deaf how to read lips by recognizing formations of the mouth in spoken dialogue, practicing certain breathing patterns used to produce words and letters, and mimicking mouth shapes. Such methods can be traced as far back as 1648. Oralism gained popularity in America in the 1860s when it began being utilized in the education process of many schools for the deaf. The notion of oral methodology gained tread in deaf educational institutions as popular opinion believed it was paramount for the deaf community try to "assimilate" themselves into the hearing world.

== See also ==
- Deaf education
- Deaf history
- Deaf culture
- Manualism
- Manualism vs Oralism
- Old French Sign Language
- Fingerspelling
- History of deaf education in the United States
