= UIN =

UIN may refer to:

== Common ==
- User Identification Number, used by many computer security systems and ICQ, see ICQ#UIN, Unique identifier and User (computing)
- Universal Identification Number
  - used for people, see National identification number and Unique Identification Authority of India, see also Permanent account number (PAN)
  - used for inventory, see also UID
- University Identification Number, used by many universities for students, faculty and alumni
- Unit Identification Number, used by the military, see Military unit
- Unit Identification Number, used by the Department of Education, see Integrated Postsecondary Education Data System
- Unique Identification Number, similar to Universal Identification Number used for people and inventory, see above, and often replaced by Universally unique identifier (UUID)

== Other uses ==
- User Intelligent Network, a type of network artificial intelligence, see, for example Personal communications network
- Airport code for Quincy Regional Airport in Illinois, United States
