= Taxpayer Identification Number =

Identifier for a taxpaying entity in the United States

A Taxpayer Identification Number (TIN) is an identifying number used for tax purposes in the United States and in other countries under the Common Reporting Standard. In the United States it is also known as a Tax Identification Number (TIN) or Federal Taxpayer Identification Number (FTIN). A TIN may be assigned by the Social Security Administration (SSA) or by the Internal Revenue Service (IRS).

== Types ==
Any government-provided number that can be used in the US as a unique identifier when interacting with the IRS is a TIN, though none of them are referred to exclusively as a Taxpayer Identification Number. A TIN may be:

- a Social Security number (SSN)
- an Individual Taxpayer Identification Number (ITIN)
- an Employer Identification Number (EIN), also known as a FEIN (Federal Employer Identification Number)
- an Adoption Taxpayer Identification Number (ATIN), used as a temporary number for a child for whom the adopting parents cannot obtain an SSN
- a Preparer Tax Identification Number (PTIN), used by paid preparers of US tax returns

=== SSNs ===
SSNs are used by people who have or had the right to work in the United States.

=== ITINs ===
ITINs are used by aliens who may or may not have the right to work in the US, such as aliens on temporary visas and non-resident aliens with US income.

=== EINs ===
EINs are used by employers, sole proprietors, corporations, LLCs, partnerships, non-profit associations, trusts, estates of decedents, government agencies, certain individuals, and other business entities.

== Relevant Internal Revenue Code sections ==
Section 6109(a) of the Internal Revenue Code provides (in part) that "When required by regulations prescribed by the Secretary [of the Treasury or his delegate] [ . . . ] Any person required under the authority of this title [i.e., under the Internal Revenue Code] to make a return, statement, or other document shall include in such return, statement or other document such identifying number as may be prescribed for securing proper identification of such person."

Internal Revenue Code section 6109(d) provides: "The social security account number issued to an individual for purposes of section 205(c)(2)(A) of the Social Security Act [codified as 42 U.S.C. § 405(c)(2)(A)] shall, except as shall otherwise be specified under regulations of the Secretary [of the Treasury or his delegate], be used as the identifying number for such individual for purposes of this title [the Internal Revenue Code, title 26 of the United States Code]."

== See also ==
=== US taxation ===
- Taxation in the United States

=== Number use ===
- Personal identification number (PIN)
- Primary key
- Serial number
- Single version of the truth
- Surrogate key
- Transaction authentication number
- Unique identifier (UID)
- UID (disambiguation) § Identifying numbers
- VAT identification number
