= Charles Gorham =

Charles Gorham may refer to:

- Charles T. Gorham (1812–1901), American banker and diplomat
- Charles Gorham (1861–1922), British deaf missioner, newspaper editor and founding member of the British Deaf and Dumb Association
