= Manuel Guzmán Maturana =

Chilean politician

Manuel Guzmán

Member of the Chamber of Deputies of Chile
- In office 15 May 1926 – 15 May 1930
- Constituency: 7th Departmental District

Personal details
- Born: 29 May 1876 Santiago, Chile
- Died: 5 December 1941 (aged 65)
- Party: Radical Party
- Spouse: Isaura Dinator Rossel
- Children: 2
- Education: University of Chile

Manuel Guzmán Maturana (29 May 1876 – 5 December 1941) was a Chilean professor, writer, and politician who served in the Chamber of Deputies of Chile from 1926 to 1930, as a member of the Radical Party.

== Early life and education ==
Manuel Guzmán Maturana was born in Santiago, Chile, on 29 May 1876, to Pantaleón Guzmán and Mercedes Maturana. He attended the Instituto Nacional and at the Instituto Pedagógico of the University of Chile and graduated as a professor of Spanish in 1900.

== Career ==
Guzmán started writing poetry as a student under the pseudonym Edmundo Dantés. He published Versos, a 188 page poetry collection, in 1901, and the Libro de lectura o lector chileno (Chilean Reader Book) in 1905.

Guzmán was a teacher at the Liceo Barros Borgoño, Liceo Miguel Luis Amunátegui, and University of Chile. He became a teacher at the Institute for the Deaf and Mute in 1899. He was a inspector general, vice-rector, and rector at the Liceo de Aplicación from 1905 to 1925. He served as president of the National Society of Teachers from 1929 to 1932.

In the 1925 election Guzmán was elected to represent the 7th Departmental District as a member of the Radical Party of Chile. During his tenure he was a member of the Public Education and Internal Police committees.

== Personal life ==
Guzmán married Isaura Dinator Rossel, with whom he had two children. He was a freemason. He died on 5 December 1941.

== Works cited ==
- "Manuel Guzmán Maturana". Library of the National Congress of Chile. Archived from the original on 17 October 2026.
