= German Federation of the Deaf =

German national association for the deaf

The German Association of the Deaf (DGB), German: Deutscher Gehörlosen-Bund, is a national association for the deaf in Germany.

The DGB was created shortly after World War I and was inspired by the deaf movements happening in British countries. The symbol of the DGB is a narwhal. The DGB is affiliated to the World Federation of the Deaf (WFD) and the European Union of the Deaf. It was established in 1950 as a successor to the Reich Union of the Deaf of Germany. Its headquarters are in Berlin. The president is Ralph Raule.

== Presidents of DGB and preceding organizations ==
- 1913–1915 Karl Pawlek
- 1915–1917 Josef Pollanetz
- 1917–1919 Franz Wilhelm
- 1919–1921 Theodor Kratochwil
- 1921–1923 Georg Schwarzböck
- 1923–1926 Karl Pawlek
- 1926–1928 Theodor Kratochwil
- 1928–1938 Georg Schwarzböck
- 1940–1943 Karl Johann Brunner
- 1946–1949 Heinrich Prochazka
- 1949–1955 Karl Altenaichinger
- 1956–1960 Heinrich Prochazka
- 1960–1965 Karl Johann Brunner
- 1965–1970 Gerhard Schmidt
- 1970–1985 Willibald Tapler
- 1985–1997 Peter Dimmel
- 1997–2001 Trude Dimmel
- 2001– Helene Jarmer

== See also ==
- Sign language
- German Sign Language
- Deaf culture
- Deaf rights movement
