= Deaf organizations during the Holocaust =

German organizations for deaf people under the Nazis

In Germany, a number of social welfare organisations for deaf people existed at the accession to power of the Nazi Party in 1933. Some of these collaborated with the Nazi regime.

== ReGeDe ==
Before 1927, there were hundreds of deaf clubs around Germany. Each club had its own agenda and differed by city and deaf community. In 1927, during Weimar Germany, a transformation began and changed the deaf community in Germany.

=== Beginning ===
The Reichsgewerkschaft der Gehörlosen Deutschlands, abbreviated and stylized as ReGeDe, was known in English as The Reich Union of the Deaf of Germany, and was founded in 1927 in Weimar, Germany as a social organization. By the Easter of 1933, ReGeDe was part of the National Socialists' public welfare program. Less than a year later, ReGeDe claimed to have more than 3,900 members, including deaf activist Karl Wacker, who fought on behalf of the deaf community against the sterilization law. The ReGeDe union included such groups as deaf advocacy and support agencies, self-help organizations, sports clubs, and much more. "The division of deaf associations into church-affiliated groups, and athletic union, and others" was too much to Heinrich Siepmann, an activist in the deaf community. He saw "just one association for the German deaf…a union" The union he envisioned was the ReGeDe. Following Siepmann's example, further efforts were made to incorporate the remaining independent organizations into ReGeDe.

ReGeDe had a strong desire to do away with local deaf organizations, and the associations that now formed ReGeDe enticed, threatened, and coerced deaf children to become members, and appeals were made to their parents. Werner Thomas made such a plea to involve deaf children in Hitler Youth, found in the Newsletter of the Berlin Deaf Athletic Association:

Of the Leipzig and Dresden Sports Associations almost one hundred percent of the members are doing their duty with joyful hearts as Hitler Youth. It is then all the more shameful that many Berlin athletes still oppose membership...training in Hitler Youth and the troopers is very worthwhile for the German people as a whole. There out youngsters will be trained in iron discipline, comradeship and self-sacrifice...We, as deaf, will never be called to the labor force, to the army and so on. Service in Hitler Youth offers you the last opportunity to go through a hard school...serving the interests of Adolf Hitler's Reich takes precedence over everything!!!...I urge you for the last time...to report to the troop leader...otherwise, dissociate yourselves with our fine community...Finally I appeal to the respected parents and also to my fellow club members to give their full understanding to the action that I have undertaken in the state's interest

ReGeDe's recruitment methods were successful, as it grew from 3,900 on Easter in 1933, to 11,588 members by January 1, 1937. Fear of the sterilization law most likely amplified these member numbers, as some deaf citizens believed that becoming a member of ReGeDe would allow them to be protected from the sterilization law. However, the leaders never promised protection from the law, it was only assumed by the German deaf.

As the Nazis gained more power, ReGeDe moved to become a more thorough Nazi organization. "Contributing greatly to this powerlessness [of the deaf peoples] was the unification and harmonization policy of the ReGeDe, whose Nazi leadership clique fully endorsed the ideology of Nazi eugenicists and race hygienists." In 1927, shortly after ReGeDe's founding, Fritz Albreghs (1892–1945) became its chairman. ReGeDe was led by the deaf Nazi Fritz Albreghs, the 'Fuhrer of the Deaf'. He used both sign and speech to get across the Nazi message. Albreghs organized ReGeDe by Nazi leadership standards, and supervised it strictly. All local deaf clubs and associations were taken over by district associations, and those, in turn, were under the district inspectorates.

=== The Downfall ===
Siepmann, head of the German deaf athletic club, the Deaf Union for Physical Training also supported consolidation under Nazi leadership. "The organization's head, Fritz Albreghs, had applied for Party membership for everyone in ReGeDe." Albreghs and the administrative head Ballier, both of whom signed the ReGeDe membership card, did not hesitate to denounce their "hereditarily diseased" fellows. Albreghs even wore a brown stormtrooper uniform and swastika-eventually most leaders of ReGeDe did as well. In 1942, Albreghs was removed from the leadership of ReGeDe, and Karl Brunner took leadership. However, the following year leadership was taken by Karl Engelmann, who lead the Deaf Hitler Youth.

The actions of the German Deaf Workers Union founded in 1918, which joined the ReGeDe, were said to "instead of building up [the deaf community] had destroyed everything in a fratricidal war!" Albreghs, Siepmann and Edmund Matz worked together to pursue a policy of unifying all organization for and of deaf Germans with the premise: "where resistance arises, it will gradually be eliminated" and "when necessary, harshly and ruthlessly".

ReGeDe worked with teachers and administrators in encouraging support for the Nazi regime and its racial hygiene program. One regional association in 1937 reported that "collaboration with Nazi public welfare is excellent. Almost the entire body of teachers of the deaf are working effectively in our common sense of destiny." Part of this "destiny" involved sterilization of deaf and other 'hereditarily diseased.' ReGeDe was a "strong proponent of sterilization", even going as far as releasing a statement that: "prevention is better than cure," and that it is patriotic to be sterilized since "the deaf do not need to be soldiers but sterilization is a sacrifice like soldiering." People felt threatened by the sterilization law and joined ReGeDe in hopes of avoiding being sterilized. It was said that "whoever refused was taken away by police." Teachers, principals, nurses, and ReGeDe leaders turned in deaf people, and sometimes even personally took them to the clinics. One deaf person who experienced these events recounted: "despite the fact that I was a party member, I was sterilized after a 12-month long judicial process." Horst Biesold, the author of Crying Hands conducted a survey and found that 5 of the 1,215 forcibly sterilized deaf respondents reported that the ReGeDe had informed on them, with Albreghs and Ballier reporting 2 of those 5.

=== Deaf women in Nazi society, and ReGeDe's role ===
Emilie Klusener-Esch founded the women's division of association of the deaf in 1911, but it was not active. Emilie was involved in the development of introducing deaf women to Nazi ideology. She joined the Nazi women's organization in 1932, and shortly thereafter, Albreghs gave her authority to establish the Reich women's union within the ReGeDe. Emilie was voluntarily sterilized, even though she came from a "hereditarily sound" family. She touted that being sterilized is a sacrifice, and used that sacrifice as a model to convince other deaf women to also be voluntarily sterilized.

== Deaf Union for Physical Training ==
The Deaf Union for Physical Training was an athletic club. It was founded by Heinrich Siepmann, a leader of the Deaf who proposed the consolidation of the separate Reich Union with the athletics division under the Nazi regime. Athletics was seen as a means by which children could be conditioned, not only physically, but socially in favor of representing Adolf Hitler and the Nazi party as a whole. It was felt that children should engage in athletic activity at least once a week. The tactics by which recruitment efforts were made included, among others, enticement, threats, and coercion.

== Friends of the Deaf ==
Friends of the Deaf, also known as Jedide Ilmim, was a Jewish support organization for deaf people founded by Markus Reich and was continued by his son, Felix Reich. The "Friends of the Deaf" was established in an effort to help fund the school Markus Reich had founded, the Israelite Institute for the Deaf of Germany. The efforts made by this group would aid in amassing support from the community for the Deaf cause.

== See also ==
- German Federation of the Deaf
