= Charles Gorham (1861–1922) =

British deaf organiser and athlete

- Gorham's late-Victorian carte de visite
- Born: 19 October 1861; Walkeringham, Nottinghamshire, England
- Died: 26 August 1922 (aged 60); Nottingham, England
- Known for: Development of missions and sporting teams for the deaf community, and for participating in the establishment of the British Deaf Association

Charles Gorham (19 October 1861 – 26 August 1922) was a deaf missioner, newspaper editor, founding member of the British Deaf and Dumb Association (now the British Deaf Association), athlete, engraver, lithographer and photographer.

== Early life and education ==
Gorham was born in Walkeringham, Nottinghamshire, in 1861, the third child of the Reverend George Martyn Gorham and his first cousin Mary Ann, née Holmes. Charles Gorham was born deaf, while his two older siblings, Alfred and Mary, were not. His deafness wasn't confirmed for nearly three years. In August 1864, his father wrote in the parish diary held in the Nottinghamshire Archives: ‘This summer was marked by the terrible discovery of a grievous domestic calamity in his family – the deafness (& consequent dumbness!) of his beloved child Charles, aged nearly 3.’

On 22 August 1864, the Gorhams' fourth child, Edith, was also born deaf. She studied art at the Herkomer School of Art in Bushey, Hertfordshire in 1885, and stayed in Bushey for the rest of her life.

In the 1871 census for Walkeringham, when Gorham was aged 9, both he and Edith were listed as 'scholar' like their older sister, Mary. His 1922 obituary indicates that he was eventually sent away for his education: ‘Mr. Gorham never acquired speech. In his childhood there were not the same facilities for learning it as there are now, and it was not introduced into the excellent private school at West Brompton at which he was educated (under the late Mr. J. Barber), until he was almost too old to begin to learn it satisfactorily.’

Given that he initially made his living as a draftsman and lithographer, either Mr Barber's school offered this instruction or he acquired the technical knowledge in a school elsewhere.

== Services to the deaf community ==
=== Deaf missions and local associations ===
The 1881 census shows Gorham, aged 19, living in Derby St. Werburgh, boarding with Dr. William Roe and family and occupied as a draftsman. He was active in support of Roe's efforts to develop the Derbyshire Deaf and Dumb Association, helping with fundraising efforts.

In early 1882, the Derby Daily Telegraph noted Gorham's participation in one such fundraiser: 'On Wednesday last a musical entertainment, interspersed with addresses, was given in the National Schoolroom in aid of the funds of the Derbyshire Deaf and Dumb Institution. ... Mr. C. Gorham, deaf mute, gave address in the sign language, which was interpreted by Mr. W. R. Roe, the missionary. In the course of his remarks he showed the advantages of education to the deaf mute, and expressed his thankfulness that could meet along with others to join in the worship God in a language they could understand. The deaf and dumb were trying to help, and he trusted the public would render assistance to those who tried help themselves.'

In 1894, William Roe founded the Derbyshire Deaf and Dumb Institution, today the Royal School for the Deaf Derby.

Gorham helped to establish places for the deaf to gather for worship, socialising and entertainment throughout his life, but his connection to the deaf community in Derby remained strongest. Even after moving to Leeds in 1886, and then to Ilkeston, Nottinghamshire in 1892, he continued in his role as the honorary secretary of the Derby and Derbyshire Adult Deaf Mission. The newspapers show evidence of Gorham assisting Roe with outings, entertainment and meetings until 1910 at least, and acting as 'missioner to the deaf and dumb of Derbyshire' into 1915.

In March 1919, The Mansfield Reporter printed: ‘Recently a deputation of deaf-mute residents of North Notts., waited on Mr. C. Gorham, of Nottingham, who has had 38 years experience in connection with deaf-mute education and work, besides founding missions for Derbyshire, Lincolnshire, Leicestershire, Cornwall, and the British Deaf and Dumb Association, with the object of urging him to keep his pre-war promise to look after the interests of North Notts. deaf mutes. Mr. Gorham agreed to commence his duties at once.’

=== Deaf news ===
In 1889, the year of the Report of the Royal Commission on the Blind, the Deaf and Dumb, &c., of the United Kingdom, Gorham co-founded the Deaf and Dumb Times with Joseph Hepworth and acted as its editor. Each monthly issue had eight to 16 pages, and included news, illustrations and correspondence on all topics concerning the deaf community. Gorham wrote in great detail about the Royal commission's report in the September 1889 issue of the magazine. With regards to education, the report recommended as much of a reduction in sign language instruction as possible in favour of pure oral teaching. Gorham was never in favour of the exclusive use of oralism for the deaf, and was a strong advocate for the combined system of manual and oral education.

Gorham retired as editor in the autumn of 1891, by which time he had begun acting as the honorary secretary of the newly founded British Deaf and Dumb Association [see below]. The newspaper was taken over by Hepworth and Henry Lund. Its name was changed to The Deaf Chronicle, and Gorham served as assistant editor. That paper became The British Deaf-Mute, and in 1893 Gorham is listed on the masthead under 'Staff'.

Running the newspaper proved to be financially draining for Gorham, who found himself in bankruptcy court in Leeds in December 1891. The Yorkshire Evening Post reported: 'Charles Gorham, wood engraver, Leeds, with liabilities at £231, and assets at £27, appeared for public examination at the Leeds Bankruptcy Court to-day. Debtor attributed his failure to improvements in photography injuring his occupation as an engraver. In May, 1889, he had commenced a monthly publication called “The Deaf and Dumb Times,” and conducted it for 2 1/2 years. It proved to be a losing venture. The Official Receiver explained that debtor being a deaf-mute, he scarcely knew how to put questions to him. Debtor certainly did appear to be a man of considerable intelligence. The Registrar: But, how are we to get at his intelligence? – The Official Receiver: I propose putting the questions to him in writing. A few questions were so put to the debtor, and after he had answered them, the examination was closed.’

=== The British National Deaf Conference and the British Deaf and Dumb Association ===
Gorham also used his newspaper to help arrange the 'National Conference of Adult Deaf and Dumb Missions and Associations' at St. Saviour's Church, Oxford Street, London, on 16–18 January 1890.

At this conference, Francis Maginn proposed the formation of a national association for the deaf in the United Kingdom, and a special 'Rule Committee' was appointed to draft and approve a constitution for the new association. Gorham was one of six deaf men on the committee, the others being William Agnew, Henry B. Beale, George F. Healey, Francis Maginn and Benjamin H. Payne. There were also six hearing men, all of them missioners to the deaf: Rev. Fanshawe Bingham, Rev. Charles Mansfield Owen, James W. Dawson, J. Dent, C. H. Knight and J. W. Northall. The Rule Committee met twice.

In preparation for the inaugural congress of the new association, Gorham paid his solicitor to help him draw up a draft constitution. At the first meeting, on 25 April 1890, the document was considered and agreed in principle, as was the name: the British Deaf and Dumb Association.

The inaugural congress took place on 24–25 July that year, in Leeds. On the evening of the second day, the chairman delivered an address on the 'History of the Deaf. Scriptural, Historical, Population, Schools, Education of the Deaf from the sixteenth century up to the present time, Statistics, Literature, Legislation, &c.' He was, he stated, indebted to Mr. Gorham for the materials of the paper.'

The congress passed one resolution, from which the association has never departed:

'That this Congress of the British Deaf and Dumb Association, held in Leeds, indignantly protests against the imputation of the Right Hon. Earl Granville, in his recent speech in London, that the finger and sign language was barbarous. We consider such a mode of exchanging our ideas as the most natural and indispensable, and that the Combined System of education is by far preferable to the so-called Pure Oral. We are confident that the Combined System is absolutely necessary for the welfare of the Deaf and Dumb.'

The Rev. William Blomefield Sleight, a hearing missioner to the deaf, was elected the first president of the BDDA, and four deaf regional vice-presidents were elected: William Agnew (Scotland), George F. Healey (England), Francis Maginn (Ireland), Benjamin H. Payne (Wales). Charles Gorham was elected honorary secretary and James Paul as honorary treasurer. The executive committee had eight further members.

In August 1890, Gorham registered in the pages of The Deaf and Dumb Times his personal dissent in the issue of the use of the word ‘dumb’ in the title of the association. ‘The Congress, in deciding that the title should be “The British Deaf and Dumb Association”, would have done better had they omitted the objectionable word ‘dumb’, which is really unnecessary and has proved very misleading to the public.’ The name was changed to the British Deaf Association in 1971.

Gorham remained honorary secretary until 1896.

=== Deaf sports ===
The British Deaf History Society credits Gorham with introducing cricket to the deaf world, and he was also instrumental in the development of deaf football. In the early 1880s, he helped to found the Derby and Nottingham Deaf and Dumb Cricket and Football Club, both organising and playing in matches.

Matches were also organised with hearing clubs. In January 1883 he played with Derby and Nottingham Deaf and Dumb in a football match against the Sheffield Clifford Rovers and Gorham's team won 4–3.

In September 1884, he performed a hat trick for Derby Deaf and Dumb Cricket Club in the first innings of a match against Leeds Deaf and Dumb Cricket Club, and nearly achieved the same in the second innings.

In the spring of 1886, a conference of deaf and dumb football and cricket clubs convened in Derby, the result of which was the formation of the Deaf and Dumb Cricket and Football Association. Gorham was elected honorary secretary.

In July 1889, after a cricket match between the eleven of Kirkburton (near Huddersfield) and twenty-two 'deaf mutes of the district', The Athletic News called Gorham 'by far and away the best all-round man on the field.'

Gorham also helped to organise the first England deaf men's football team, in November 1890 appealing in The Deaf and Dumb Times for headmasters and teachers to forward recommendations of old pupils with playing prowess to him. The team's first game was played before a crowd of 2,000 against Scotland in Glasgow on 28 March 1891. Gorham was captain, and scored the first goal. The game ended in a 3–3 draw. The fixture was repeated on 2 April the following year, in Manchester. Gorham was again captain, and this time England won 7–2.

== Sporting success ==
Gorham had success with hearing sports teams as well as with deaf teams, and was at one point described this way: 'Mr. Gorham is indeed a remarkable man, considering his infirmity, for besides being a good cricketer and footballer, he is an excellent cyclist and billiard player, and at shooting, card, and chess playing can hold his own with the majority.'

As a footballer, he was legacy number 6 with the Derby County Football Club, and made seven appearances in its first season, 1884–1885, playing mostly at half back and sometimes at full back. Following his move to Leeds, Gorham began playing for Leeds Association. By 1888 he was successfully managing the club as well as playing. He played with them into 1890, scoring often: 'To score from half-back nine goals in the last six matches is a rare occurrence. Such was the feat performed by C. Gorham, of the Leeds Association Club, and an ex-Derby County footballer. This will probably be the last season Gorham will be seen regularly on the football field. As a cricketer, however, he is better known, and has a knack of getting runs when all the others fail, as witness his fine innings of 30 last summer for the Yorkshire Gentlemen against Cheshire, when his own side only scored 47 in the second.'

As a talented cricketer, he played for Spondon, Derby Midland, Yorkshire Gentlemen's and Notts. Castle. He was called upon to play into the later 1890s, as attested in the Derby Daily Telegraph of 14 July 1896: 'Played in Nottingham on Saturday, an exciting match resulted in a win for Mr. Holmes's side by one run, for whom Bradley took seven wickets for 23 runs. Gorham, the well-known deaf and dumb cricketer, although he had not played more than two matches for the last four years, who was pressed into service at the last moment by Mr. Moseley being one man short, almost won the match for his side.'

== Later life and death ==
Charles Gorham's headstone in Nottingham General Cemetery

In the 1921 census, Gorham, aged 59, was listed as working as caretaker at the printers A. A. Court & Son in Nottingham, living alone on the premises.

He died of pleurisy in Nottingham on 26 August 1922.
