= Joseph Watson (teacher) =

English teacher of deaf children and writer on teaching the deaf

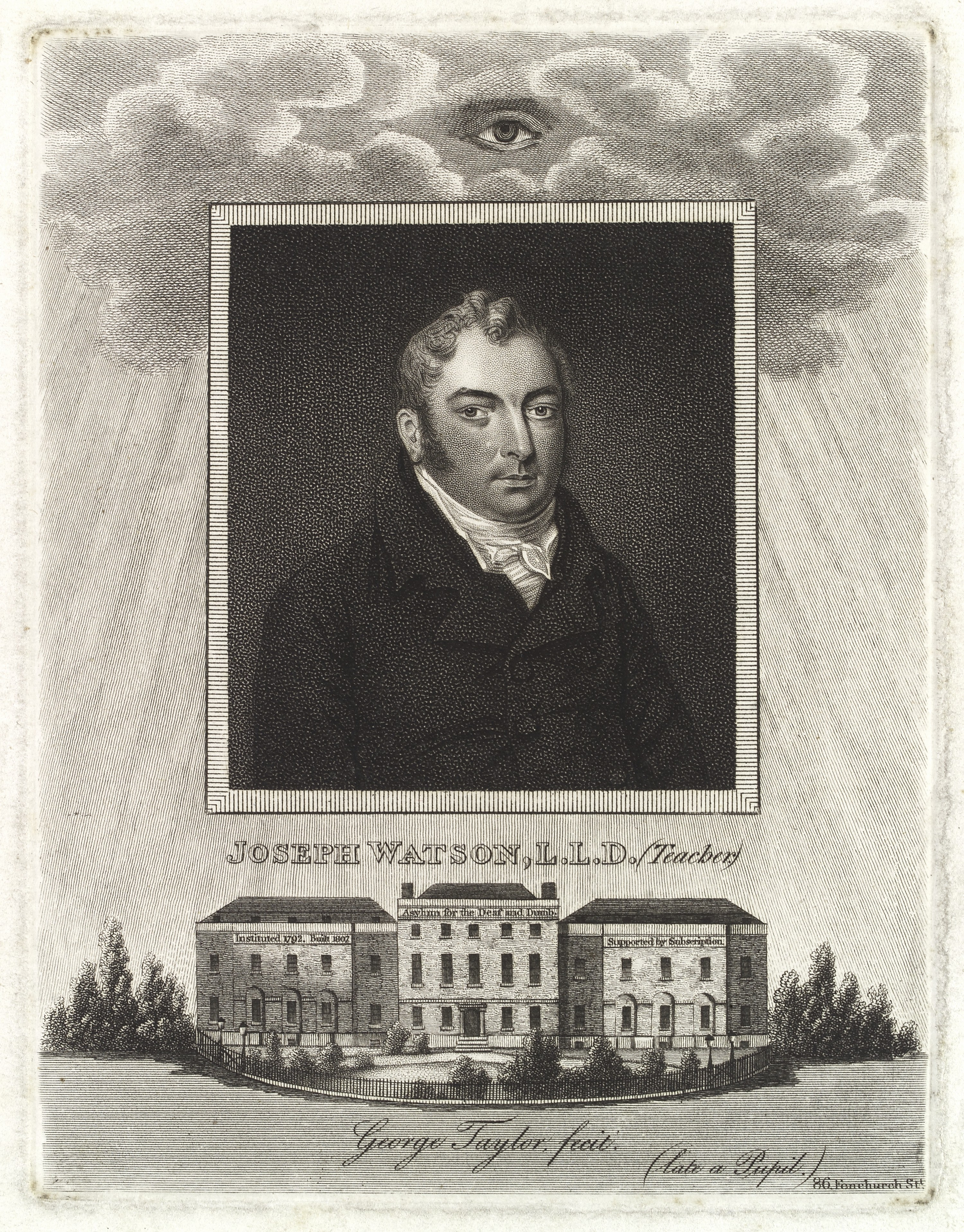
- Joseph Watson; below is the Asylum for the Deaf and Dumb
- Born: 1765
- Died: 23 November 1829
- Occupation: Educator
- Relatives: Thomas Braidwood (uncle)

Joseph Watson (c. 1765 – 23 November 1829) was an English teacher of deaf children, and writer on teaching the deaf.

== Life ==
=== Early life ===
Watson was educated in Hackney, London at the school of his uncle, Thomas Braidwood, and from 1784 he worked at the school.

=== Asylum for the Deaf and Dumb ===
In 1792 John Townsend, Henry Thornton, Henry Cox Mason, rector of Bermondsey, and others founded The Asylum for the Deaf and Dumb, financed by public subscription, making it the first charitable school for the deaf. Watson was also involved in its foundation, and was appointed principal. Originally it was in Grange Road, Bermondsey; in 1809 it moved to Old Kent Road. In 1810 the asylum had 70 pupils, and in 1820 it had 200. Watson's pupils included England's first deaf barrister, John William Lowe.

Watson was allowed up to eight private pupils (in addition to his other responsibilities), known as "parlour pupils", who were taught to speak, as well as to use sign language. His parlour pupils included Matthew Burns, a teacher and evangelist who set up his own schools for the deaf.

Francis Maginn, a co-founder of the British Deaf Association was also a student at the school.

==== Instructional methods ====
Watson's system was founded on that of Thomas Braidwood "with some developments and improvements", and he describes his teaching methods in detail in his book, On the Education of the Deaf and Dumb (1809), where he opposed the use of signed versions of spoken language - such as was used in the Paris school, and advocated for 'natural signing' - that is utilising their own grammatical structure. This 'natural signing' is likely to be the precursor to modern British Sign Language.

His book Instruction of the Deaf and Dumb again details his philosophy and his teaching methods. He wrote, "Persons born deaf are, in fact, neither depressed below, nor raised above, the general scale of human nature, as regards their dispositions and powers, either of body or mind." The book contains lists of vocabulary and plates designed to encourage a child to acquire an understanding of written and spoken language.

The Abbé Sicard, the French teacher of the deaf, was much interested in his methods, and corresponded with him about the school.

Watson is known to have trained Robert Kinniburgh who became head of Braidwood Academy in Edinburgh in 1813.

He remained in the office for the rest of his life. He died at the school on 23 November 1829, and was buried at Bermondsey.

== Family ==
His son Thomas James Watson was principal of the school until 1857; Thomas's son James Harrison Watson succeeded him. Joseph Watson's son Alexander Watson (c. 1815–1865) was an Anglican clergyman.

== Publications ==
Watson was the author of:

- On the Education of the Deaf and Dumb (1809)
- Instruction of the Deaf and Dumb; or a View of the Means by which they may be Taught to Speak and Understand a Language (London, 1810, 2 volumes)
- A First Reading Book for Deaf and Dumb Children (London, 1826)
- A Selection of Verbs and Adjectives, with some other Parts of Speech (London, 1826)
