= Ulster Institute for the Deaf =

Former charity in Northern Ireland

- Merged into: Royal National Institute for the Deaf (RNID), later Royal National Institute for Deaf People
- Type: Charity
- Location: Northern Ireland

The Ulster Institute for the Deaf (UID) was a Northern Ireland charity based in Belfast to support the Deaf Community in Ulster. In 1991 it merged into the Royal National Institute for the Deaf, later Action on Hearing Loss and now Royal National Institute for Deaf People (RNID).

It was originally an educational institution at Fisherwick Place, Belfast, where Francis Maginn (1861 – 1918), one of the founders of the British Deaf Association was its first superintendent.
