= UID =

UID may refer to:

== Identifying numbers ==
- Unique identifier and instances or systems thereof

=== In computing ===
- Unique identifier for a specific user of a computer system
- Unique ID for the Mifare series of chips (integrated circuits) used in contactless smart cards and proximity cards.
- Unique ID of a message in a folder on an IMAP server
- User identifier (Unix), a code identifying each user on a Unix and Unix-like systems
- Globally unique identifier (GUID)
- Universally unique identifier (UUID)

=== In other areas ===
- PubMed 'Unique Identifier' parameter (PMID) designating specific scientific publication abstracts (PubMed § PubMed identifier)
- 'Unique Item Identifier', a specific value in the IUID (Item Unique Identification) system used by the United States Department of Defense for the identification of accountable equipment according to DoD Instruction 5000.64
- Aadhaar number, originally the Unique Identification Number, an initiative of the Unique Identification Authority of India (UIDAI) of the Indian government to create a unique ID for every Indian resident
- uID Center, a nonprofit organization in Tokyo, Japan, responsible for the Ucode system for uniquely identifying real-world objects electronically
- German for: "UID = Umsatzsteuer Identifikation" (English: VAT identification number, VAT = value-added tax)

== Organizations ==
- Ulster Institute for the Deaf
- Umeå Institute of Design

== Other uses ==
- Unidentified decedent, a deceased person whose body has not yet been identified
- Unintelligent Design, a satirical reaction to the Intelligent Design movement
- Unit Identification, an LED used as a means of locating a specific computer server in a server room
- Universal Instructional Design, an educational method that tries to deliver teaching to meet the needs of wide variety of learners
- User interface design, device design with the focus on the user's experience and interaction

== See also ==
- IUD
