= Charles Shirreff (painter) =

Scottish painter

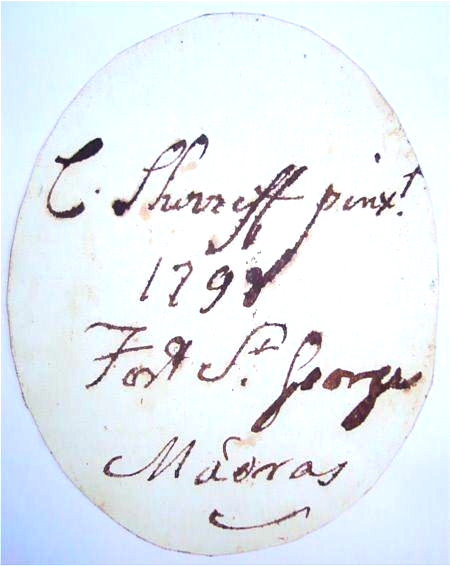
- Shirreff's signature on the reverse of a 1798 miniature
- Born: Charles Sheriff; 4 October 1749; Edinburgh, Scotland
- Died: 1829 (aged 79–80); London, U.K.
- Education: Royal Academy of Art
- Known for: Painting, portrait miniatures

Charles Shirreff (4 October 1749 – 1829) was a deaf Scottish painter, specializing in portrait miniatures.

== Early life and education ==
Charles Shirreff was born in 1749 to Alexander Shirreff and Agnes Young. His last name has, at times, been spelled as Sheriff, Sherrif, Sherriff, or Shirref. His father was a wealthy wine merchant of South Leith in Edinburgh.

At the age of three or four, Shirreff became deaf. In 1760, his father approached Thomas Braidwood, who was teaching mathematics in Edinburgh, seeking an education for the boy, then ten years old, in the hope that he could be taught to write. Charles became Braidwood's first deaf student; soon afterward, Braidwood founded Braidwood's Academy for the Deaf and Dumb, the first school of its kind in Britain.

At the age of 18, in August 1769, Shirreff left Braidwood's Academy to study art in London at the Royal Academy Schools. He graduated in 1772 with a silver medal, and took up a career as a miniaturist.

== Professional career ==
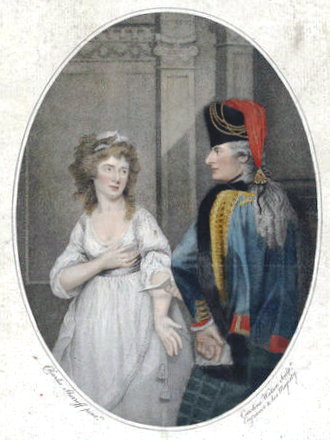
1785 hand-coloured engraving from Shirreff's miniature of Sarah Siddons and John Philip Kemble

In addition to painting portrait miniatures, Shirreff also produced pastels in his early years. Shirreff successfully exhibited oil paintings, pastels, and pencil drawings at the Royal Academy of Arts in 1771, and at the Free Society of Artists from 1770 until 1773.

Shirreff worked in London after graduating from the Royal Academy, building up a clientele that was mainly theatrical. He befriended Caleb Whitefoord, a well-connected Scottish merchant, diplomat, and political satirist who moved in London's wealthiest elite circles, where Shirreff developed advantageous associations with portraitists Sir Joshua Reynolds, George Dance the younger, and Richard Cosway.

After Shirreff's father had been financially ruined in the Crisis of 1772 by the failure of banking house Neal, James, Fordyce and Down, Shirreff supported the family with his work. He applied to go to India in 1778, stating in his application to the East India Company that he had no speech but was able to make himself understood by signs. He requested that he be accompanied by his father and his sister Mary to act as interpreters. However, his original plan to visit India was abandoned and he remained in England for two more decades.

Shirreff reportedly taught miniature painting in London to students that included, in 1786–1788, Scottish miniaturist Archibald Robertson.

Shirreff lived and worked in Bath either from 1791 to 1795, or from c. 1786 to 1800. His sitters included actress Sarah Siddons, who wrote of him as more successful in her portrait than any miniature painter she had sat to. During that period, he had clients for portraits in common with two other deaf miniaturists in Bath, Sampson Towgood Roch and Richard Crosse.

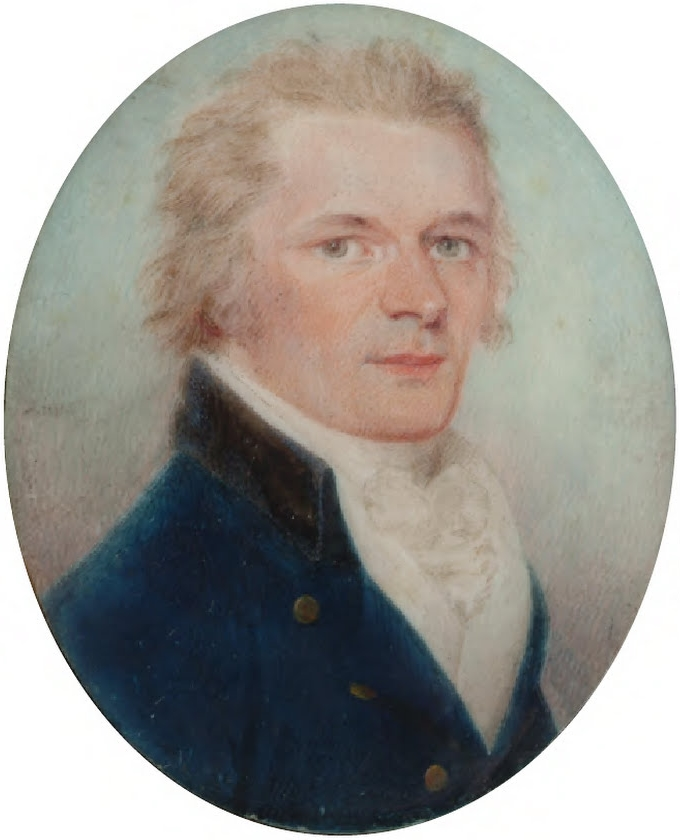
Miniature of Alexander Hamilton attributed to Shirreff, c. 1790

In 1795, he renewed his application to go to India, and left England in the Lord Hawkesbury, which reached Madras in January 1797. He painted in Madras for some years before moving to Calcutta, where he worked on his Illustrations of Signs. In 1807, he announced it was nearly completed and would be available to subscribers as soon as possible. This work has never been traced and is presumed lost in passage from India.

He returned from India in 1808 or 1809, and again took up residence in London, where he continued to work.

Shirreff's date of death, often given as c. 1830 or 1831, has been contested. More recent biographies give an earlier year of death, based on probate records showing that Shirreff must have died prior to 5 November 1829, when his will was proved in court.

== Personal life ==
On 11 January 1810, Shirreff married Mary Ann Brown, the sister of a fellow artist, at St George's, Hanover Square. The couple lived in London, in Fitzroy Square and later in Connaught Square, until his death.
