= Francis Maginn =

Irish missionary and deaf community advocate

- Francis Maginn
- Born: 21 April 1861; Mallow, County Cork, Ireland
- Died: 16 December 1918 (aged 57); Belfast, Ireland
- Resting place: Belfast City Cemetery
- Education: Royal London Asylum for the Deaf and Dumb then Gallaudet University
- Known for: Co-founder of the British Deaf Association / Superintendent of Ulster Institute for the Deaf

Francis Maginn (21 April 1861–16 December 1918) was a Church of Ireland missionary who worked to improve living standards for the deaf community by promoting sign language and was one of the co-founders of the British Deaf Association.

== Early life and education ==
Maginn was born in Mallow, County Cork, Ireland in 1861. His father was a Church of Ireland vicar, and his mother was well-connected to wealthy families in Ireland. His uncle William Maginn was a journalist who amongst other achievements co-founded and was a notable supporter of Fraser's Magazine. At the age of 5, he was about to be sent to Christ's Hospital (a famous boarding school in England), however he became deaf that year due to scarlet fever and his parents sent him to the Royal London Asylum for the Deaf and Dumb, which was on Old Kent Road at that time.

Maginn excelled at school and was offered a junior teachership at 17 in the Royal London Asylum's Margate Branch. He kept this position for five years, returned to Ireland for a year, and then went to the National Deaf-Mute College (later known as Gallaudet University) in Washington, DC. The move from Ireland to America had a profound effect on Maginn, who felt he now had the ability to achieve a higher level of attainment. He spent three years at Gallaudet and did not graduate because he had to leave to be at his father's bedside, but he left highly regarded and with letters of support (he received an honorary degree from Gallaudet in later life). Leaving Gallaudet, Maginn felt that the British approach to deafness was one of injustice, and that his life's work would be to enhance the quality of life for deaf in the United Kingdom.

== Return to Ireland and first steps towards a British Deaf Association ==
Maginn returned to Ireland in 1882, he wanted to identify a potential springboard to establish a national association and he joined the Deaf and Dumb Correspondence Association, which was led by some influential deaf people of that time. The first attempt to establish an association, the Deaf-Mute Association was formed on 1 February 1888 to 'further the cause of the deaf and dumb' but it was short-lived. There were 239 members recruited into its membership, but, due to insufficient numbers, the association closed in 1889.

Despite the closure of the association, Francis Maginn and James Paul, a missioner and founder of the National Deaf and Dumb Society, were funded to attend the event marking 100 years anniversary of the death of a French educator and "Father of the Deaf" Charles-Michel de l'Épée. They made a pact on the train journey to Paris, France, to re-establish a national association and, by the time they arrived in Calais on the way home, the British delegates lent their support.

== Royal Commission on the Blind, the Deaf and the Dumb ==
The UK Royal Commission for the Blind, the Deaf and the Dumb's report was published by Lord Egerton in 1889, recommending mandatory education for the deaf. Before publication, witnesses gave evidence to the commission, including Alexander Graham Bell who promoted the use of the pure oral method of education and proposed to prevent marriage between deaf people; the latter was rejected by the commission. Also, Edward Gallaudet gave evidence and promoted the developments in Washington, US. Maginn had previously met Bell while studying in America, and wrote that "The deaf mutes of the US recognise the fact that he is acting in all sincerity and with the best of intentions and that their esteem for him is not lessened by the contempt in which they hold his theories."

The Egerton Report was in response to the (now infamous) 1880 Milan Congress declaring that sign language was to be banned from schools teaching deaf children, which had the side-effect of excluding hundreds of deaf teachers, teaching assistants and care staff from deaf schools in Europe and North America. The Egerton Report supported the oral system.

Rev. William Blomefield Sleight, the son of William Sleight, head master of the Brighton Institute for the Deaf and Dumb, sat on the commission and signed it in 1889 with reservations, which were printed in The Times:

"The contention of Messrs. Owen and Sleight is that the Oral System breaks down in after life, and that its pupils not infrequently resort to writing and the manual alphabet. They, therefore, advocate the "Combined Method" -i.e., the main instruction being carried on by means of the finger alphabet and signs, articulation and lip-reading being taught as accomplishments to those who show aptitude for receiving such instruction." (24 October 1889)

== Founding of the British Deaf Association ==
In January 1890, a national conference for the deaf was held in St Saviour's Church for the deaf in London. Here, Maginn presented his views for improving the deaf education system in Britain. He proposed forming a national association for the deaf, and said that the American Combined Method education system, which incorporated fingerspelling, Signed English and lip-reading (the manualism approach), which gave access to English as a written language and spoken language, where possible.

At the conference, it was agreed that there should be a national association representing the deaf community in the British Empire. The conference was presided by Rev. William B. Sleight, he permitted the conference to start earlier on morning of 18 January 1890, to hear the proposal for the establishment of a new national association.

By consent, Francis Maginn was given the floor, and he spoke eloquently for the next half an hour or so about the need of an organised association that would command respect and watch other the interests of the deaf people in Britain, whether these interests be educational, moral or social.

As a consequence of this ruling, a special committee was set up to establish a constitution made up of six deaf and six hearing men, under the chairmanship of Rev. William B. Sleight. Francis would have preferred if no hearing people were involved in this committee but he was over-ruled and acceded to the majority of the conference. Maginn was one of the 6 Deaf men, who sat on this committee.

A new constitution was adopted by the committee, but there were concerns over two elements: the name of the new association; and the criteria for membership. First, instead of the "National Association for the Deaf," they decided on the name of "British Deaf And Dumb Association." Though it was pointed out that the word "dumb" was no longer in use in America, the term was not removed from their title, BDDA, until 1970. Secondly, though Maginn wanted only deaf people to become members, the steering group said they would allow hearing members who took an active interest in the welfare of the deaf, provided they were proposed by five deaf people. Maginn hotly disagreed with this decision, objecting to the idea of the "benevolent paternalism" of the hearing friends of the deaf. The Association championed the use of sign language in deaf schools rather than pure oral systems.

The Association was formed in the Lecture Hall of the Leeds Church Institute, in Albion Place, Leeds, on 24 July 1890. The membership admission criteria were heavily discussed and it was agreed that:

Persons who can hear taking an active interest in the welfare and education of the deaf and dumb, shall be eligible for admission to ordinary membership on the recommendation of five ordinary members of the association.

Sleight, a hearing man, was elected as the chairman of the association, and Maginn was given the role of regional vice-president; an honorary position with no real power, which was a blow to Maginn's confidence. Maginn himself gradually withdrew from the Association and concentrated his energy on Ulster Institute for the Deaf.

Maginn confined his later years to work in Belfast until his death in 1918. The British Deaf Association didn't have a deaf chair until the appointment of Jock Young as their first Deaf chair in the 1980s and their first deaf chief executive Jeff McWhinney was appointed in the 1990s.

== Ulster Institute for the Deaf ==
Despite his failure to create the first fully representative association of deaf people in the UK, he rescinded his role in the BDDA and went back to Belfast to focus on his work as the superintendent at the Ulster Institute for the Deaf, where he was much appreciated by Ulster's deaf community.

== Legacy ==
He is the only deaf historical figure native to the UK and Ireland that is still talked about and respected by the deaf community a century later.
