= Braidwood Academy =

School in Edinburgh, Scotland

Braidwood's Academy was a school for the deaf founded in 1760 by Thomas Braidwood, a Scottish educator and pioneer in developing the hand gestures of sign language, the forerunner of British Sign Language (BSL). The school is significant in the history of deaf education, as it is the first school for deaf children in Britain. The 18th-century Edinburgh building in which the school was first housed was later known as Dumbie House and Craigside House, and has since been demolished. In 1783 the school was re-formed in Hackney, just north of London; that building too no longer stands.

== History ==
=== Establishment in Scotland ===
In 1760, merchant Alexander Shirreff asked Thomas Braidwood, who at the time was teaching mathematics in Edinburgh, if he would teach his deaf son, Charles Shirreff. Braidwood's second pupil was John Douglas, the son of a doctor in London. Aside from teaching deaf children, Braidwood also advertised that he could correct speech impediments and stuttering in hearing pupils.

=== The English method ===
At this point in the history of deaf education, there were two competing systems: the French method (manualism) and the German one (oralism), espoused by Abbé de l'Epée and Samuel Heincke respectively. Braidwood's methods leaned more towards oralism, developing speech and articulation in his pupils, but there is evidence that he also included signing and the manual alphabet. This combined system would come to be known as the English method. It is likely that the signing used in instruction followed the structure of spoken English, something that one of Braidwood's successors, Joseph Watson, would seek to change.

Although Braidwood never documented his own methods, there are several second-hand accounts which describe them. A visitor reported pupils learnt first by writing words, understanding their meaning and then lipreading. Francis Green, whose son Charles attended the Braidwood school, describes in the treatise Vox oculis subjecta, how his son would surely develop "a perfect acquaintance with language both oral and written", and how deaf pupils were given "a tolerable general understanding of their own language [English] so as to read, write, and speak it, with ease".

Green also describes Braidwood's views of spoken language which "confused the gift of speech with the gift of reason":

"Mr Braidwood hath frequently intimated to me, as an opinion founded upon his experience in this art, that articulate or spoken language hath so great and essential a tendency to confirm and enlarge ideas, above the power of written language, that it is almost impossible for deaf persons, without the use of speech, to be perfect in their ideas."

In October 1773, Samuel Johnson visited the school while traveling through Scotland, writing:

"There is one subject of philosophical curiosity in Edinburgh which no other city has to show; a College for the Deaf and Dumb, who are taught to speak, to read and to write, and to practise arithmetic, by a gentleman whose name is Braidwood. The number which attends him is, I think, about twelve, which he brings together into a little school, and instructs according to their several degrees of proficiency."

=== Growing reputation ===
Owing to visits by Johnson, his travelling compantion James Boswell, and the likes of Lord Monboddo, the school's reputation grew beyond Britain and into Europe. By 1780, the school had twenty pupils.

=== Move to London ===
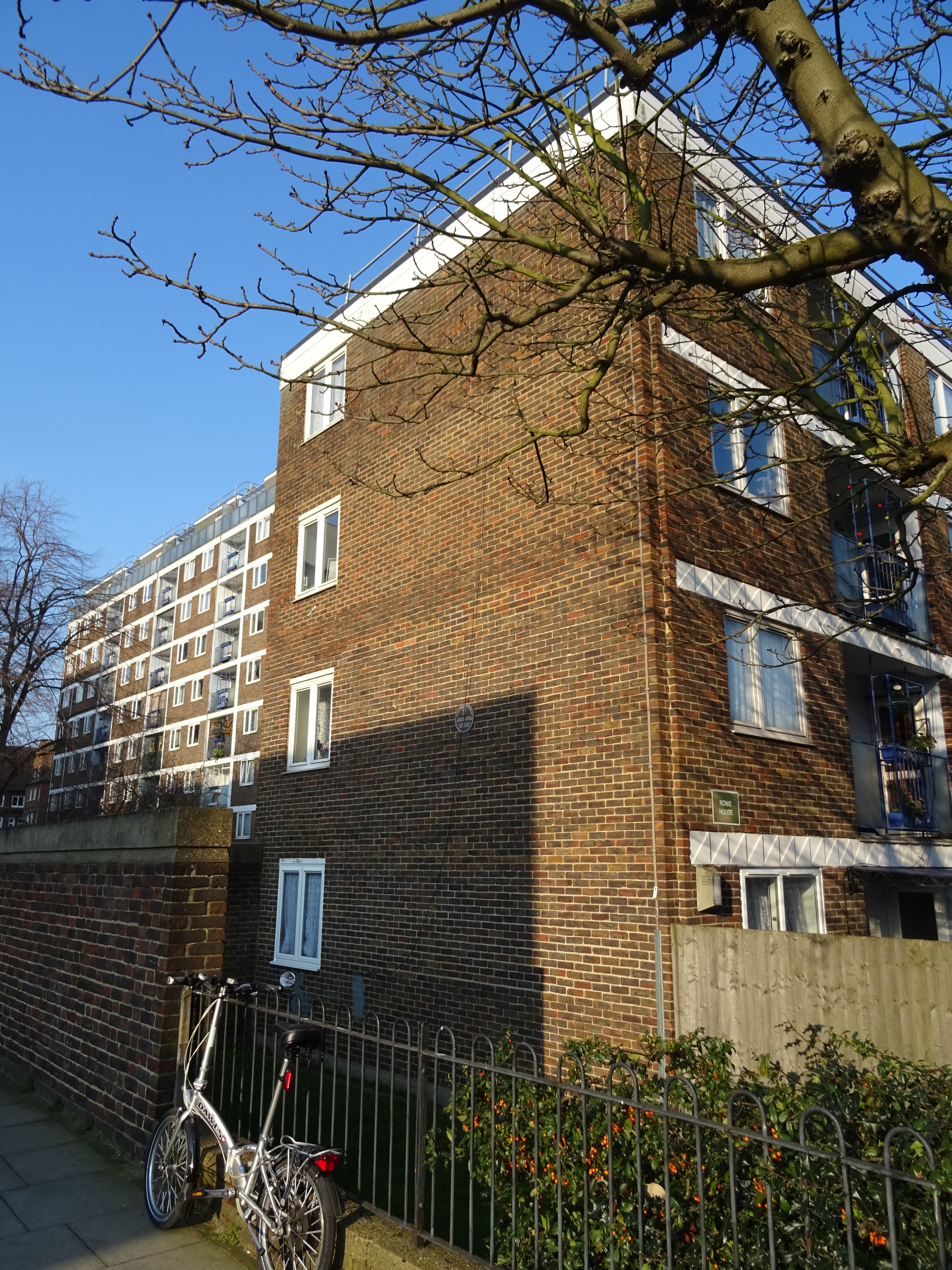
20 Chatham Place, Hackney - where Braidwood Academy For The Deaf And Dumb once stood

In 1783 Thomas Braidwood relocated to Hackney, then a village a few miles north of London, already known for its innovative educational establishments such as the Dissenting academies. There he re-established the Braidwood Academy for the Deaf and Dumb.

André-Daniel Laffon de Ladebat, one of the French visitors to the Braidwood school in 1815, provided a vivid description of Laurent Clerc's meeting with the deaf children in the bilingual English/French book, A collection of the Most Remarkable Definitions and Answers of Massieu and Clerc, Deaf and Dumb. Clerc, who was deaf, was overjoyed to find fellow sign language users:

As soon as Clerc beheld this sight [of the children at dinner] his face became animated; he was as agitated as a traveller of sensibility would be on meeting all of a sudden in distant regions, a colony of his own countrymen... Clerc approached them. He made signs and they answered him by signs. The unexpected communication cause a most delicious sensation in them and for us was a scene of expression and sensibility that gave us the most heart-felt satisfaction.

Braidwood died in 1806 and his family continued to run the school until c.1810.

=== Continuation of the Edinburgh School ===
By 1814, the original Braidwood Academy in Edinburgh was under the instruction of Robert Kinniburgh, the son of a flax draper, originally from Kirkintulloch, Lanarkshire. According to a deaf pupil of his, Alexander Atkinson, prior to becoming an assistant to Thomas Braidwood, Kinniburgh was a minister in Perth. He is said to have trained under Joseph Watson in London before returning to run the school in 1813. Kinninburgh's sister-in-law Miss Macpherson, also helped in the running of the school.

At this time, the school had between 40 and 50 students, mostly from across Scotland. Around 15 of the pupils were parlour boarders, while the rest had their places funded by charity. They were taught a combination of signing and writing with some articulation, the latter also taught by Kinniburgh's wife.

A formalised style of signing, or "dialect", developed in the school. "Founded on our [pupils'] natural signs, it was systematised for the purpose of securing a common understanding between teacher and pupil in the higher tasks of education."

In the spring of 1818, around half the school became ill with typhus fever, leading those infected to be temporarily rehoused on Gilmore Place.

== Legacy ==
The area of Edinburgh in which Braidwood Academy was originally located became known as Dumbiedykes - itself named after Braidwood school's 'deaf and dumb' pupils. Craigside House was demolished in 1939, though a section of the walls still stands opposite 36 Dumbiedykes Road. A commemorative plaque was placed on the site in 2015.

== References in culture ==
Sir Walter Scott mentioned Braidwood Academy in his novel The Heart of Midlothian (1818).

== Former pupils ==
In addition to the painter Charles Shirreff, Braidwood's pupils included:

- John Goodricke, astronomer
- Francis Mackenzie, 1st Baron Seaforth, MP and governor of Barbados
- John Philip Wood, author, genealogist, editor and Over Deputy of the Scottish Excise Office

== See also ==
- Donaldson's School for the Deaf - another deaf school in Edinburgh
