= Deafness in Germany =

Of the over 84 million people that live in Germany, approximately 235,000 are estimated to be 'deaf or hard of hearing' (DHH). Germany has a rich history regarding Deaf rights and education, with the first School for the Deaf founded in 1778. Germany's sign language, DGS (Deutsche Gebärdensprache), is rich and protected by legislation, such as the United Nations' Convention on the Rights of Persons with Disabilities, which Germany ratified in 2009. Overall, DHH people have many rights offered to them by the government, but it appears that there is a large push for diagnosed infants to utilize aids and implants, whereas learning sign language is an afterthought. It is also currently unclear if these rights are actively being used and pursued. In terms of healthcare, many deaf Germans seem to be hesitant to seek medical attention for fear of communication concerns. This impacts the community as a whole in terms of lower rates of health literacy as a whole, and higher rates of health disparities, both physical and mental.

== Human and civil rights for DHH people in Germany ==
=== The UN CRPD and Germany's State Party Report(s) ===
The United Nations' Convention on the Rights of Persons with Disabilities (CRPD) aims to maintain the rights of DHH people. Germany ratified in 2009, and ratified the optional protocol to the CRPD as well in 2009 and as such, it must report on the status of disability rights in the country in its prescribed reports. Germany's initial country report was published in 2011, and a joint second and third country report published in 2019. No NGOs were listed as contributors to the reports.

While the UN's CRPD protects the rights of everyone with disabilities as a whole, the World Federation of the Deaf acknowledges the following topics of interest to the D/deaf community:

==== Deaf culture and rights ====
Regarding sign language rights, Germany's state party report lays out that in fostering communication, films using sign language are recognized as beneficial and those that are DHH have the right to communicate with the government in German Sign Language (DGS) or otherwise without themselves paying for translators or additional technology. Also, this work cements that DGS is recognized as its own language and DHH people have the right to communicate in DGS in front of the government. This develops into upholding deaf culture and linguistic identity as broadcasting services are pushed to offer subtitling or sign language interpretations. For example, an act titled "The Film Promotion Act" aims for in-depth subtitling of cinema, especially for those going to watch in-person. In a 2009 study, the Film Promotion Institute found that 84% of cinemas were accessible and 6% were able to provide hearing aids for those who needed them.

==== Education, employment, and accessibility ====
In the first report and the combined second and third reports, there is no mention as to steps taken to integrate DGS education into schools. However, to support lifelong learning, a project titled "Hearing impairment and accessibility" proposed to provide more job opportunities for DHH people and protect them from job-loss. In order to minimize restrictions to the job force, frameworks are being developed to encourage accessibility and the learning of life-long transferable skills. Brandenburg is citied as a state working on the project "Transition from school to work" that would make entering the workforce more accessible with a special concentration in soft skills to aid in the transition.

The report also expands into accessibility rights, particularly in a court room as a translator or technology assistance is provided. A number of unspecific research projects are also being pursued that pertain to DHH people. There is also an intent to create a service so that telecommunication is available to those who are DHH via technological translation and was included in an act of the Telecommunications Act. Finally, in terms of equal participation advancement, it is stated that for those with hearing levels, speech amplification services are being provided on railways. Also, for elections, federal and European, a walk-through video in DGS is provided to help those who are DHH navigate the site.

== Sign language of Germany ==
=== DGS overview ===
As of February 6, 2025, German Sign Language, also known in German as Deutsche Gebardensprache (DGS), is one of the only sign languages native solely to Germany, outside of dialects that are spoken in different regions of Germany. This is regarded as a deaf-community sign language, meaning that it emerged from DHH people coming together without a previous, common sign language. DGS was recognized as an official language in 2002 under the Disability Equality Act. The EGIDS level for German Sign Language is 5.0, which communicates that this language is developing, and is characteristic of a "language [that] is in vigorous use, with literature in a standardized form being used by some through this is not yet widespread or sustainable". As of April 25, 2022, DGS is reported to be used by at least 200,000 people, 80,000 of whom are deaf.

=== Language relation ===
It is accredited that Israeli Sign Language was created from German Sign Language by DHH Jews that fled to Israel during the Nazi regime.

== Screening and intervention ==
=== Universal Newborn Hearing Screening ===
Starting in 2008 Germany has a mandated UNHS (Universal Newborn Hearing Screening). There following statistics all come from a report released in 2020 on the status of UNHS in countries.

Screening statistics:

- 96% of newborns are screened
  - 38% by OAE, 42% by OAE-AABR, 20% by AABR, NICUs
- 5.5% of newborns screened are referred for diagnostic follow-up
  - However, 20.8% of these were lost to follow-up
- In 1,000 newborns 2.7% are diagnosed with uni- and bilateral hearing levels, of which 48-63% are diagnosed with bilateral hearing levels.
- There average age of screened newborns for diagnosis is 4 months, and the average age that treatment begins is 5 months.
  - However, for non-screened newborns, the average age for diagnosis is 25 months, and the average age of treatment start is 28 months.

=== Early intervention ===
Early intervention services typically follow diagnosis after NHS is performed, and can vary between hearing aid use, cochlear implant use, or sign language incorporation. Children have access to hearing aids given that their provider follows outlined protocols. It is estimated that over half of diagnosed children utilize cochlear implants past the newborn stage. This is considered low on the global scale when compared to similar countries. This difference is attributed to "counseling issues". "Treatment start", which is credited as 5 months old for screened newborns, and 28 months old for non-screened newborns, is thus, for a majority of deaf infants usually focused towards hearing aids and implant usage.

== Healthcare for DHH community ==
=== Legislation ===
Healthcare professionals in Germany are taught against a pre-determined skillset set by the National Competence-Based Learning Objectives for Undergraduate Medical Education (NKLM). The overall goal of student's trainings regarding members of the DHH community is to be flexible enough to adapt on the spot to patient's specific needs. Further legislature has been passed, such as the 2nd section of article 17 of Social Code I, which states that "persons with hearing disabilities and persons with speech disabilities, while executing social benefits, in particular during medical examinations and treatments, have the right to communicate, in [DGS], speech supported signs or other suitable communication aids". The social service providers are obliged to cover the costs of interpretation or other communication aids".

Also, "the Assistance Regulation concerning illness, care, and birth grants people with hearing loss the right to have expenses for communication aids covered, where a health care service is medically necessary, in administrative proceedings the right to use a communication aid according to article 9 of the Disability Equality Act, and if it is the only way to ensure information flow between the service provider and the entitled person".

=== Communication concerns ===
All in all, there are estimated to be 200,000 DGS users, but only 500 DGS interpreters. Along with this, research has shown that the greatest cause for concern regarding communication issues was people not knowing their own right to an interpreter that is provided free of charge, however those of higher education were found to be more aware of their personal rights. Beyond those of lower education, deaf people who are younger and more family-dependent were found to understand the law less and were less likely to emancipate themselves, and those who were older were not informed of their personal rights or were even denied requests for slower speech to allow for lip-reading.

The following information comes from the same survey done on deaf Germans who were reporting on their recent healthcare experiences. It was found that 32% of deaf patients were satisfied or very satisfied with recent unplanned doctor's visits. Between both parties, 57% report wholly avoiding doctors' visits, even when presenting with symptoms, no matter how severe. The largest concern reported is not being understood by healthcare professionals. Almost as pressing concerns were: general communication barriers, having to put in too much effort because of their own disability, and general concerns of being misunderstood by their own doctor. A large majority reported "low to medium confidence" that they would have good acute, or in the moment, access to healthcare. In emergency situations, the most prevalent concern is "feeling helpless or dependent".

However, text messaging and social media have been used and have been seen to be successful in select areas to aid communication. Overall, it is recognized that nationwide solutions for the emergency deployment of sign language interpreters or medical staff with sign language skills still have to be developed, as, for instance, the emergency medicine practice is to speak slowly and hope for reliance on lip-reading. A project at the Robert Bosch Hospital in Stuttgart titled "Hand in Hand. Improvement of medical care for deaf patients" was developed that aimed to aid and prepare the hospital staff to provide treatment for deaf individuals.

=== Health literacy ===
The same survey as above found that those in the Deaf community yielded "high scores in reading and writing but low in lip-reading/understanding spoken language", with those who are born deaf yielding lower scores than those who are deafened. Those with cochlear implants reported higher scores overall than those without. In general, those with higher education and urban environments reported receiving more help. This is troubling for older deaf people with lower literacy rates, particularly those who are isolated and are fluent enough in German to allow for lip-reading.

In general, it was found that newspapers, magazines, the Internet, and television are the main used sources of health information. However, due to the literacy rates discussed above, the written material was not always fully understood. Information is more likely to be shared between members of the community, however there is great concern about lacking information within certain demographics. Looking forward, it was found that "breaking the vicious cycle through positive communicative experiences, such as available SLIs, time resources dedicated to understanding DHH patients' concerns, health care professionals trained in the care and communication of DHH patients, or awareness of DHH people rights could increase DHH patients' satisfaction and foster their trust in the medical system. Moreover, technological innovations that enable emergency calls in sign language or video calls with SLIs during an unscheduled medical consultation could also increase satisfaction and create more inclusive and accessible medical support".

=== Health disparities ===
Preventative healthcare is typically seen as the first line of defense for most preventable and treatable illnesses. However, among the DHH community, it was found that there were overall lower uses of preventative healthcare services that overall lead to longer outpatient and inpatient treatment times. As discussed above, older adults with lower literacy rates are less likely to receive the proper help that they need and are as such a group of great concern. As they are also less likely to seek out preventative medicine, older males with lower literacy rates, who are already at risk, are even more susceptible to chronic diseases such as coronary heart disease and diabetes.

In terms of mental health, a study was conducted between three, evenly numbered groups: one of deaf people with diagnosed mental disorders, one of hearing people with diagnosed mental disorders, and one of hearing people with no diagnosed hearing disorders. It was found that the two hearing groups, despite one group being the diagnosed group, did not have many notable differences and were standardized as the control group. The diagnosed and Deaf group, on the other hand, were found to have significantly higher rates in different fields. For instance, "participants perceive a lower quality of life, suffer from more psychosomatic symptoms, and show more pronounced personality traits".
