= Thomas Braidwood =

Scottish educator (1715–1806)

Thomas Braidwood (1715–1806) was a Scottish educator, significant in the history of deaf education. He was the founder of Britain's first school for the deaf.

== Early life ==
The fourth child of Thomas Braidwood and Agnes Meek, Braidwood was born in 1715 at Hillhead Farm, Covington, South Lanarkshire, Scotland.

== Professional career ==
=== Teaching career in Scotland ===
Braidwood originally established himself as a writing teacher, instructing the children of the wealthy at his home in the Canongate in Edinburgh.

In 1760, he accepted his first deaf pupil, Charles Shirreff (1749–1829), who later became known as a painter of portrait miniatures. Shirreff, then ten years old, was the son of Alexander Shirreff, a wealthy wine merchant based at the port of Leith, who convinced Braidwood to undertake to teach the deaf-mute child to write.

Braidwood changed his vocation from teaching exclusively hearing pupils to teaching the deaf, and renamed his building Braidwood's Academy for the Deaf and Dumb, the first school of its kind in Britain. Braidwood developed a combined system for educating deaf students, which included a form of sign language and the study of articulation and lip reading, which would come to be known as the English method. This early use of sign language was the forerunner of British Sign Language, recognized as a language in its own right in 2003.

=== Career in London ===
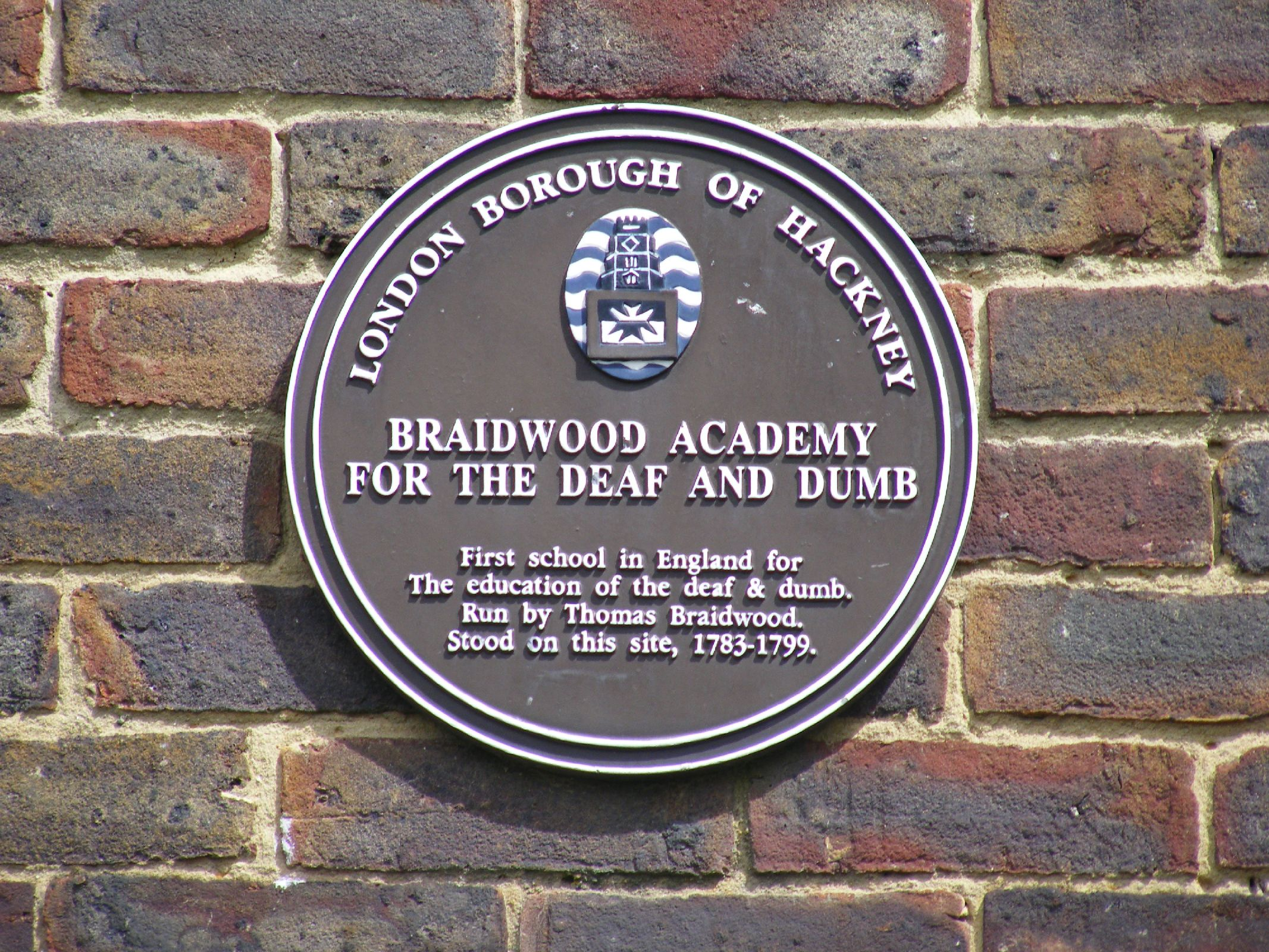
Plaque at 20 Chatham Road, Hackney where Braidwood's Academy once stood

In 1783 Thomas Braidwood moved with his family to Hackney in what is now the East End of London, but then was a rural village with easy connections to the capital. Hackney in the 18th century was known for its experimental educational establishments such as the Dissenting Academies. The same year, Braidwood established the Braidwood Academy for the Deaf and Dumb in Bowling Green House, later called Grove House, off Mare Street. A block of flats now stands where the Academy once was, adorned with a plaque describing its existence.

Joseph Watson, a nephew of Braidwood, began working with him in 1784. In 1792, Dr. Watson went on to become the first head teacher of the Asylum for the Deaf and Dumb, which was established on Old Kent Road in Bermondsey.

== Personal life and family ==
Braidwood married Margaret Pearson on 1 October 1752. The couple had three daughters, all born in Edinburgh: Margaret, born 4 September 1755; Elizabeth born 1757; and Isabella, born 27 January 1758.

All three daughters followed Braidwood in becoming teachers of the deaf, and Isabella continued the running of the school after Braidwood's death in 1806. Little is known about Margaret, and there is no mention or record of her having moved south of the Scottish border with her family in 1783. Elizabeth married early to a Durham surgeon and went to live in his city.

In 1810, one of Braidwood's grandsons became head of a school in Edinburgh, and another, head of a school in Birmingham.

A grandson, John Braidwood, began tutoring deaf students in Virginia in 1812, and ran the short-lived Cobbs School for the deaf from its founding in 1815 until its demise in the fall of 1816.

Braidwood was a distant cousin of Thomas Braidwood Wilson (1792–1843), after whom the Australian town of Braidwood, New South Wales is named.

== Tribute ==
On 6 September 2017 Google celebrated the British Sign Language and the Braidwood Academy with a Google Doodle.
