= John Townsend (educator) =

English benefactor (1757–1826)

The Reverend John Townsend
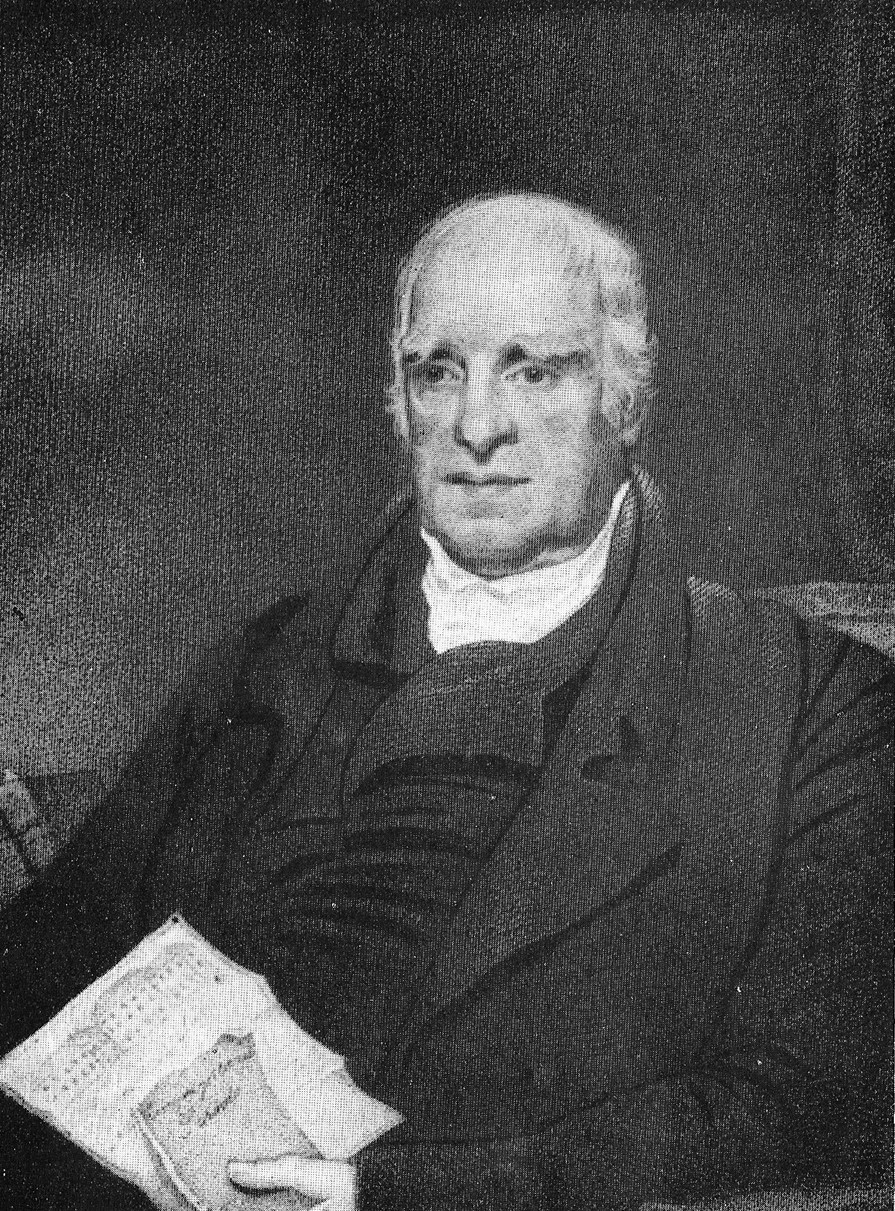
- Born: 24 March 1757; Whitechapel, London, England
- Died: 7 February 1826; Bermondsey, London, England
- Education: Christ's Hospital
- Spouse: Cordelia Cahusac

Ecclesiastical career
- Church: Jamaica Row Chapel, Bermondsey
- Ordained: 1 July 1781

John Townsend (24 March 1757 – 7 February 1826) was a Congregationalist minister, and founder of both the Asylum for the Deaf and Dumb, the first public institution in England for deaf children and Caterham School.

== Life ==
Townsend was born in Whitechapel, London in 1757, son of Benjamin Townsend, a pewterer, and his wife Margaret. He was educated at Christ's Hospital from 1766 until 1771, when he began a seven-year apprenticeship to his father. From 1774 he was drawn to preaching; in June 1781 he was ordained pastor of the Independent Church at Kingston upon Thames. In the same month he married Cordelia Cahusac, and they later had children.

He found that William Huntington, who resided in Kingston, was influencing his congregation by his antinomian views, so he resigned his charge, and in October 1784 became minister of the Jamaica Row Chapel in Bermondsey, London.

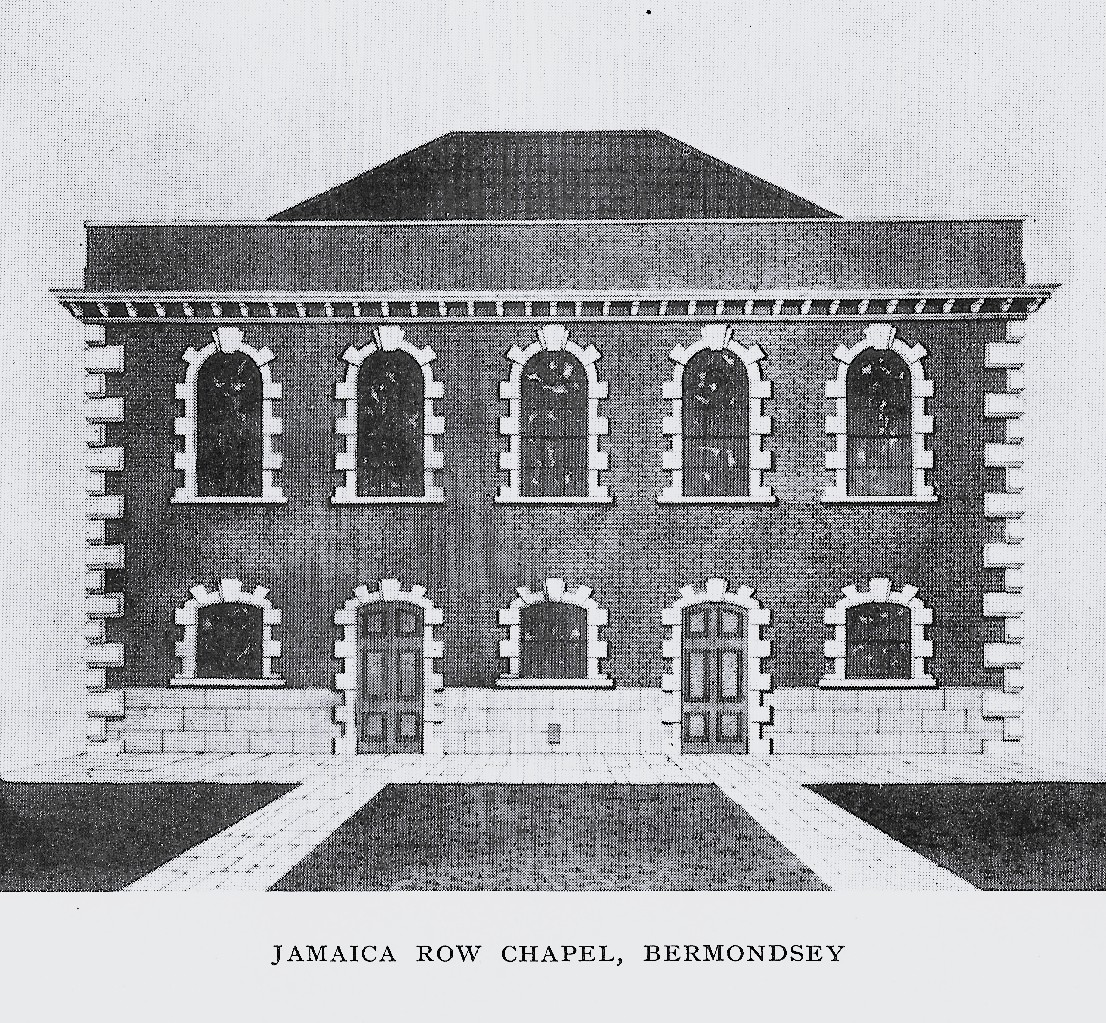
The Jamaica Row Chapel, in Bermondsey

In 1792, with the assistance of Henry Cox Mason, rector of Bermondsey, Henry Thornton and others, he founded the Asylum for the Deaf and Dumb in the parish of Bermondsey. It rapidly grew in public esteem. On 11 July 1807 the first stone of a purpose-built school in Old Kent Road was laid by the Duke of Gloucester. The first headteacher was Joseph Watson, who had been educated at Thomas Braidwood's school for the deaf. By 1815 the institution was greatly oversubscribed. (A second building was opened in Margate in 1876, and the entire school moved there from London in 1906; the institution, by then known as the Royal School for Deaf Children, closed in 2015.)

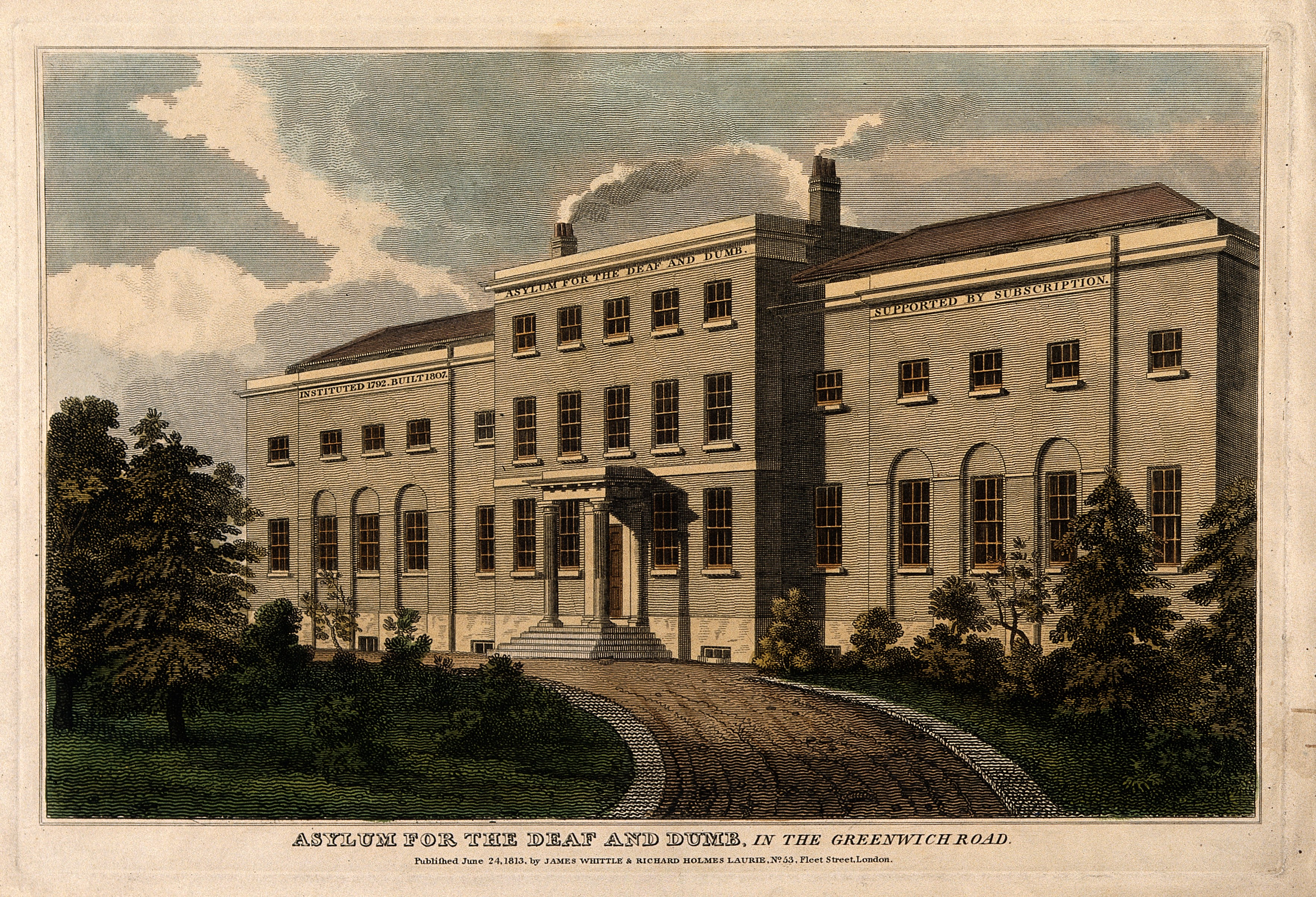
Asylum for the Deaf and Dumb

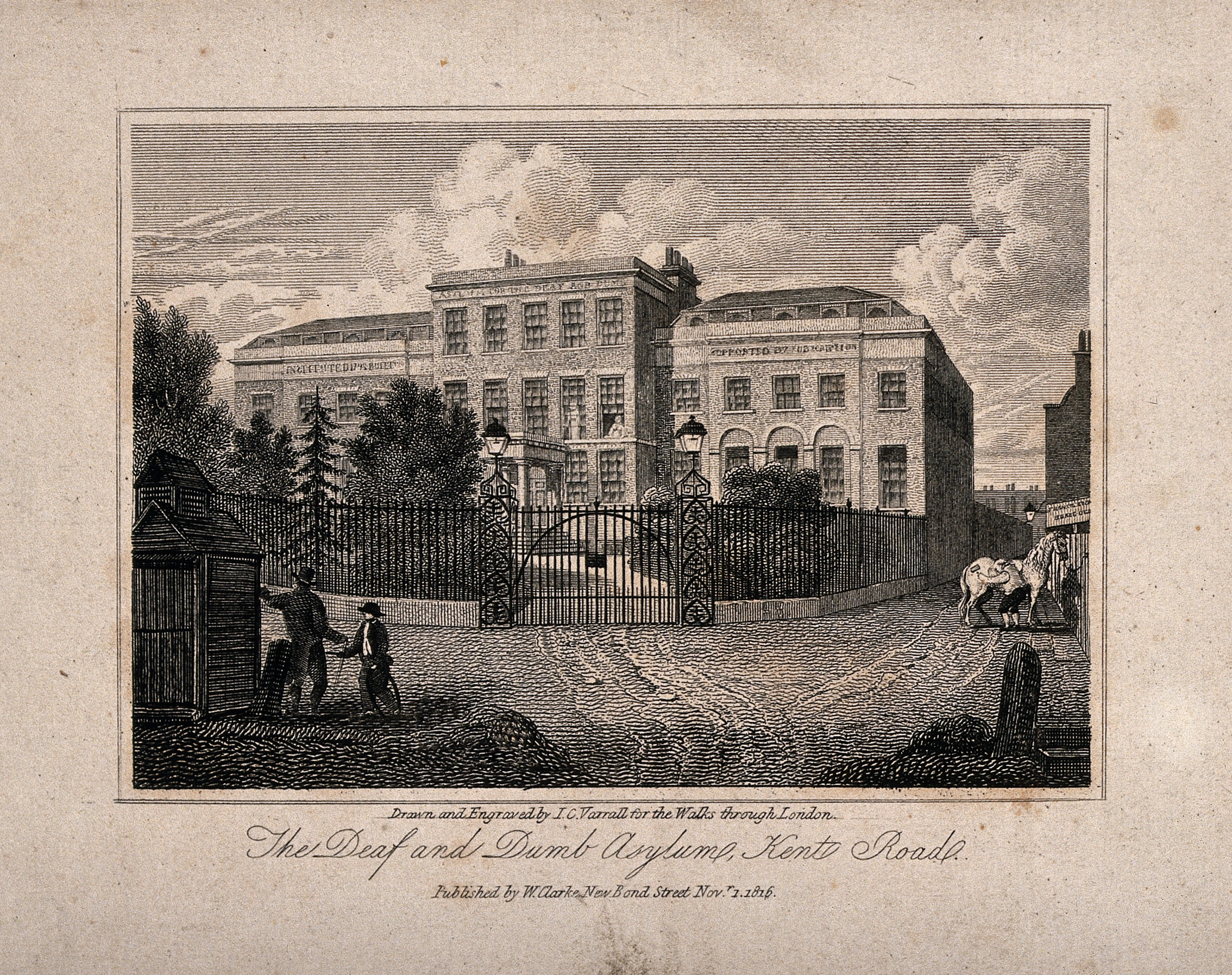
The asylum was well-known enough to be depicted in Varrall's 'Walks through London' series.

Townsend was also involved in founding the London Missionary Society in 1794, and the British and Foreign Bible Society (for which he suggested the name) in 1802. In September 1810 Townsend, aware of the poverty of his fellow ministers and the insufficient education of their children, published a letter "To the Ministers, Officers, and all other Members and Friends of the Congregational Churches in England". In 1811 a school was established for the free education of the sons of poor independent ministers, and in 1815 a house was taken at Lewisham to accommodate the children. This school later became Caterham School.

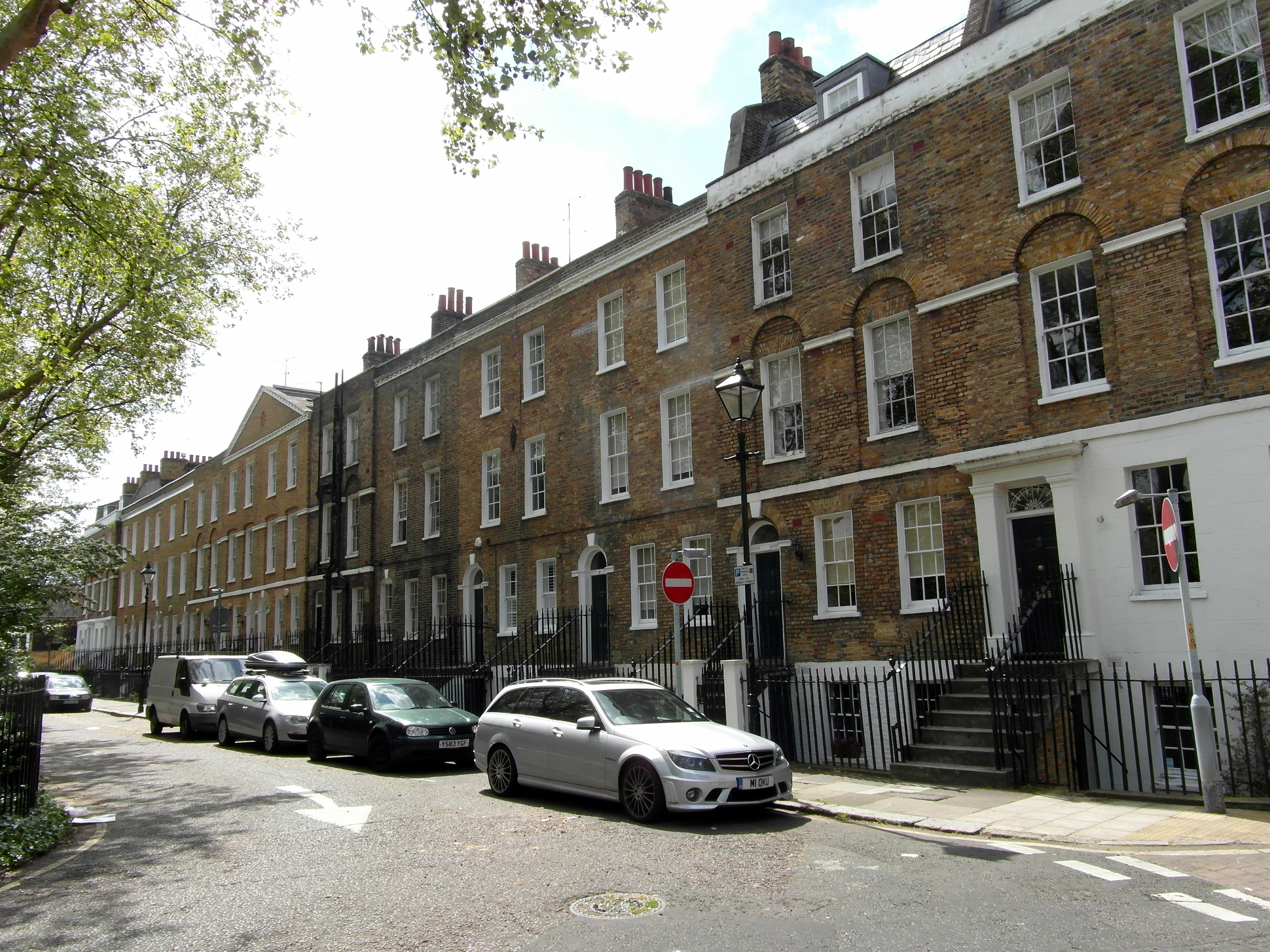
Townsend founded the Congregational School at West Square, Newington in 1811

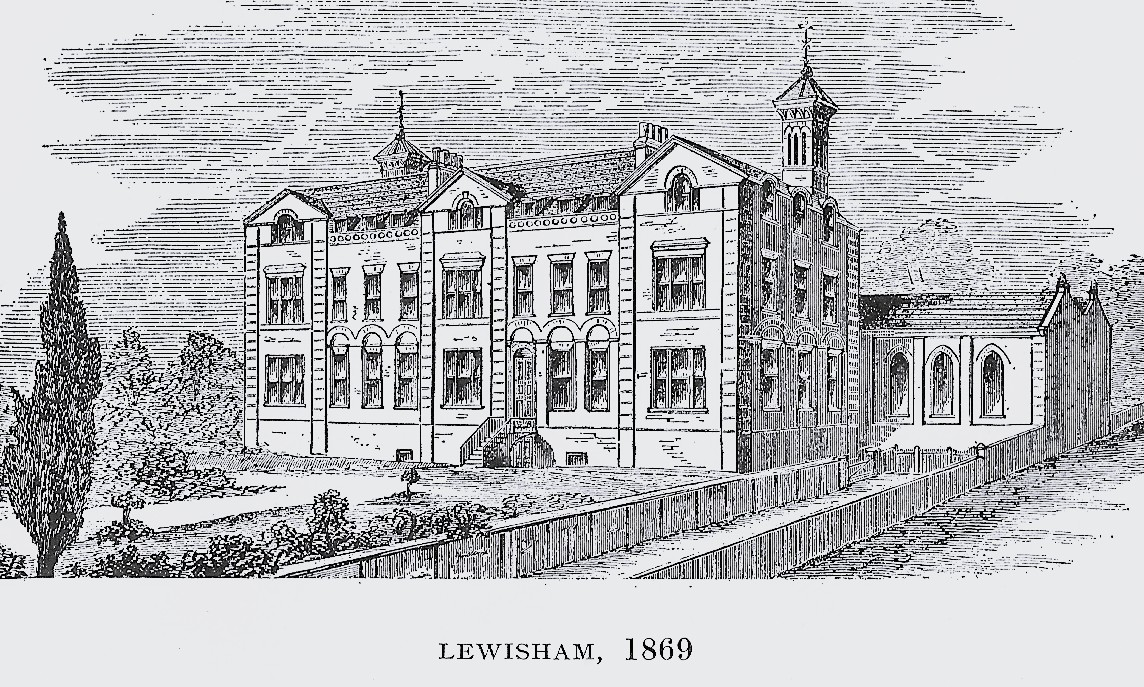
In 1815, the Congregational School moved to Lewisham.

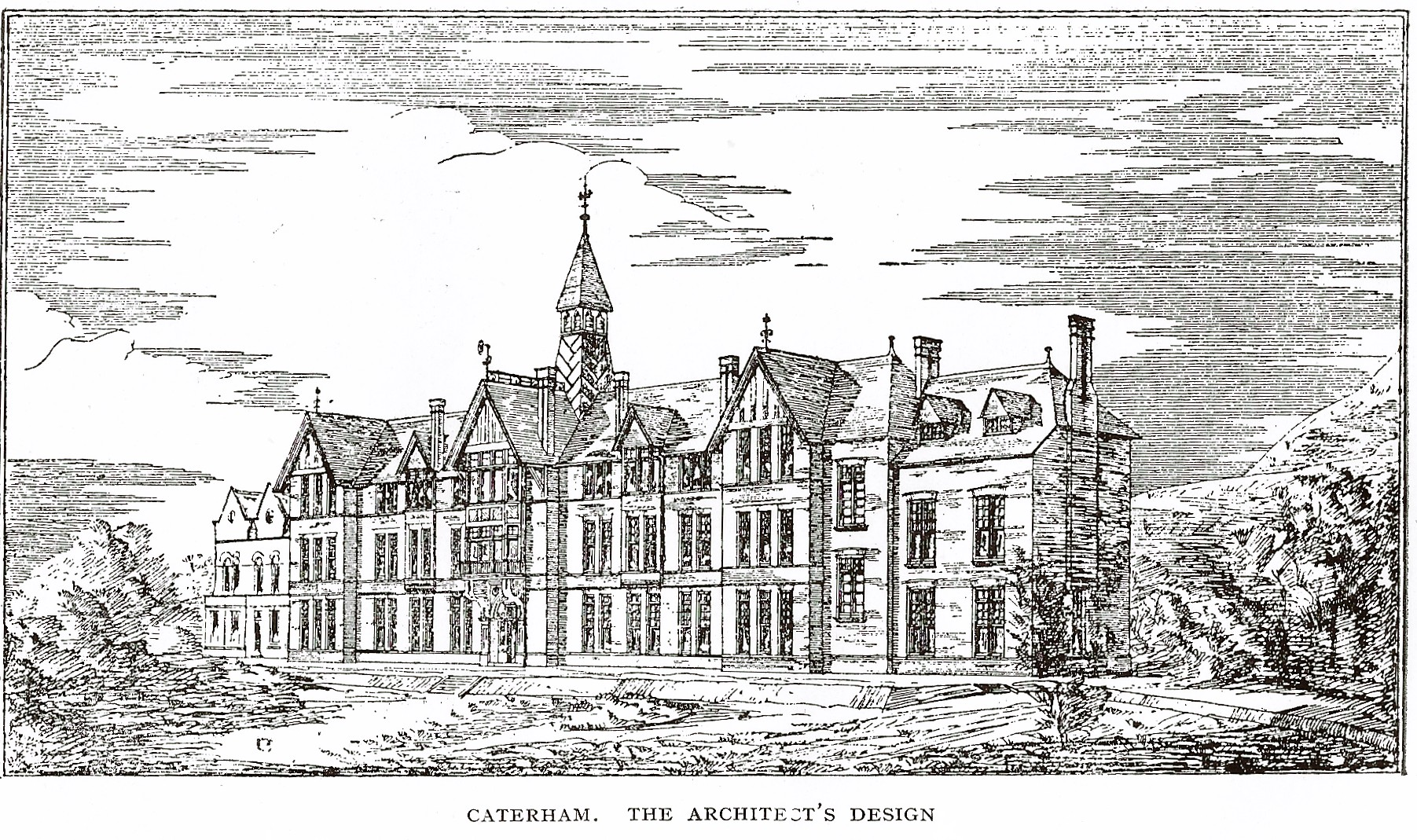
In 1884, the Congregational School moved from Lewisham to Caterham and became Caterham School.

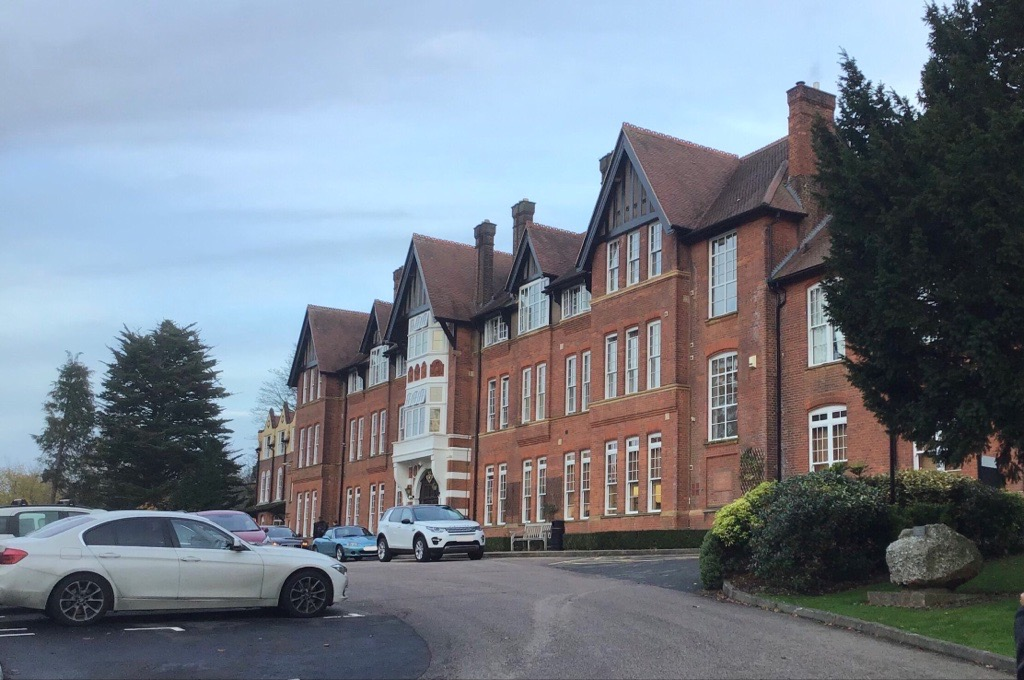
The Old School and Main Court at Caterham today.

Townsend died in Bermondsey on 7 February 1826.

== Publications ==
Townsend also published:

- "Three Sermons addressed to Old, Middle-aged, and Young People" (London, 1797)
- "Nine Sermons on Prayer" (London, 1799)
- "Hints on Sunday-schools and Itinerant Preaching" (London, 1801)
- An abridgement of Bunyan's The Pilgrim's Progress (London, 1806)
- A life of Jean Claude, prefixed to a translation of his "Defence of the Reformation" (London, 1815)
