= Markus Reich =

Jewish German deaf educator (1844–1911)

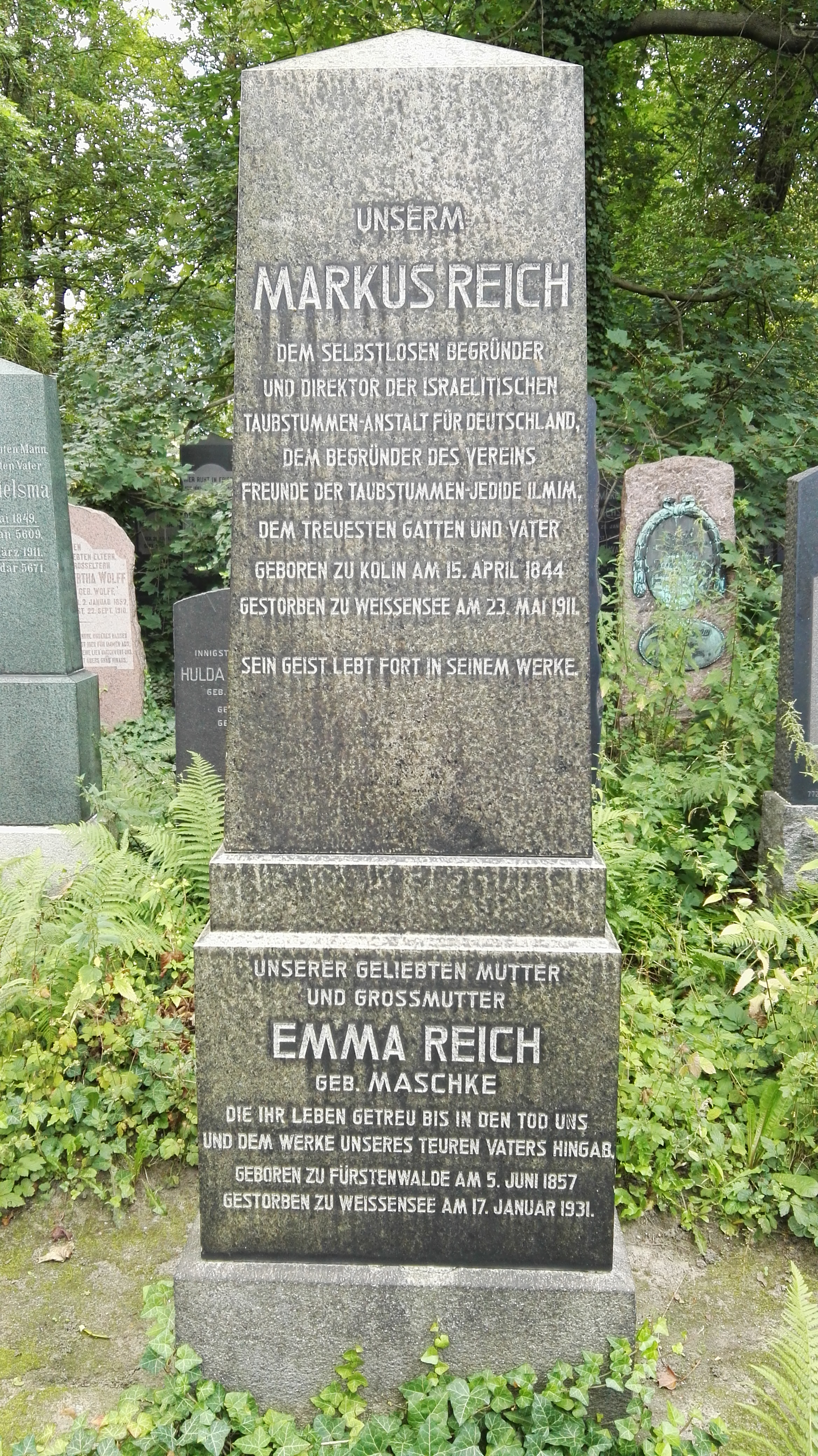
Grave of Markus aad Emma Reich

Markus Reich (born 1844- May 23, 1911, Kolín, Bohemia) was a teacher for the Deaf. He was the founder of Israelite Institution for the Deaf of Germany. He took an interest in Deaf education after meeting a highly educated Deaf man who was able to live independently. This experience, along with his religious values and his discovery that Jewish children were not allowed to attend the Royal Institution for the Deaf, motivated him to establish a school for Deaf Jews. After his death, his son assumed directorship of the Institution.

== Early life and education ==
In 1865, when he was 21 years old, he went to Germany to learn everything that he could to become qualified to be a teacher for the Deaf at the Jewish Teachers Training College and from 1870 to 1871 worked and studied at the Royal Institution for the Deaf in Berlin. Reich also worked as a private tutor; he used his money to purchase books about the Deaf and Deafness. His inspiration and drive came from an acquaintance he had with a Deaf man who “was educated, well brought up, and could speak.” Reich saw how having a good education positively affected his acquaintance's life. He was determined to “make complete, worthy, happy people of the deaf.”

While attending the Royal Institution of the Deaf he noticed that Jewish children were denied admission into the school. That drove him to establish a Jewish institution for Deaf children along with his inspiration that came from two religious sources. The first was from the Chief Rabbi of London Nathan Marcus Adler’s 1864 tract "The Morning and the Evening Sacrifice" which said, “special admonition to support the deaf within the Jewish community” that he based on Isaiah 29:18: “Is it not a duty that falls to all of us to take up these children and to protect them on behalf of God, to educate them so that, as the prophet tells us, everyday the deaf may hear the word of the book.” The second inspiration came from a passage from the Talmud: “Only the ignorant are truly poor.” So in 1873 he made his plan a reality and founded the Israelite Institution for the Deaf of Germany in a small house in Fürstenwalde an der Spree.

Unusually for the time, the Israelite Institution for the Deaf of Germany did not discourage the use of sign language. Reich used sign language both in instruction and in his personal life. Most Deaf institutions during this period used harsh tactics to promote speech, with the ultimate goal of enabling students to assimilate into mainstream society. However, Reich prioritized personal development over the acquisition of spoken language.

During a financial crisis in 1884, Reich formed a support group for his institution called “Friends of the Deaf” (Jedide Ilmin), which included rich Jewish members of the community who came together to provide funding. With all the help, Reich relocated his school to Weissensee in Berlin in 1890. (pg 132) With the school expanding in both students and teachers he decided to remodel the institution in 1911, but he didn't live to see it completed later that year.

Reich was celebrated among the Deaf community in Berlin. After his death, a teacher from the school wrote, “Reich had wholeheartedly entered the world and the being of the deaf. Thus he also used the language of the deaf, sign language, as few hearing persons have done…. Reich fully mastered sign language and he never let himself be prevented from making use of it whenever it was appropriate, including in teaching…. To us teachers, Markus Reich was a true friend and trustworthy counselor.” (pg. 133)

== Family ==
In 1879 he married a woman named Emma, who along with her sister Anna helped educate the deaf children, and with Emma they had a son they named Felix Reich. In 1919 Felix takes over directorship of his father’s school of the Deaf and while in control he authored numerous publications for the Union of German Teachers of the Deaf (pg. 133). Then in 1926 Association of Former Students of the Institution established a publication called The Link.

=== Felix Reich ===
As the son of Emma and Markus Reich, Felix took over the institution in 1919. Felix overcame Germany's postwar inflation and kept the school afloat. In 1931 he reached 59 students.

In either 1938 or 1939 Nazi soldiers arrested Felix in front of the whole school assembly. He was then imprisoned in Sachsenhausen, but was then inexplicably released and returned to the school. He then managed to arrange safe passage for himself and 10 of his school children on the Kindertransport to England. With them was an 11 year old girl who was not a pupil at the school and who was not Jewish: she was the Aryan daughter of one of the teachers at the school.

The 10 Jewish children were sent to the Residential Jewish School for the Deaf in Nightingale Road, Balham, London.

Felix Reich was subsequently interned on the Isle of Man.

After the war he remained in England but did not maintain contact with any of the children he saved.

He died in Manchester in 1964.

== Israelite Institution for the Deaf of Germany ==
The Israelite Institution for the Deaf of Germany, otherwise known as the Israelitische Taubstummenanstalt für Deutschland was founded in 1873. The school was built in a small house in Fürstenwalde an der Spree. Markus had been inspired to create this school with the mission to “preserve and plant in the hearts of the Jewish deaf the religion of their forefathers.” (pg. 132) At the beginning of the school's development, both Reich and the school were very poor. The school started out with just 12 children enrolled. Reich founded “Friends of the Deaf” or “Jedide Ilmin” to support the school. Through the organization, Reich rallied rich members of the community to provide funding to the school. With the found financial security Reich was able to relocate his school to Weissensee near Berlin in 1890. (pg. 132) During this time, Reich was able to “devote himself entirely to the mission of raising and educating his deaf children.” (pg. 132)

In 1911, the school was able to expand. Their staff grew with the addition of 4 male and 2 female teachers. They had 45 students enrolled. During this rebuilding period, Markus passed away. The school was then transferred to Markus's wife, Emma Reich. Then, in 1919, Felix took over the directorship of the institution.

Felix fled Germany in 1939 with a group of students. In 1942, 146 students and staff were murdered by Nazis. No remains of the building still exist. There is a plaque where the school stood commemorating the school and those lost.

== Death ==
He died on May 23, 1911.
