= Esperanto manual alphabet =

Alphabet used to spell in manually coded Esperanto

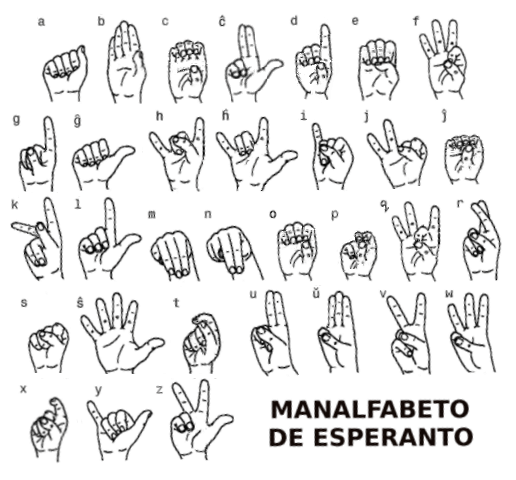
Signuno alphabet

An Esperanto manual alphabet is included as part of the Signuno project for manually coded Esperanto. Signuno is based on the signs of International Sign, but adapted to the grammatical system of Esperanto.

== Letters ==
The letters are all to be signed upright with a straight wrist, and palm outward, so for example the G resembles D, as in the French manual alphabet, although the D fingers are more open (like O) and the index finger is shorter. None of the letters involve motion (again like the static wrist this is to allow greater accessibility for certain disabled groups), so J and Z are distinct from other alphabets: J is like a Cyrillic J; and Z has the form of an ASL 3 (which appears to be unique to Signuno, and may have its origins in Cyrillic letter З (z) being similar in shape to the number 3).

Other differences from the American manual alphabet are:

- B is a flat hand. The thumb does not cross the palm.
- D maintains a round bowl with the thumb and curled fingers, and the lower part of the index finger keeps full contact with the middle finger, so keeping the D hand distinct from G, as also in the French manual alphabet and very conservative American letter forms
- F has the 'okay' handshape with the fingers spread
- H has a shape that recalls a capital Latin H (pinkie and index finger), as in the French and Irish manual alphabets
- J is a variation of I, and visually gives the shape of a J
- P, being upright, is distinguished from K by touching the tips of the fingers and thumb together (like a French P without the motion, hints of Cyrillic, visually like P if it were to be seen from the side)
- Q, which does not occur in Esperanto, is the shape of an ASL 8 sign and of an Irish K (fingers spread, hints of K+V)
- T has its international form, as in the Irish manual alphabet and across Asia, rather than the fig sign of ASL.

The diacritic letters Ĉ, Ĝ, Ĥ, Ĵ, Ŝ, Ŭ are sometimes derived from their base letters:

- Ĉ is as the handshape used by some Spanish language manual alphabets for CH (extending the thumb of the U hand)
- Ĝ by switching the extended finger of the G hand from the index finger to the thumb (like a French A or a thumb for hitchhiking)
- Ĥ by extending the thumb of the H hand (like the ASL slang 'I love you' sign, or like H in French manual alphabet) (Ĥ is rarely used)
- Ĵ is as Ж/Ž in the Russian manual alphabet (which has the same sound as Esperanto Ĵ)
- Ŝ by opening the S hand into a '5' handshape, like SCH in the German manual alphabet
- Ŭ is a variation of U, and is signed as a W hand but with the three fingers together, as in a scout salute (Ŭ corresponds to W in Esperanto).

== Digits ==
Unlike in Gestuno, Signuno digits are all made on a single hand. For 1 to 4, the fingers are extended from the index to the pinkie. Thus Signuno '3' looks like an ASL '6'. 5 is the international (and ASL) '5' hand. For 6 to 9, the fingers are extended from the pinkie to the thumb, skipping the middle finger so that 8 is the ASL '8'. Apart from facing inwards or (in the case of 0 and 10) to the side rather than outward as the letters do, they thus have the shapes of the Signuno letters O (0), G (1), V (2), W (3), [ASL 4] (4), Ŝ [ASL 5] (5), I (6), J (7), Q [ASL 8] (8), [ASL handshape for 'feel'] (9).

Powers of ten have the palm pointing to the side. 10 is signed as the Roman numeral X. As in ASL, 100 and 1000 are signed as the Roman numerals C and M.

For hours and months, there are additional sign for 11 and 12, which have the shapes of the letters Ĝ (11) and L (12) but turned so the palm faces the signer.

When working in hexadecimal, the pattern can be extended to 13 and 14 (i.e., 13 in hex is a turned Z hand), while 15 (hexadecimal 'F') is a turned F hand.

== Gallery ==
Images and precise definitions for the letters and number can be found in the Signuno documentation.
