= Chilean manual alphabet =

Alphabet used in Chilean Sign Language

The Chilean manual alphabet is used by the Chilean deaf community to sign Spanish words and is incorporated into Chilean Sign Language. It is a one-handed alphabet and very similar to the American manual alphabet, as well as the French, Brazilian and Spanish ones.

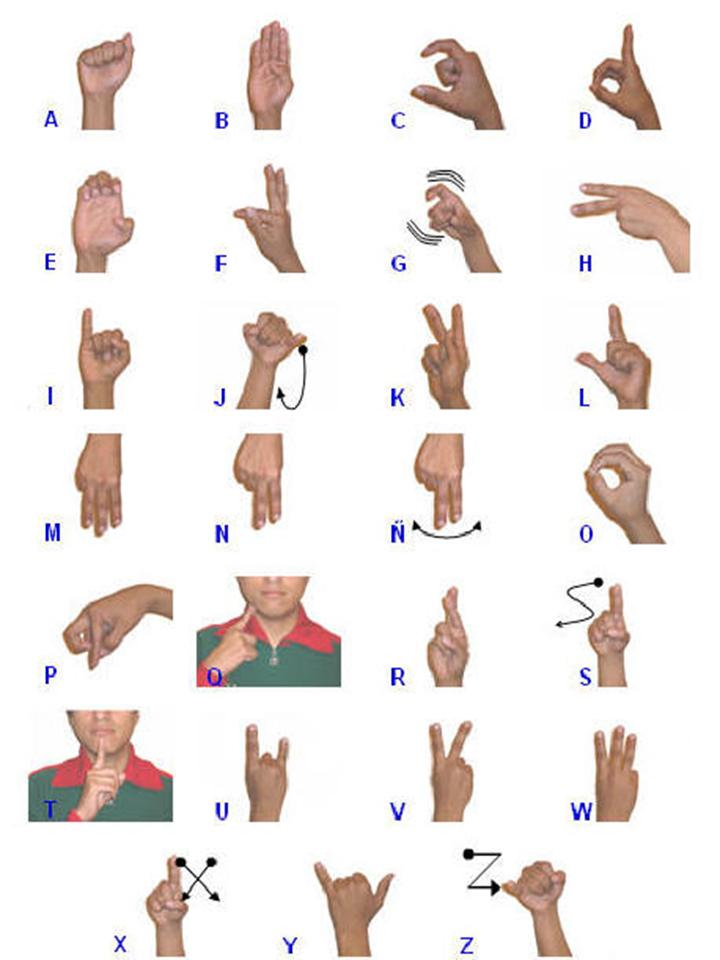
