= International Sign =

Sign language, used particularly at international meetings

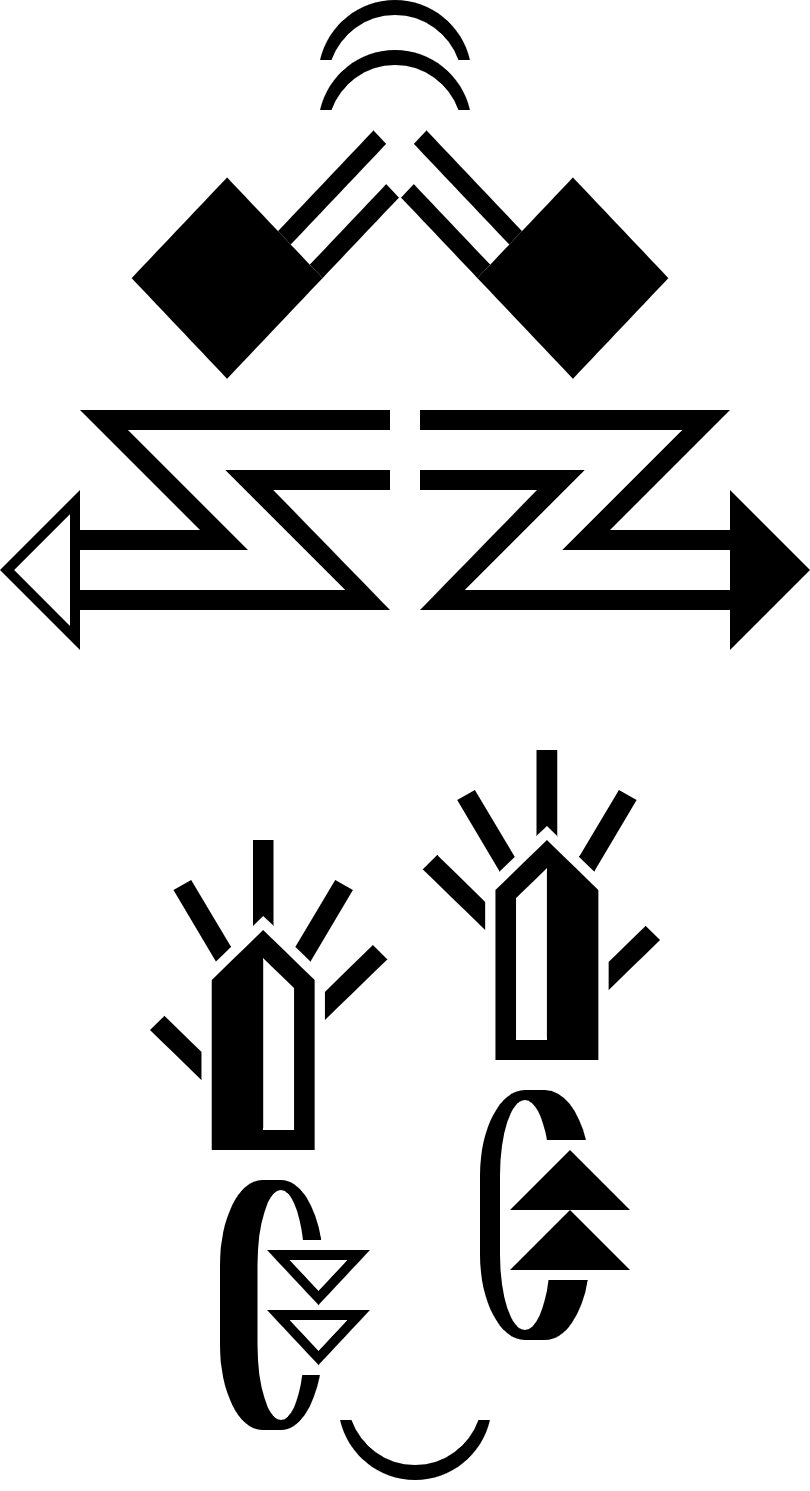
- Region: Contact between sign languages, international contact between deaf people
- Language family: pidgin

Language codes
- ISO 639-3: ils
- Glottolog: inte1259

International Sign (IS) is a pidgin sign language which is used in a variety of different contexts, particularly as an international auxiliary language at meetings such as the World Federation of the Deaf (WFD) congress, in some European Union settings, at some UN conferences, as well as a number of academic conferences, at events such as the Deaflympics, the Miss & Mister Deaf World, and Eurovision, and informally when travelling and socialising.

Linguists do not agree on what the term International Sign means precisely, and empirically derived dictionaries are lacking.

== Naming ==
While the more commonly used term is International Sign, it is sometimes referred to as Gestuno, or International Sign Pidgin and International Gesture (IG). International Sign (IS) is a term used by the World Federation of the Deaf (WFD) and other international organisations.

== History ==
Deaf people in the Western and Middle Eastern world have gathered together using sign language for 2,000 years. When Deaf people from different sign language backgrounds get together, a variety of sign language arises from this contact, whether it is in an informal personal context or in a formal international context. Deaf people have therefore used a kind of auxiliary gestural system for international communication at sporting or cultural events since the early 19th century. The need to standardise an international sign system was discussed at the first World Deaf Congress in 1951, when the WFD was formed. In the following years, a pidgin developed as the delegates from different language backgrounds communicated with each other, and in 1973, a WFD committee ("the Commission of Unification of Signs") published a standardized vocabulary. Iosif Florianovich Geilman served as a deputy chairman of the World Federation of the Deaf and was a member of the international commission that compiled and edited the Gestuno dictionary. They selected "naturally spontaneous and easy signs in common use by deaf people of different countries" to make the language easy to learn. A book published by the commission in 1975, Gestuno: International Sign Language of the Deaf, contains a vocabulary list of 1,470 signs. The name Gestuno was chosen, referencing gesture and oneness.

However, when Gestuno was first used at the WFD congress in Bulgaria in 1976, it was incomprehensible to deaf participants. Subsequently, it was developed informally by deaf and hearing interpreters, and came to include more grammar, especially linguistic features that are thought to be universal among sign languages, such as role shifting, movement repetitions, the use of signing space, and classifiers. Additionally, Gestuno was phased out in favor of IS which prioritized mutually intelligible signs, iconic signs, and loan signs from various sign languages.

The first training course in Gestuno was conducted in Copenhagen in 1977 to prepare interpreters for the 5th World Conference on Deafness. Sponsored by the Danish Association of the Deaf and the University of Copenhagen, the course was designed by Robert M. Ingram and taught by Betty L. Ingram, two American interpreters of deaf parents.

The name Gestuno has fallen out of use, and the phrase International Sign is now more commonly used in English to identify this variety of sign. This may be because current IS has little in common with the signs published under the name Gestuno.

== Description ==
International Sign has been described as a highly variable type of signed communication used between two signers who lack a common sign language. Most experts do not technically consider IS to be a full language, but rather a form of communication that arises on the spot. It is characterized by a focus on iconic or pantomimic structures; IS signers may also point to nearby objects. While some degree of standardization takes place at events such WFD and the European Union of the Deaf, it is limited to vocabulary, not grammar.

There is no consensus on what International Sign is exactly. It may either refer to the way strangers sign with each other when they lack a common sign language, or it can refer to a conventionalized form used by a group of people with regular contact. The use of the term International Sign might also lead to the misconception that it is a standardized form of communication.

Deaf people typically know only one sign language. Signers from differing countries may use IS spontaneously with each other, with relative success. This communicative success is linked to various factors. First, people who sign in IS have a certain amount of shared contextual knowledge. Secondly, signers may take advantage of shared knowledge of a spoken language, such as English. Thirdly, communication is made easier by the use of iconic signs and pantomime.

== Vocabulary ==
The lexicon of International Sign is made by negotiation between signers. IS signers reportedly use a set of signs from their own national sign language mixed with highly iconic signs that can be understood by a large audience. Many, not to say most, signs are taken from American Sign Language during the past 30 years. In 1973, a committee created and standardized a system of international signs. They tried to choose the most understandable signs from diverse sign languages to make the language easy to learn for not only the Deaf but for both interim management and an everyday observer. IS interpreter Bill Moody noted in a 1994 paper that the vocabulary used in conference settings is largely derived from the sign languages of the Western world and is less comprehensible to those from African or Asian sign language backgrounds. A 1999 study by Bencie Woll suggested that IS signers often use a large amount of vocabulary from their native language, choosing sign variants that would be more easily understood by a foreigner. In contrast, Rachel Rosenstock notes that the vocabulary exhibited in her study of International Sign was largely made up of highly iconic signs common to many sign languages:

Over 60% of the signs occurred in the same form in more than eight SLs as well as in IS. This suggests that the majority of IS signs are not signs borrowed from a specific SL, as other studies found, but rather are common to many natural SLs. Only 2% of IS signs were found to be unique to IS. The remaining 38% were borrowed (or "loan") signs that could be traced back to one SL or a group of related SLs.

International Sign has a simplified lexicon. In IS for example, the English who, what, and how are all translated simply to what. Another example of this simplified lexicon is the location of the sign itself. IS will use movements on the chest to indicate feeling signs, and signs near the head will indicate cognitive activity.

The sign language app and website Spread the Sign offers an International Sign dictionary for International Sign, displaying 718 videos in IS, alongside many more videos in other sign languages. It is run by the European Sign Language Center, an NGO headquartered in Örebro, Sweden.

=== Manual alphabet ===
The manual alphabet of IS belongs to the French family of manual alphabets, specifically in a subgroup around to the modern American manual alphabet. However, some letters differ in a few finger positions to the American alphabet.

IS numbers larger than five are, unlike in ASL, performed by two hands.

== Grammar ==
Very little is known about the grammar of IS. It tends to use fewer mouthings and often has a larger signing space. The use of mouth gestures for adverbials is emphasized.

People communicating in IS tend to make heavy use of:

1. role play,
2. index and reference locations in the signing space in front of the signer, on the head and trunk, and on the non-dominant hand,
3. different movement repetitions,
4. size and shape delineation techniques using handshapes and extensions of movements of the hands (size and size specifiers, or SASS), and
5. a feature common to most sign languages: an extensive formal system of classifiers used in verbs/predicates (classifiers are handshapes used to describe things, handle objects, and represent a few semantic classes that are regarded by IS signers to be widespread in sign languages, helping them to overcome linguistic barriers).

It has been noted that signers are generally better at interlingual communication than non-signers, even using a spoken lingua franca.

A paper presented in 1994 suggested that IS signers "combine a relatively rich and structured grammar with a severely impoverished lexicon". Supalla and Webb (1995) describe IS as a kind of a pidgin, but conclude that it is "more complex than a typical pidgin and indeed is more like that of a full sign language".

== Recent studies of International Sign ==
Simplification of signs in IS can vary between interpreters (one can choose a simplification over a much longer explanation), and because of this, certain information can be lost in translation. Because sign language relies heavily on local influences, many Deaf people do not understand each other's signs. Furthermore, cultural differences in signs can vary even within borders. In these cases, many Deaf people revert to fingerspelling and gestures or mime, which has its own variations based on similar sign language properties.

The World Federation of the Deaf (WFD) has raised concern about the issues with simplification and standardization, and that it limits a sign to a single meaning or word, thus losing all natural forms of the initial meaning.

An ethnographic study notes that there is some controversy among deaf people about how accessible IS is to deaf people from different places; it also observes that many deaf people are nevertheless highly motivated to do the work of communicating across linguistic and other differences.

== Examples ==
- Spreadthesign International Sign dictionary
- WFD homepage
- Digital version of Gestuno: International Sign Language of the Deaf/Langage Gestuel International des Sourds — contains original IS signs (many now outdated) in photograph form
- Short International Sign Language Dictionary web archive
- EU sample dictionary of IS (sematos)
- European Union on the Deaf (EUD) – Information on IS
- Signs2Cross Project – Information on International Sign
- Mobile Deaf "This is IS" documentaries - They have produced 6 different documentaries about International Sign

== See also ==
- Lingua franca
- List of sign languages
- Sign language
- World Federation of the Deaf
- Ted Supalla
- Esperanto manual alphabet (Signuno alphabet)

== Bibliography ==
- McKee R., Napier J. (2002) "Interpreting in International Sign Pidgin: an analysis." Journal of Sign Language Linguistics 5(1).
- Allsop, Lorna; Woll, Bencie; Brauti, John Martin (1995). International sign: The creation of an international deaf community and sign language. In: Bos, Heleen F. and Schermer, Gertrude M. (eds): "Sign Language Research 1994: Proceedings of the Fourth European Congress on Sign Language Research, Munich, September 1–3, 1994." (International Studies on Sign Language and Communication of the Deaf; 29) Hamburg : Signum (1995) – pp. 171–188
- Webb, Rebecca and Supalla, Ted, (1994). Negation in international sign. In: Ahlgren, Inger / Bergman, Brita / Brennan, Mary (eds): Perspectives on sign language structure: Papers from the Fifth International Symposium on Sign Language Research. Vol. 1; Held in Salamanca, Spain, 25–30 May 1992. Durham : isla (1994) – pp. 173–186
- Moody, Bill (1987). "International gesture". In Van Cleve, John V. (ed.). Gallaudet Encyclopedia of Deaf People and Deafness. Vol. 3. New York: McGraw-Hill Book Company. ISBN 9780070792296. OCLC 13821696.
- Rubino, F., Hayhurst, A., and Guejlman, J. (1975). Gestuno. International sign language of the deaf. (revised and expanded). Carlisle: British Deaf Association [for] the World Federation of the Deaf.
- Magarotto, Cesare, (1974). Towards an International Language of Gestures. (Unesco Courier)
