= Disability in Chile =

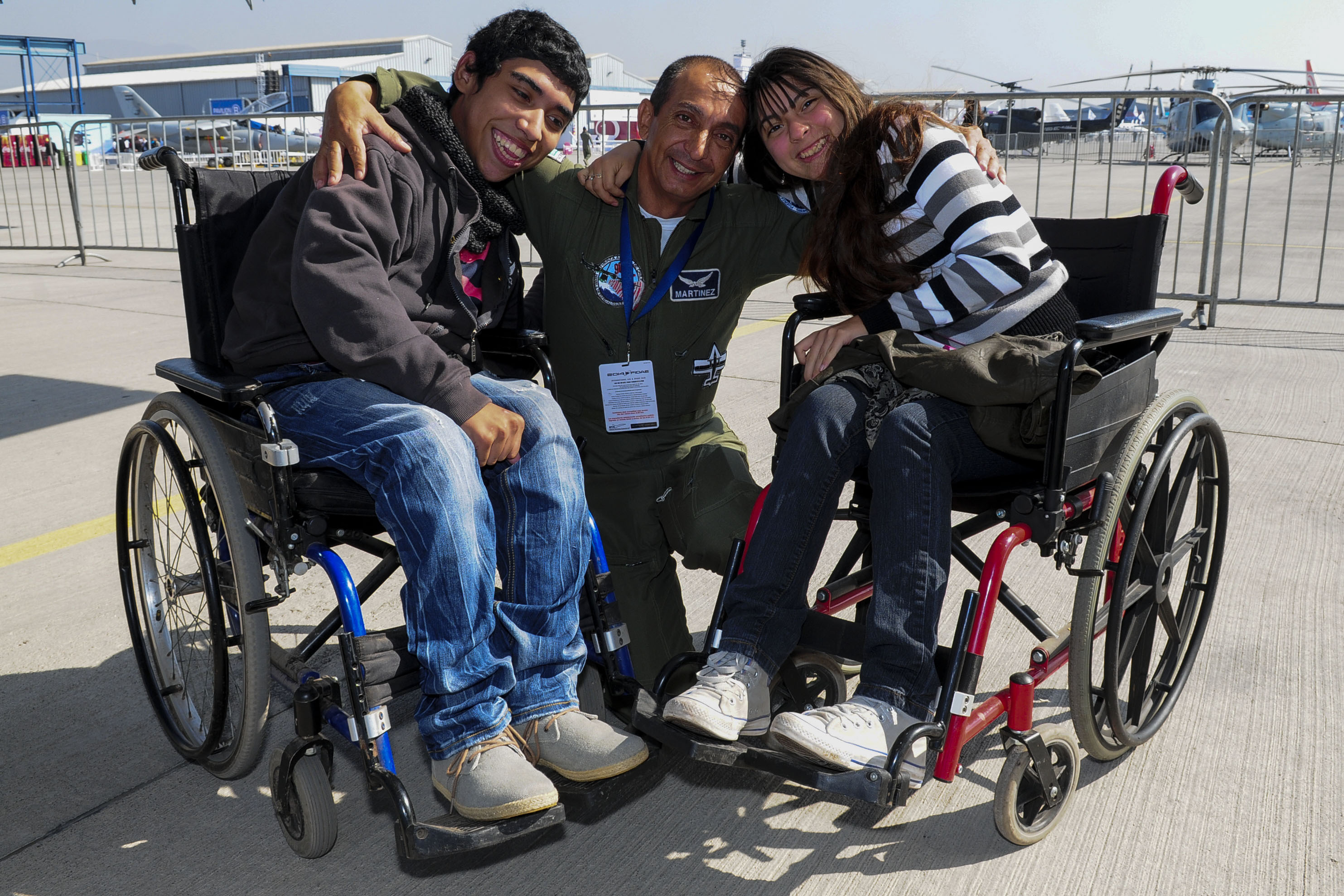
Chilean pilot and two children at the 2014 FIDAE Air Show in Santiago.

There are around 2,800,000 people with a disability in Chile. For the most part, citizens of Chile largely have a positive view of people with disabilities, though there is still discrimination in employment and other areas based on misconceptions about disability. The country largely uses a social model of disability in its approach to inclusive policies and laws regarding people with disability. Chile ratified the Convention on the Rights of Persons with Disability in 2008 and has passed several laws which are intended to provide rights and inclusion for people with disabilities. In 2010, Chile created the National Disability Service (Servicio Nacional de la Discapacidad SENADIS) in order to coordinate policies regarding people with disabilities. Accessibility in Santiago is generally very good and the national parks of Chile also work to provide accessibility in natural areas owned by the state.

== Demographics ==
The National Disability Study carried out in 2015 by the Chilean government, found that 16.7 percent of the population, around 2,800,000 people in Chile have a disability of some type. Around 8.3 percent of Chileans have a severe disability with 11.7 percent have low to medium levels of disability. An earlier census, in 2012, found that slightly more women (54.3%) than men (46.6%) had a disability. Also in 2012, the National Foundation for People with Disabilities (FND) found that the most common type of disability in Chile is a sensory disability. The 2017 National Population Census did not include any questions about disability.

Chile has a high level of socioeconomic inequality and people with disabilities are more likely to live in poverty. The Department of Social Development found that "seven out of ten people with disabilities belong to the three poorest quintiles of population." Before the 2018 Labor Inclusion Law, around 12,910 workers with a disability had been hired in the private sector. According to the 2015 National Disability Study, only 39.3 percent of people with disabilities are employed and around 32 percent of these receive lower wages.

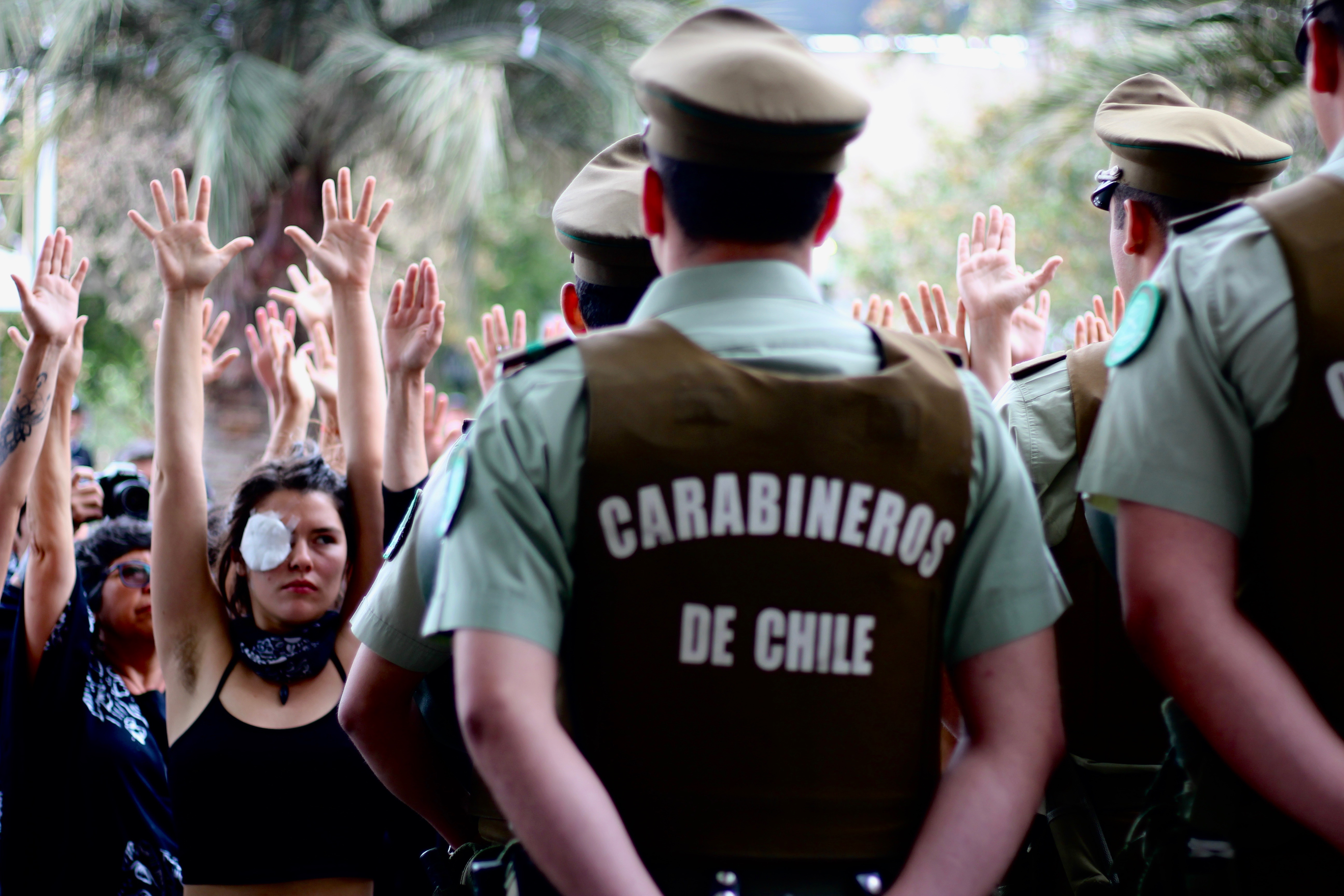
Protester in Chile with damaged eye, November 2, 2019.

During 2019 protests in Chile, more than 200 people involved in the demonstrations received eye injuries due to the use of pellets or rubber bullets by state security agents (Carabineros) on demonstrators. Of these, 50 needed prosthetic eyes and many became blind. On average, those who sustained eye trauma were around 30 years old. On November 7, 2019, a health emergency was declared by health associations due to the eye injuries.

== Policy ==
Chile began to use a social model of disability starting in 1990. This included promoting equal rights for people with disabilities and rights-based programs that advocated for inclusion in the community. In 2010, the National Disability Service (Servicio Nacional de la Discapacidad SENADIS) was created to ensure inclusion of people with disability in public policy and ensure that rights of people with disabilities are protected by law. However, SENADIS is not well funded. The current director of SENADIS is María Ximena Rivas. Individuals wishing to access services for people with disabilities must be certified by the Preventive Medicine and Disability Commission (Comisiones de Medicina Preventiva e Invalidez COMPIN).

There are two types of pensions in Chile. The Invalidity Pension (Pensión de Invalidez PI) is part of the private pension system and can be accessed by people who are unable to work. The poorest individuals can apply for the Basic Solidarity Pension of Invalidity (Pensión Básica Solidaria de Invalidez PBSI). Those who have not contributed to the Social Security system can apply for disability pensions. As of 2015, the pensions only cover around 23 percent of people with disability in Chile.

=== Non-governmental organizations ===
The oldest national deaf association in South America was formed in Chile around 1900 in Santiago, later becoming the Chilean Society of Deaf and Dumb in 1913. In October 1929, they reorganized under the name Asociación de Sordos de Chile (Chilean Association of the Deaf ASOCH).

A yearly telethon known as Teletón, is a way to raise money for children with disabilities. Teletón started in 1978 and has remained popular over time. It is similar to the Jerry Lewis telethons in the United States.

=== Legislation ===
In 1990, Decree 490 provided the inclusion of students with special needs in the general classroom. The Social Integration of Persons with Disabilities (Law 19.284) was enacted in 1993. This law used a medical model of disability.

Chile signed the Convention on the Rights of Persons with Disability in 2007 and ratified it in 2008.

Law N. 20.255 was passed in 2008 and replaces the Assistance Pension Program (Pensiones Asisteniales PASIS) with the Basic Solidarity Pension of Invalidity (Pensión Básica Solidaria de Invalidez PBSI). Decree N°170 in 2009 sets up criteria for measuring the eligibility of financial support for students with special needs.

Law 20.422, the "Law setting the rules and standards on equality of opportunities and social inclusion of people with disabilities" was enacted in February 2010. The law defines people with disability as those who have one or more types of "deficiency," whether physical, mental or sensory which restricts their "full and effective participation in society." The law also created the National Disability Service (Servicio Nacional de la Discapacidad SENADIS). Sign language was mentioned in this law for the first time in Chile's legal history, recognizing sign language "as the natural means of communication of the Deaf community." The law also directs that television broadcasters must provide means for individuals to be able to access subtitles and sign language interpretation for programming. Law 20.422 also provides equal opportunity and social inclusion for people with disabilities. The same law also is intended to protect people with disabilities from being discriminated against in employment.

Through Law 20.602, 2012 enacted in August 2012, Chilean Sign Language was recognized as an official language.

Law N. 21.015 was enacted in May 2017 and modifies some of Law 20.422, especially in regards to employing people with disabilities. Starting in 2018, any company in Chile with 100 or more employees must have a quota of 1% of their workforce made up of people with disabilities. In addition, discrimination of people with disabilities in the workplace is not allowed.

=== Education ===
Special education in Chile aids children with various types of disability. Children can be aided in class or on site at hospitals. According to a 2017 OECD report, Chile is making a "clear effort to target resources to vulnerable students," including students with a disability. The government has worked to improve special education, especially through the School Integration Programme (PIE). However, there is still a "short supply" of educational provisions for students with permanent disabilities and a low level of integration of students with special needs into regular classrooms. Many teachers in mainstream schools do not have the necessary training to work with students with special needs. In addition, schools do not always appropriately or correctly diagnose the needs of students with disabilities, meaning that students may not have the correct resources. Special education teachers, as of 2019, made less money than other types of teachers.

The Center of Sign Language Studies (CELENSE) was formed in 1987 in order to teach Chilean Sign Language (LSCh) to the Deaf community. Deaf students can have access to interpreters of LSCh in the classroom.

As of 2016, only 46.9 percent of people with disability have completed only a basic level of education. A study in 2005 found that only 6.6 percent of young people with a disability go on to university and fewer graduate.

== Accessibility ==
The National Tourism Service (SERNATUR) and the National Disabilities Service (SENADIS) of Chile have created a "comprehensive guide" to traveling in the country with a disability. The National System of State Protected Wild Areas (Sistema Nacional de Áreas Silvestres Protegidas del Estado SNASPE) have accessible services in their national parks, reserves and national monuments. SNASPE began voluntarily improving these natural areas for accessibility in the early 2000s.

Santiago is more accessible than other cities in Latin America. The first street art for blind people, "Manos a la pared," was unveiled in 2018 in the city. Newer buses and metro stations in Santiago are accessible to people in wheelchairs and with physical disabilities. Improvements to the public transportation in other cities has lagged behind Santiago. However, both Santiago and Concepción have traffic lights and street crossing locations with sound and tactile paving.

In the 1990s the Club Real de Sordos (CRESOR) started requesting Chilean Sign Language (LSCh) interpreters for news broadcasts. The Deaf community filed lawsuits in order to secure their rights to access to information on television. Members of the Deaf community also protested for their rights. Law 20.422 was passed and specifies that emergency information must be broadcast on television with a sign language interpreter or with closed captions.

People with disabilities have more difficulty accessing health services in Chile, whether it's getting to the facility, or paying for treatment. Despite Chile having universal health care, people with disabilities still have problems accessing care. Patients report that they feel as though they are considered "low-priority." Women also have more trouble accessing health care than do men in Chile.

Chile, working with the Special Olympics, hosted the first inclusive eSports tournament in Latin America on July 30, 2020.

== Cultural attitudes ==
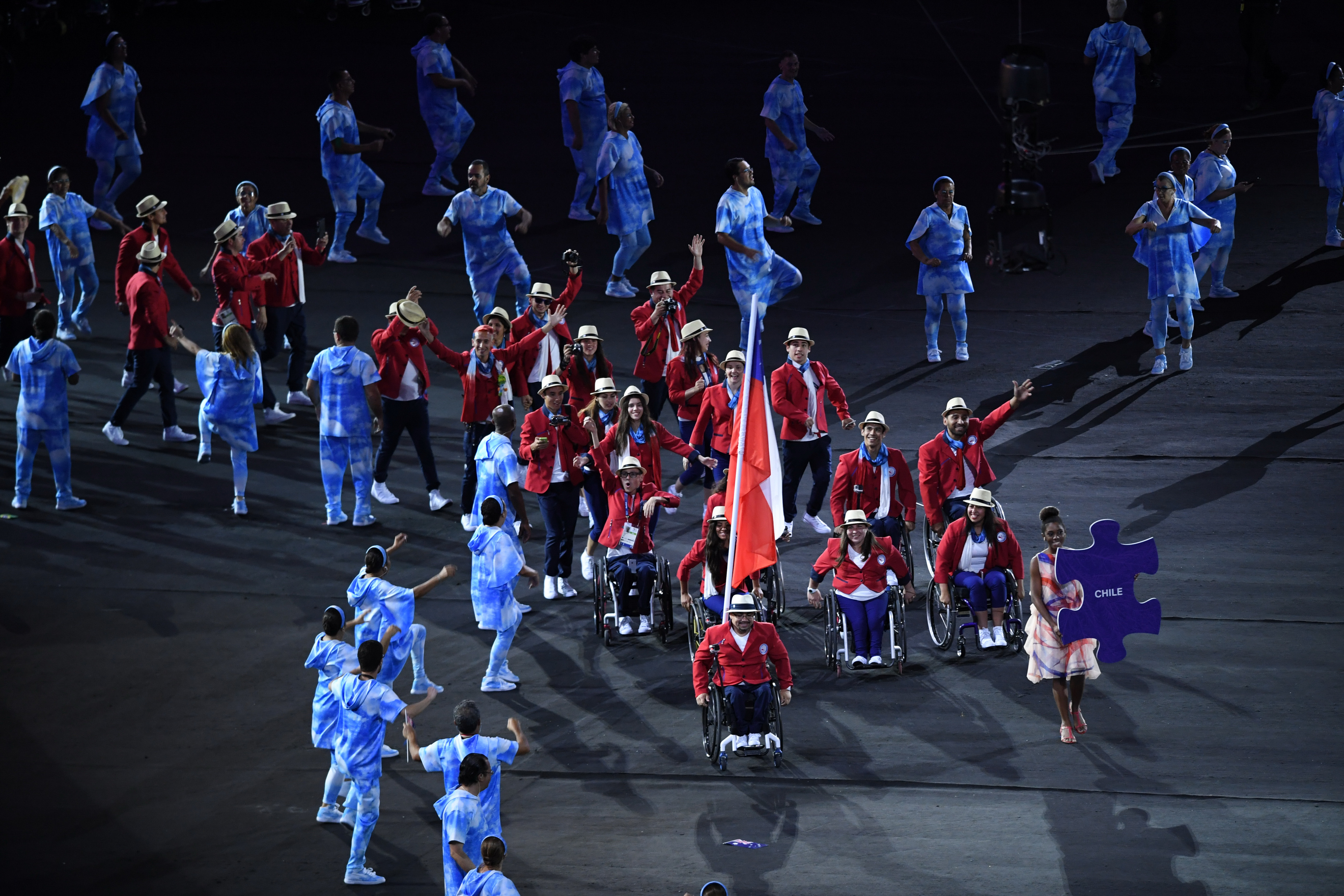
Chile at the 2016 Paralympics.

There has been a larger discussion about the rights of people with disabilities in Chile in recent years. Chile has a largely positive attitude towards people with disabilities.

However, there are still negative attitudes towards people with disabilities in some sectors. For example, some employers make negative assumptions about employees with disabilities, assuming they will be more likely to have accidents or take sick days than non-disabled employees. Individuals have reported discrimination in hiring practices. Labor rights are not effectively communicated, so individuals also do not always know if their own rights are being violated in hiring or in the workplace. Around 24 percent of people with intellectual disabilities have reported discrimination of some sort against them.

Some individuals who are permanently physically disabled survive through begging. In Chile, they are known as "honest beggars" or by the slang word, macheteo.

== See also ==
- Chile at the Paralympics
