= Catalan manual alphabet =

Alphabet used in Catalan Sign Language

External image
- Catalan manual alphabet

The Catalan manual alphabet is used in Catalan Sign Language but was not officially recognized as one of Catalonia's official languages until 3 June 2010 when Law 17/2010 of the Catalan sign language (LSC) was approved by the government. The Catalan manual alphabet is single-handed and is extremely similar to the Spanish manual alphabet. As a result, people who use Spanish Sign Language can understand approximately up to 80% of the Catalan sign language.
