= Nepali manual alphabet =

The Nepali manual alphabet is fingerspelling devised for the Nepali alphabet-syllabary, Devanagari, to go with Nepalese Sign Language. It was developed by the Kathmandu Association of the Deaf (KAD), with support from UNICEF. Based loosely on the formulations in the American manual alphabet and International manual alphabet, only the forms for the letters अ (from “a”), ब (from “b”), म (from “m”), and र (from “r”) can be said to derive directly from their Latin alphabet equivalent. All other letter finger-shapes are indigenous.
