= Fingerspelling =

Form of communication using one or both hands

American manual alphabet, as used in American Sign Language

Fingerspelling (or dactylology) is the representation of the letters of a writing system, and sometimes numeral systems, using only the hands. These manual alphabets (also known as finger alphabets or hand alphabets) have often been used in deaf education and have subsequently been adopted as a distinct part of a number of sign languages. There are about forty manual alphabets around the world. Historically, manual alphabets have had a number of additional applications—including use as ciphers, as mnemonics and in silent religious settings.

== Forms of manual alphabets ==
As with other forms of manual communication, fingerspelling can be comprehended visually or tactually. The simplest visual form of fingerspelling is tracing the shape of letters in the air and the simplest tactual form is tracing them on the hand. Fingerspelling can be one-handed such as in American Sign Language, French Sign Language and Irish Sign Language, or it can be two-handed such as in British Sign Language.

== Fingerspelling in sign languages ==
Fingerspelling has been introduced into certain sign languages by educators and as such has some structural properties that are unlike the visually motivated and multi-layered signs that are typical in deaf sign languages. In many ways fingerspelling serves as a bridge between the sign language and the oral language that surrounds it.

Fingerspelling is used in different sign languages and registers for different purposes. It may be used to represent words from an oral language that have no sign equivalent or for emphasis or clarification or when teaching or learning a sign language.

In American Sign Language (ASL) more lexical items are fingerspelled in casual conversation than in formal or narrative signing. Different sign language speech communities use fingerspelling to a greater or lesser degree. At the high end of the scale fingerspelling makes up about 8.7% of casual signing in ASL and 10% of casual signing in Auslan. The proportion is higher in older signers. Across the Tasman Sea only 2.5% of the corpus of New Zealand Sign Language was found to be fingerspelling. Fingerspelling did not become a part of NZSL until the 1980s. Before that words could be spelled or initialized by tracing letters in the air. Fingerspelling does not seem to be used much in the sign languages of Eastern Europe except in schools, and Italian Sign Language is also said to use very little fingerspelling, and mainly for foreign words. Sign languages that make no use of fingerspelling at all include Kata Kolok and Ban Khor Sign Language.

The speed and clarity of fingerspelling also vary among different signing communities. In Italian Sign Language fingerspelled words are produced relatively slowly and clearly, whereas fingerspelling in standard British Sign Language (BSL) is often rapid so that the individual letters become difficult to distinguish and the word is grasped from the overall hand movement. Most of the letters of the BSL alphabet are produced with two hands but when one hand is occupied the dominant hand may fingerspell onto an imaginary subordinate hand and the word can be recognized by the movement. As with written words, the first and last letters and the length of the word are the most significant factors for recognition.

When people fluent in sign language read fingerspelling they do not usually look at the signer's hand(s) but maintain eye contact, as is normal for sign language. People who are learning fingerspelling often find it impossible to understand it using just their peripheral vision and must look straight at the hand of someone who is fingerspelling. Often they must also ask the signer to fingerspell slowly. It frequently takes years of expressive and receptive practice to become skilled with fingerspelling.

== Families of manual alphabets in sign languages ==
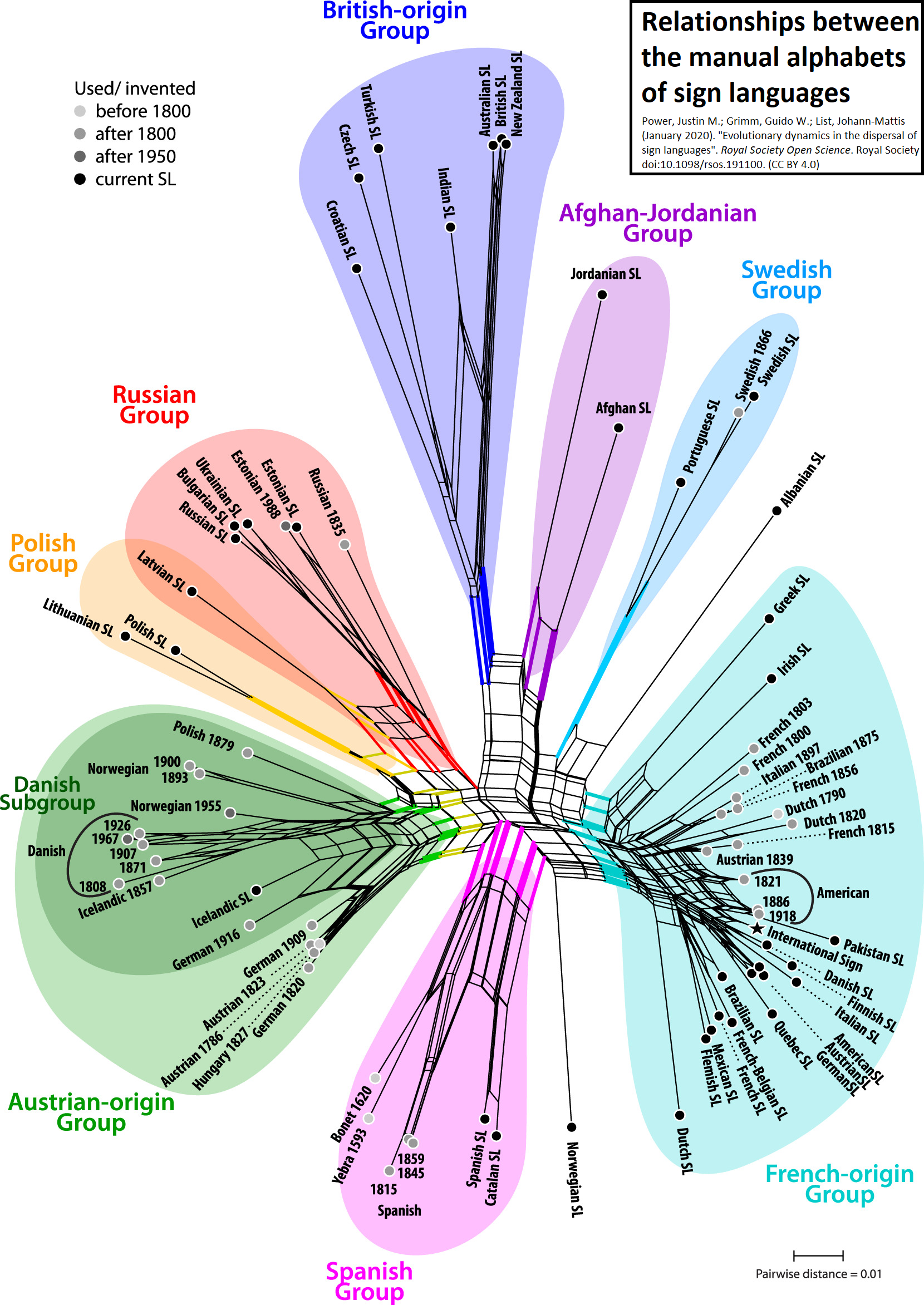
Relationships between the manual alphabets of sign languages, expressed as a phylogenetic network

Power et al. (2020) conducted a large-scale data study into the evolution and contemporary character of 76 current and defunct manual alphabets (MAs) of sign languages, postulating the existence of eight groups: an Afghan–Jordanian Group, an Austrian-origin Group (with a Danish Subgroup), a British-origin Group, a French-origin Group, a Polish Group, a Russian Group, a Spanish Group, and a Swedish Group. Notably, several defunct versions of German, Austrian, Hungarian and Danish manual alphabets were part of the Austrian-origin group, while the current MAs of these sign languages are closely related to the French, American, International Sign and other MAs in the French-origin Group. Latvian Sign Language's MA dangled somewhere between the Polish and Russian Groups, Finnish Sign Language (which belongs to the Swedish Sign Language family) had a French-origin MA, while Indo-Pakistani Sign Language (whose lexicon and grammar have independent origins) currently used a two-handed manual alphabet of British origin.

Yoel (2009) demonstrated that American Sign Language is influencing the lexicon and grammar of Maritime Sign Language in various ways, including the fact that the original BANZSL two-handed manual alphabet is no longer used in the Maritimes and has been replaced by the one-handed American manual alphabet, which has been influencing lexicalisation. Although all participants in her survey had learnt and could still produce the BANZSL fingerspelling, they had difficulty doing so, and all participants indicated that it had been a long time since they last used it.

=== One-handed ===
Dutch manual alphabet

Two families of manual alphabets are used for representing the Latin alphabet in the modern world. The more common of the two is mostly produced on one hand and can be traced back to alphabetic signs used in Europe from at least the early 15th century.

Some manual representations of non-Roman scripts such as Chinese, Japanese, Devanagari (e.g. the Nepali manual alphabet), Hebrew, Greek, Thai and Russian alphabets are based to some extent on the one-handed Latin alphabet described above. In some cases, however, the 'basis' is more theory than practice. Thus, for example, in the Japanese manual syllabary only the five vowels (ア /a/, イ /i/, ウ /u/, エ /e/, オ /o/) and the Ca (consonant plus "a' vowel) letters (カ /ka/, サ /sa/, ナ /na/, ハ /ha/, マ /ma/, ヤ /ya/, ラ /ra/, ワ /wa/, but notably not タ /ta/, which would resemble a somewhat rude gesture) derive from the American manual alphabet. In the Nepali Sign Language only four 'letters' derive from the American manual alphabet: अ /a/, ब /b/, म /m/, and र /r/).

The Yugoslav manual alphabet represents characters from the Serbian Cyrillic alphabet as well as Gaj's Latin alphabet.

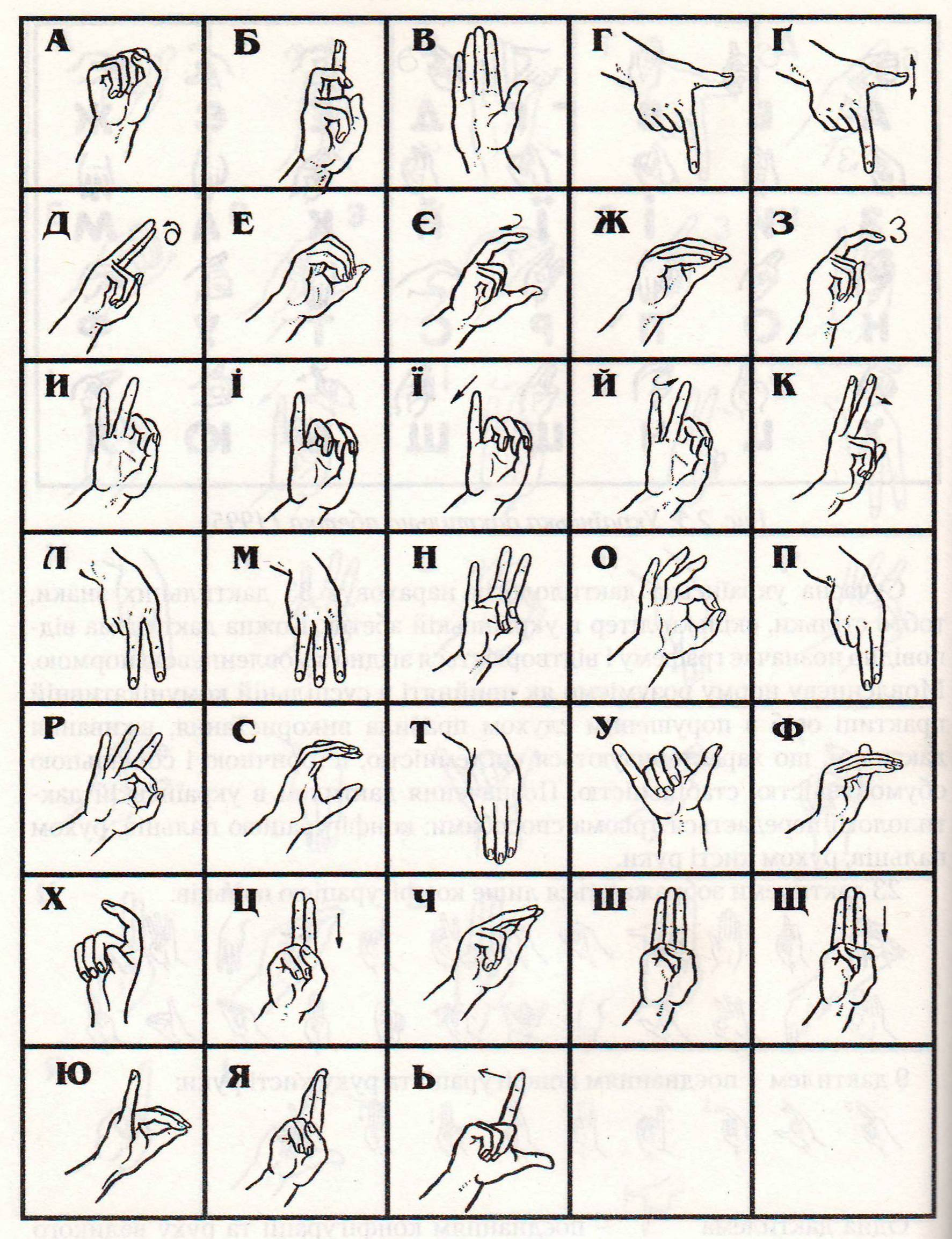
Ukrainian manual alphabet

Manual alphabets based on the Arabic alphabet, the Ethiopian Ge'ez script and the Korean Hangul script use handshapes that are more or less iconic representations of the characters in the writing system.

=== Two-handed ===
British Sign Language uses a two-handed alphabet.

Two-handed manual alphabets are used by a number of deaf communities; one such alphabet is shared by users of British Sign Language, Auslan and New Zealand Sign Language (collectively known as the BANZSL language family) and another is used in Turkish Sign Language. Some of the letters are represented by iconic shapes and in the BANZSL languages the vowels are represented by pointing to the fingertips.

Letters are formed by a dominant hand, which is on top of or alongside the other hand at the point of contact, and a subordinate hand, which uses either the same or a simpler handshape as the dominant hand. Either the left or right hand can be dominant. In a modified tactile form used by deafblind people the signer's hand acts as the dominant hand and the receiver's hand becomes the subordinate hand.

Some signs, such as the sign commonly used for the letter C, may be one-handed.

== History of manual alphabets ==
=== Latin manual alphabet ===
Some writers have suggested that the body and hands were used to represent alphabets in Greek, Roman, Egyptian and Assyrian antiquity. Certainly, "finger calculus" systems were widespread, and capable of representing numbers up to 1024; they are still in use today in parts of the Middle East. The practice of substituting letters for numbers and vice versa, known as gematria, was also common, and it is possible that the two practices were combined to produce a finger calculus alphabet. The earliest known manual alphabet, described by the Benedictine monk Bede in 8th century Northumbria, did just that. While the usual purpose of the Latin and Greek finger alphabets described by Bede is unknown, they were unlikely to have been used by deaf people for communication — even though Bede lost his own hearing later in life. Historian Lois Bragg concludes that these alphabets were "only a bookish game."

1494 illustration of a finger alphabet and counting system originally described by Bede in 710. The Greek alphabet is represented, with three additional letters making a total of 27, by the first three columns of numbers. The first two columns are produced on the left hand, and the next two columns on the right. Luca Pacioli modified the finger alphabet to the form shown above, where the handshapes for 1 and 10 on the left hand correspond to the 100s and 1000s on the right.

Beginning with R. A. S. Macalister in 1938, several writers have speculated that the 5th century Irish Ogham script, with its quinary alphabet system, was derived from a finger alphabet that predates even Bede.

European monks from at least the time of Bede have made use of forms of manual communication, including alphabetic gestures, for a number of reasons: communication among the monastery while observing vows of silence, administering to the ill, and as mnemonic devices. They also may have been used as ciphers for discreet or secret communication. Clear antecedents of many of the manual alphabets in use today can be seen from the 16th century in books published by friars in Spain and Italy. From the same time, monks such as the Benedictine Fray Pedro Ponce de León began tutoring deaf children of wealthy patrons — in some places, literacy was a requirement for legal recognition as an heir — and the manual alphabets found a new purpose. They were originally part of the earliest known Mouth Hand Systems. The first book on deaf education, published in 1620 by Juan Pablo Bonet in Madrid, included a detailed account of the use of a manual alphabet to teach deaf students to read and speak.

This alphabet was adopted by the Abbé de l'Épée's deaf school in Paris in the 18th century and then spread to deaf communities around the world in the 19th and 20th centuries via educators who had learned it in Paris. Over time variations have emerged, brought about by the natural phonetic changes that have occurred over time, adaptations for local written forms with special characters or diacritics (which are sometimes represented with the other hand) and avoidance of handshapes considered obscene in some cultures.

Meanwhile, in Britain, manual alphabets were also in use for a number of purposes, such as secret communication, public speaking, or used for communication by deaf people. In 1648, John Bulwer described "Master Babington", a deaf man proficient in the use of a manual alphabet, "contryved on the joynts of his fingers", whose wife could converse with him easily, even in the dark through the use of tactile signing. In 1680, George Dalgarno published Didascalocophus, or, The deaf and dumb mans tutor, in which he presented his own method of deaf education, including an arthropological alphabet. Charles de La Fin published a book in 1692 describing an alphabetic system where pointing to a body part represented the first letter of the part (e.g. Brow=B), and vowels were located on the fingertips as with the other British systems. He described codes for both English and Latin.

The vowels of these early British manual alphabets, across the tips of the fingers, have survived in the contemporary alphabets used in British Sign Language, Auslan and New Zealand Sign Language. The earliest known printed pictures of consonants of the modern two-handed alphabet appeared in 1698 with Digiti Lingua, a pamphlet by an anonymous author who was himself unable to speak. He suggested that the manual alphabet could also be used by mutes, for silence and secrecy, or purely for entertainment. Nine of its letters can be traced to earlier alphabets, and 17 letters of the modern two-handed alphabet can be found among the two sets of 26 handshapes depicted.

== See also ==
- American manual alphabet
- Catalan manual alphabet
- Chilean manual alphabet
- Cued Speech
- French manual alphabet
- Initialized sign
- Irish manual alphabet
- Japanese manual syllabary
- Korean manual alphabet
- Nepali manual alphabet
- Polish manual alphabet
- Russian manual alphabet
- Sign name
- Spanish manual alphabet
- Turkish Sign Language
- Two-handed manual alphabet

== Gallery ==
Engravings of Reducción de las letras y arte para enseñar a hablar a los mudos (Bonet, 1620):
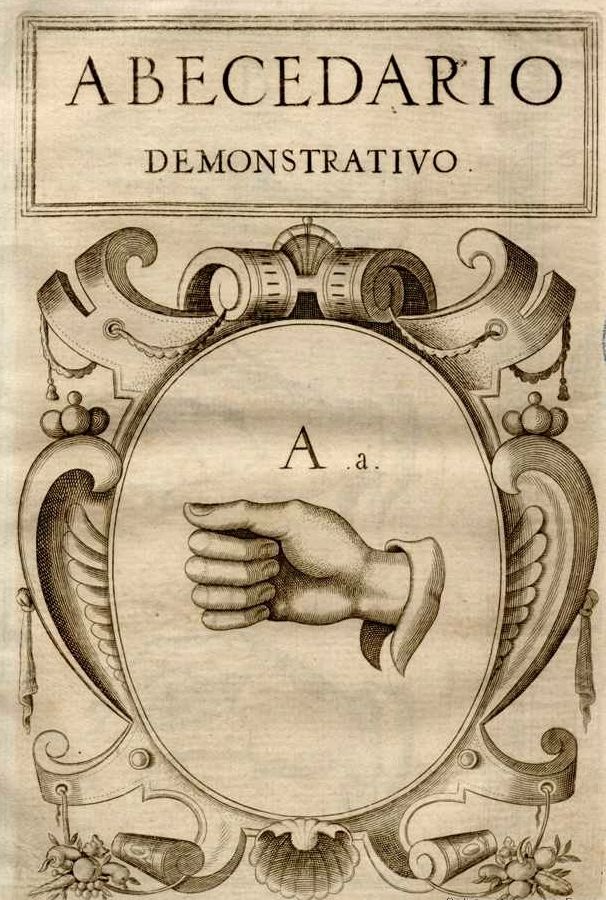
A

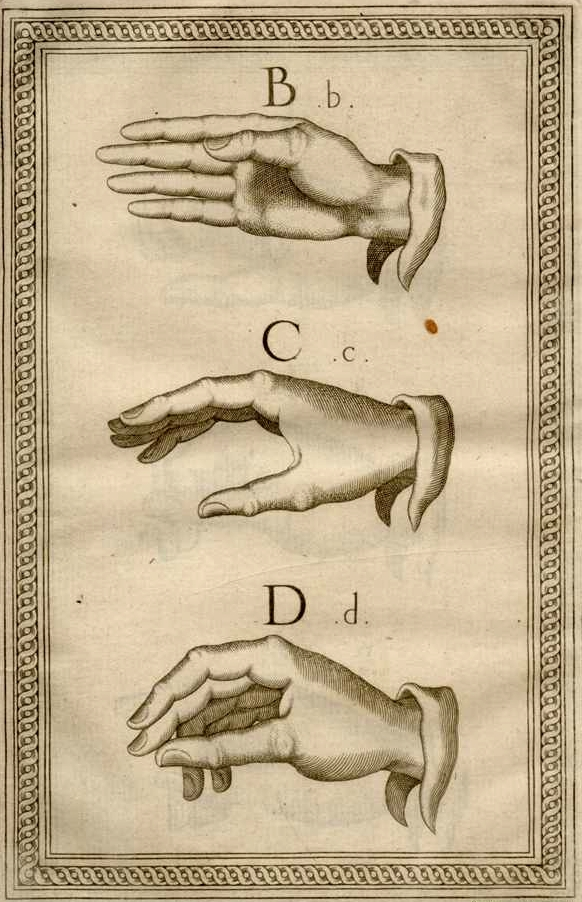
B, C, D

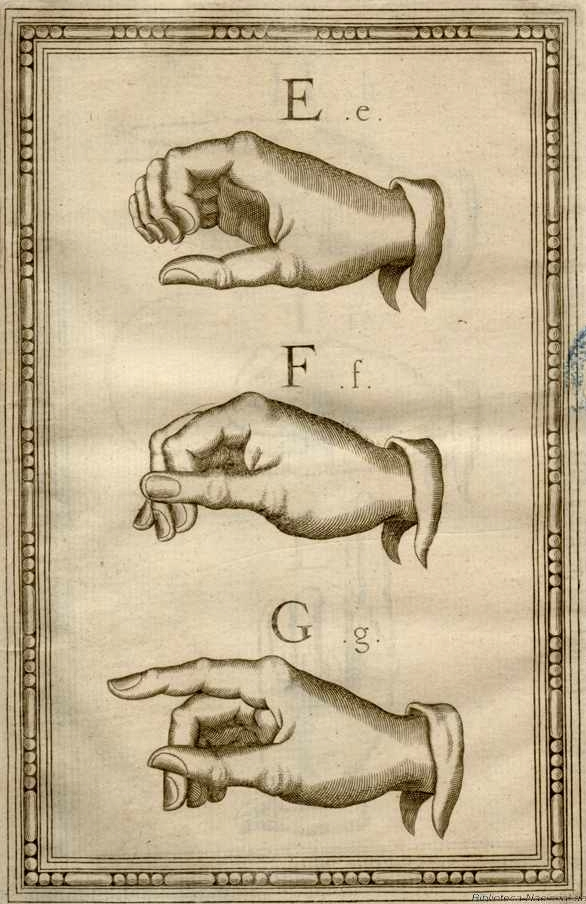
E, F, G

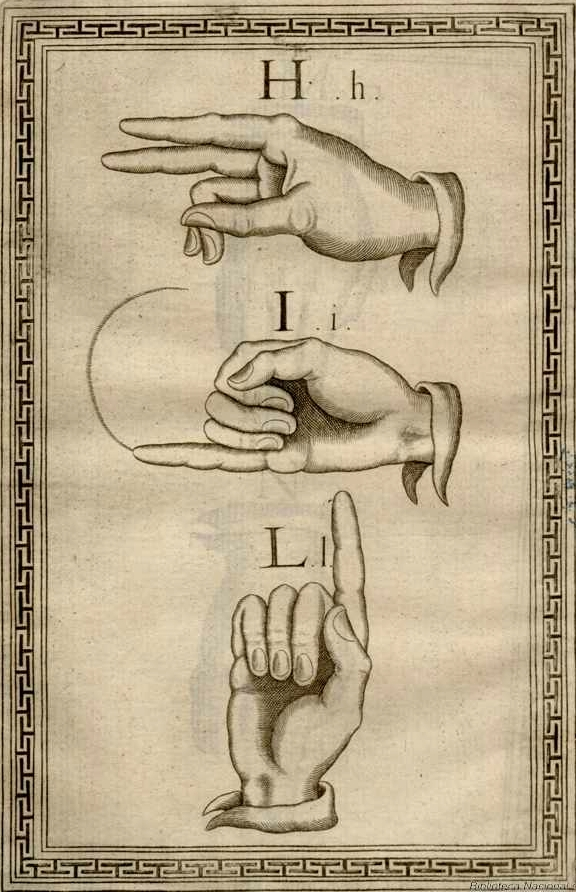
H, I, L

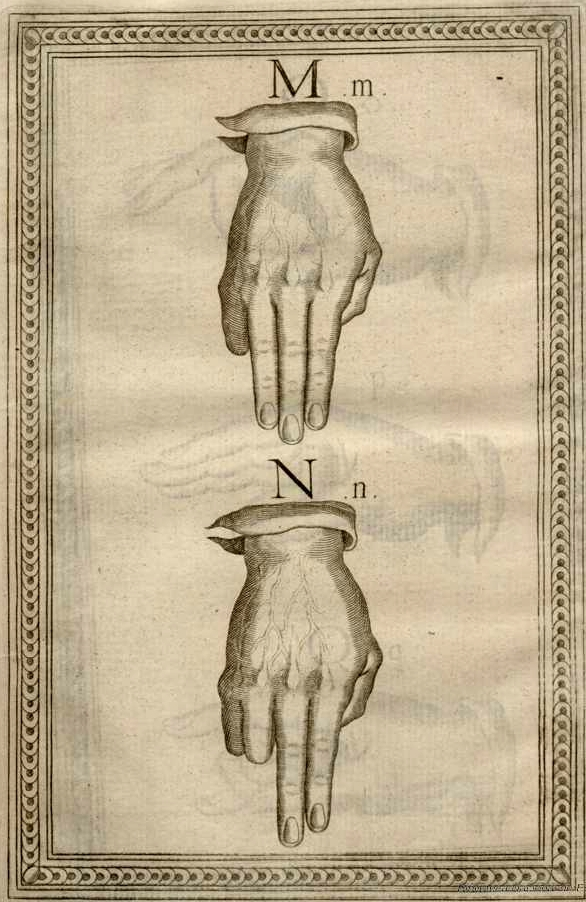
M, N

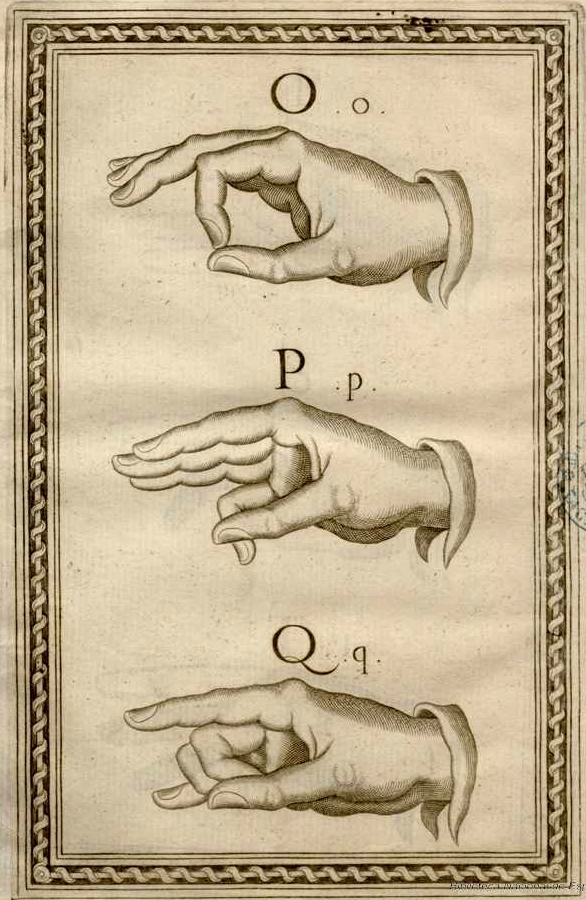
O, P, Q

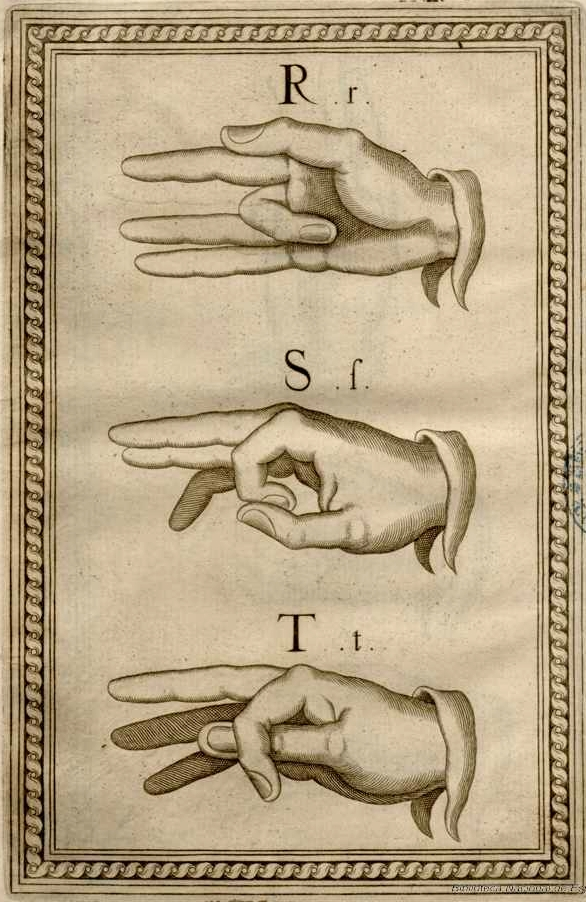
R, S, T

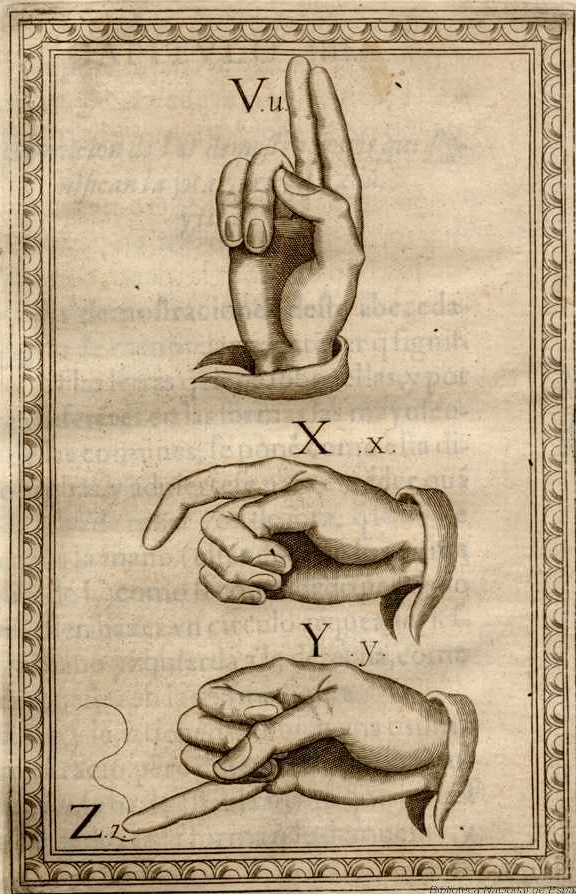
V, X, Y, Z
Other historical manual alphabets:
Alphabetic gestures have been discovered in hundreds of medieval and renaissance paintings. The above is from Fernando Gallego's retablo panels, 1480–1488, in Ciudad Rodrigo.

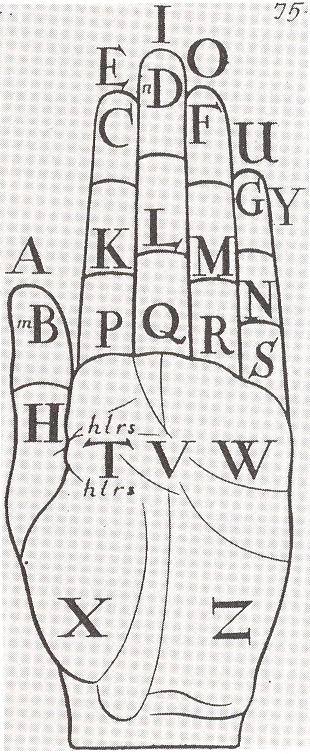
Plate from John Bulwer's 1648 publication Philocophus, or the Deaf and Dumbe Mans Friend (London)

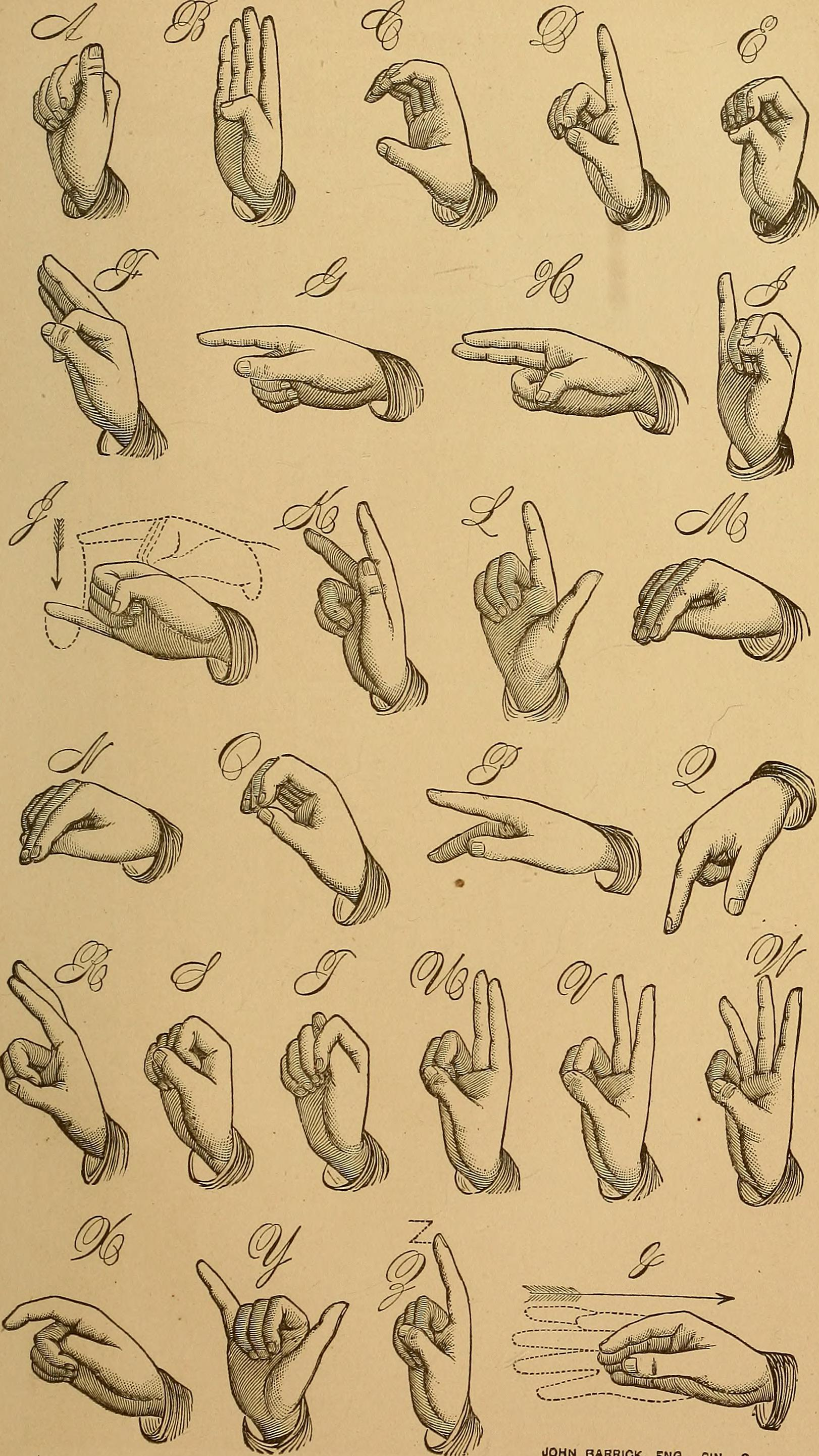
American Manual Alphabet (1882). Letters are shown from a variety of orientations.

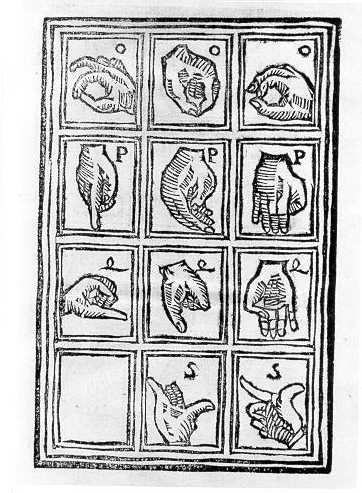
Antique hand memory system, three variants. Originally published in "Thesavrvs Artificiosae Memoriae", in Venice, 1579.
Numbers in the American Sign Language:
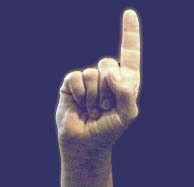
1

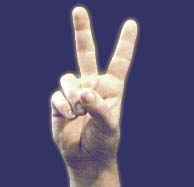
2

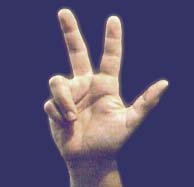
3

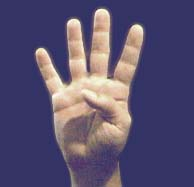
4

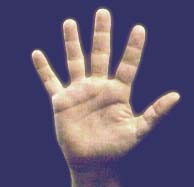
5

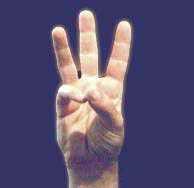
6

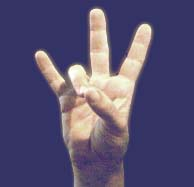
7

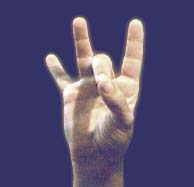
8

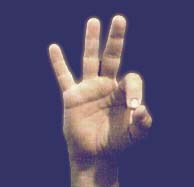
9

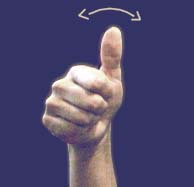
10
