= Kata Kolok =

Village sign language of Bali, Indonesia

Bengkala Sign Language
- Kata Kolok
- Native to: Bali, Indonesia
- Region: One village in the northern part of the island
- Signers: 40 deaf signers (2007); 1,200 hearing signers (2011)
- Language family: Language isolate

Language codes
- ISO 639-3: bqy
- Glottolog: beng1239
- ELP: Kata Kolok

Kata Kolok (lit. 'deaf talk'), also known as Bengkala Sign Language and Balinese Sign Language, is a village sign language which is indigenous to two neighbouring villages in northern Bali, Indonesia. The main village, Bengkala, has had high incidences of deafness for over seven generations. Notwithstanding the biological time depth of the recessive mutation that causes deafness, the first substantial cohort of deaf signers did not occur until five generations ago, and this event marks the emergence of Kata Kolok. The sign language has been acquired by at least five generations of deaf, native signers and features in all aspects of village life, including political, professional, educational, and religious settings.

Kata Kolok is linguistically unrelated to spoken Balinese or other sign languages. It lacks certain common contact sign phenomena that often arise when a sign language and an oral language are in close contact, such as fingerspelling and mouthing. It differs from other known sign languages in a number of respects: signers make extensive use of cardinal directions and real-world locations to organize the signing space, and they do not use a metaphorical "time line" for time reference. Additionally, Kata Kolok is the only known sign language which predominantly deploys an absolute frame of reference rather than an intrinsic or relative frame.

The Max Planck Institute for Psycholinguistics (MPI) and the International Institute for Sign Languages and Deaf Studies have archived over 100 hours of Kata Kolok video data. The metadata of this corpus are accessible online (see www.mpi.nl).

Deaf people in the village express themselves using special cultural forms such as deaf dance and martial arts and occupy special ritual and social roles, including digging graves and maintaining water pipes. Deaf and hearing villagers alike share a belief in a deaf god.

== History ==
=== Background ===
Kata Kolok was most likely established due to the prevalence of hereditary sensorineural deafness caused by a recessive non-syndromic mutation of the MYO15A gene. This gene led to a significant population of hearing-impaired people in Bengkal village. According to the 1995 census, around 2.2% of the village population has impaired hearing.

This form of communication is thought to have been established from five to seven generations ago. According to a 2011 census in the village of Bengkal, around 1,500 people out of 2,740 people, or 57% of the population, were able to communicate in this language, in addition to 46 hearing-impaired people. In addition, at least eight hearing-impaired people from Bengkal who have left the village, then returning after a while were still able to use Kata Kolok.

=== Usage in Bengkal village ===
Kata Kolok usually used when at least one of the interlocutors is deaf. It can also be used by hearing interlocutors when they are far apart or working with noisy equipment. Kata Kolok can be used in all areas of life: i.e. used to communicate when repairing water pipes or when a village nurse need to communicate with hearing-impaired patients.

Due to the high proportion of people who were able to communicate in Kata Kolok, a deaf child can learn it from birth in the same way that hearing children learn spoken language.

== Phonology ==
In the study of different gesture languages, such as American Sign Language, gestures are decomposed into several components: palm shape, hand orientation, gesture, and hand movement were taken into account denoting meaning. If gestures differ in only one component, they are said to form minimal pairs. The presence of such pairs allows user to prove that the differing parameters have phoneme and meaning. User of any sign language pay attention to them when determining the meaning of an utterance, and the transition from one meaning to another changes the content of the gesture.

Unlike mentioned phonology characteristic of sign language, in Kata Kolok, it is almost impossible to identify minimal pairs, so it is difficult to determine the phoneme status of the palm forms used in gesturing.

All palm shapes observed in Kata Kolok can be categorized into 3 category: basic (i.e. the simplest configurations that are easily recognised and used in a large number of gestures), regular (found in a certain number of gestures but less frequently than basic), and limited (used in a single gesture).

Basic palm shapes include the following configurations:

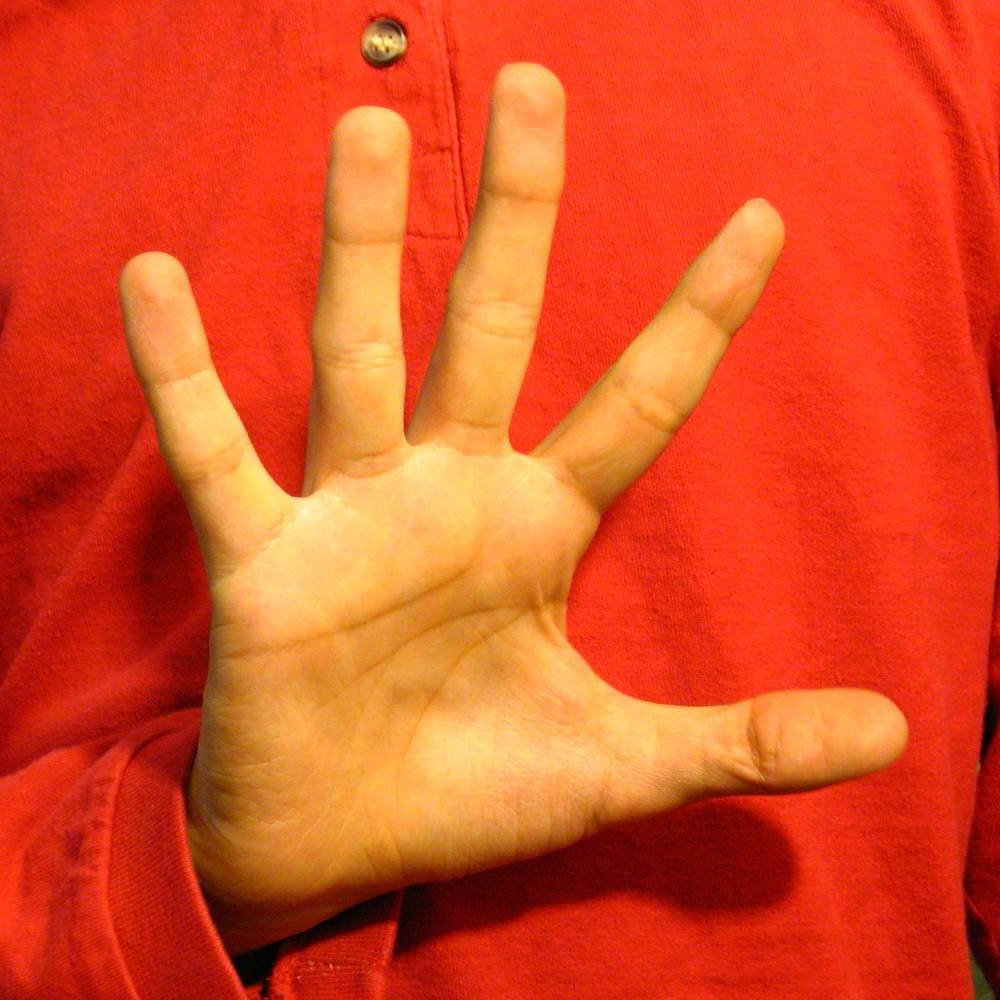
a form of the palm in which all fingers are fully extended and spread apart.

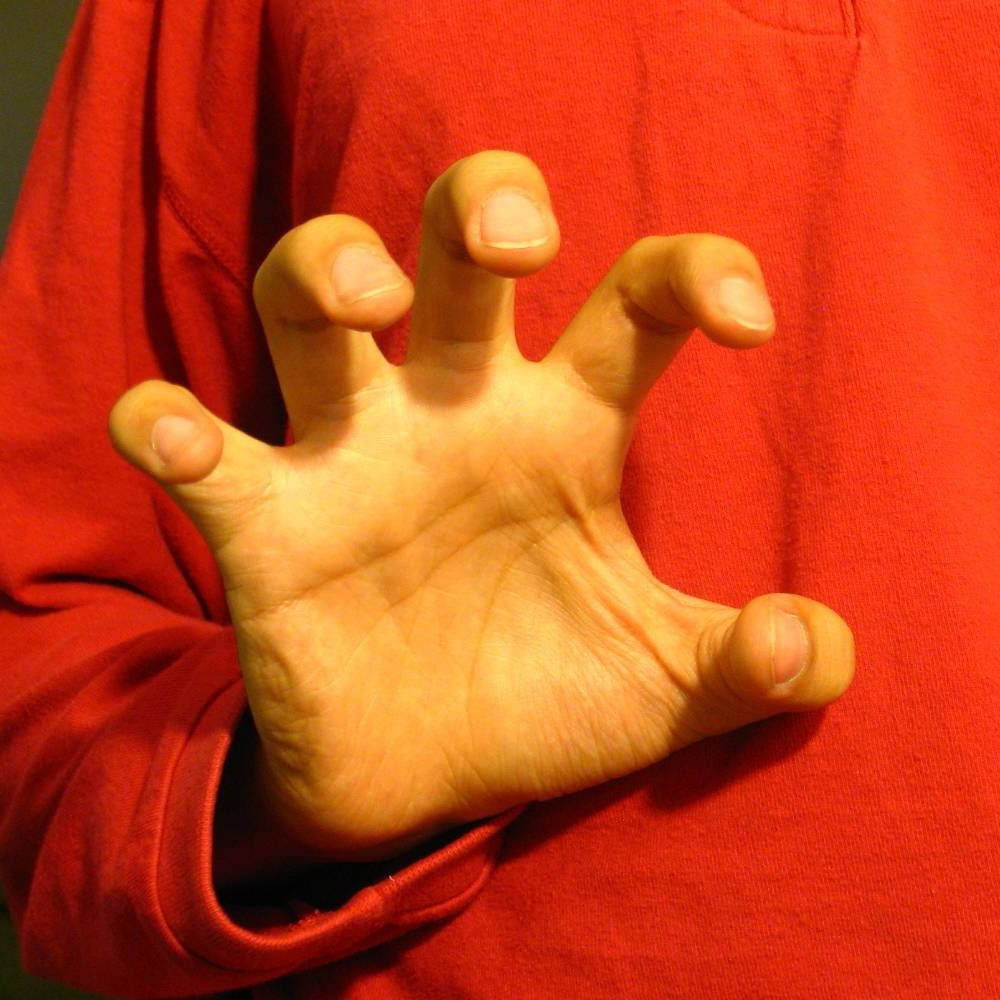
Curved-5, A palm shape in which all fingers are separated and slightly bent at each joint.

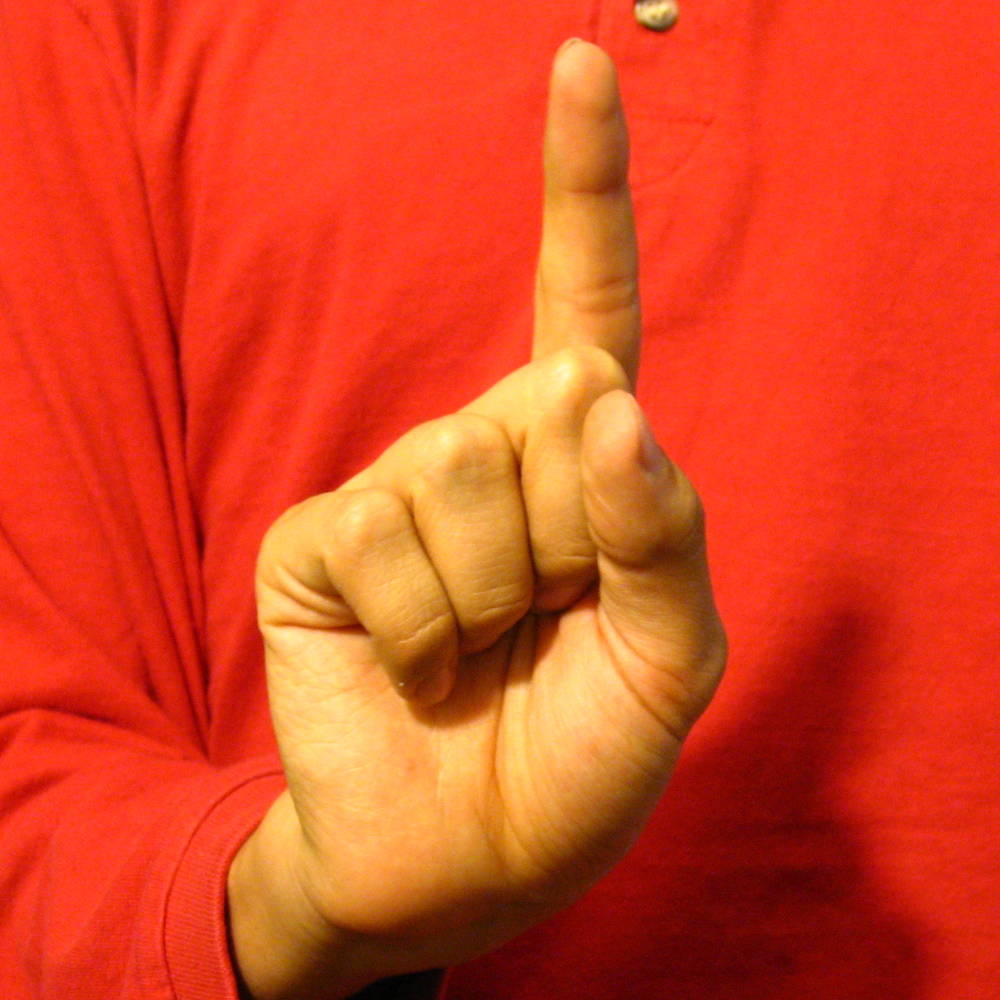
IX, The index finger is extended, the rest of the fingers are clenched into a fist.

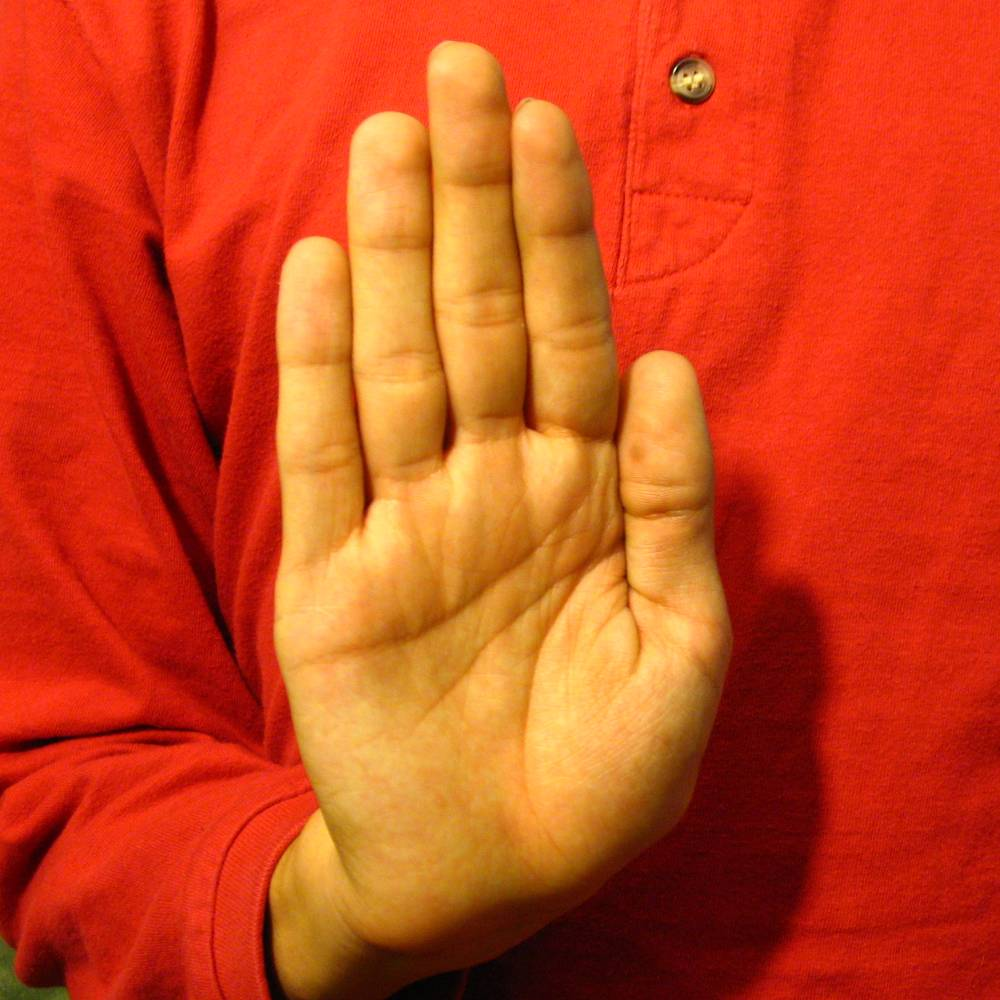
B, A palm shape in which all fingers are fully extended and folded together.

Curved-B, fingers folded together and slightly bent at each joint, forming an arc.

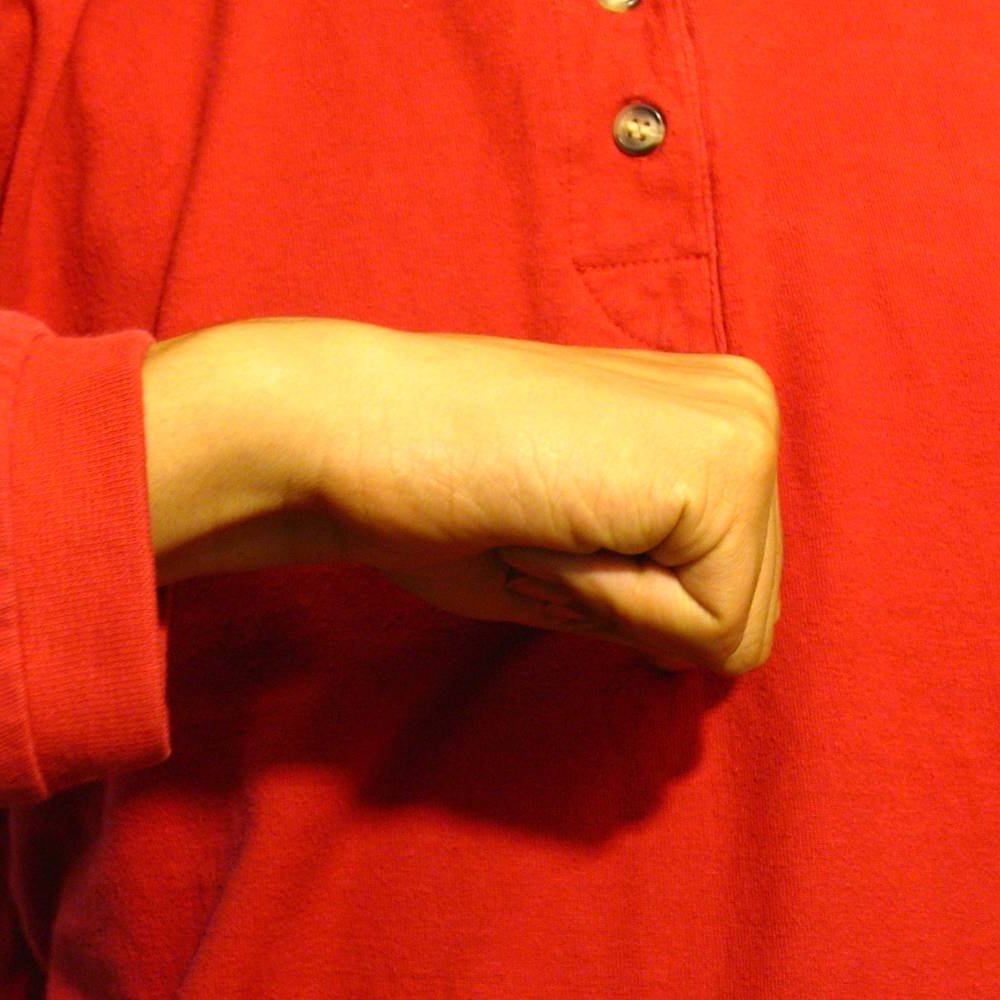
A, Fingers folded into a fist, thumb resting on the side of the other four fingers.

== Bibliography ==
- de Vos, Connie (2012), Sign-Spatiality in Kata Kolok, Nijmegen: University of Nijmegen
- de Vos, Connie (2012b). U. Zeshan, C. de Vos (ed.). "Kata Kolok: An updated sociolinguistic profile". Sign Languages in Village Communities. DeGruyter & Ishara Press): 381–386.
- Connie de Vos, Ulrike Zeshan (2012). U. Zeshan, C. de Vos (ed.). "Introduction: Demographic, sociocultural, and linguistic variation across rural signing communities". Sign Languages in Village Communities. DeGruyter & Ishara Press: 2–23. doi:10.1515/9781614511496.2. hdl:11858/00-001M-0000-000F-EBB6-B. ISBN 978-1-61451-203-5.
- de Vos, Connie (2012c), U. Zeshan, C. de Vos (ed.), The Kata Kolok perfective in child signing: Coordination of manual and non-manual components, DeGruyter & Ishara Press, pp. 127–152, doi:10.1515/9781614511496.2, hdl:11858/00-001M-0000-000F-EBB6-B
- Connie de Vos, Roland Pfau (2015). "Sign Language Typology: The Contribution of Rural Sign Languages". Annual Review of Linguistics. 1: 265–288. doi:10.1146/annurev-linguist-030514-124958. hdl:11858/00-001M-0000-0019-DA09-5.
- Annelies Kusters (2009). "Deaf Utopias? Reviewing the Sociocultural Literature on the World's "Martha's Vineyard Situations"". The Journal of Deaf Studies and Deaf Education. 15: 3–16. doi:10.1093/deafed/enp026. PMID 19812282.
- Victoria Nyst (2012), "24. Shared sign languages", in Roland Pfau; Markus Steinbach; Bencie Woll (eds.), Sign Language (Sign Language. An International Handbook ed.), Berlin, Boston: DeGruyter, p. 552—574, doi:10.1515/9783110261325.552, hdl:1887/3589962, ISBN 978-3-11-020421-6
