= Chilean Sign Language =

Deaf sign language of Chile

- Lengua de Señas Chilena
- Native to: Chile
- Signers: 21,000 (2011)
- Language family: ?Chile-Paraguay-Uruguay Sign ?Francosign: Chilean Sign Language

Language codes
- ISO 639-3: csg
- Glottolog: chil1264
- ELP: Chilean Sign Language

Chilean Sign Language (Spanish: Lengua de señas chilena, LSCh) is the sign language of Chile's seven deaf institutions. It is used by people all over Chile and is the primary language used by the deaf community, being used for television interpretations. There is variation within the language depending on factors such as geographical location, age, and educational background.

== Geographic Distributions ==
Mainly spoken all across Chile

=== Regions ===
- Santiago
- Iquique
- Puerto Montt
- Punta Arenas

=== Estimated Population Use ===
In 2004, it had been estimated that about 292,700 people (1.8%) of the Chilean population had some type of auditory deficiency. About half of the people with auditory deficiency are over the age of 65. This leaves the estimated number of users who actually use LSCh at only about 21,000 people.

== Recognition and Status ==
There have been many movements to get the Chilean government to try to get LSCh (Chilean sign language) regulated within the country. Schools and churches are trying to create more programs to try to encourage deaf leadership training and empowering deaf people to make decisions for their own communities. It was recognized in 2009.

=== Government Services and Laws ===
There are no government services specifically for sign language and deaf people. Fondo Nacional de la Discapacidad (FONADIS) is the government department responsible for the providing services. There are also no laws to prevent discrimination while applying for jobs, although there is a branch created to look for jobs for deaf people.

=== Education ===
There are about 20 schools spread across Chile geared towards deaf students. There is not one system of doing it with different towns doing it differently. For example, in the country's capital, Santiago, students are only identified as speech only or sign only and learn in different environments. Students with implants are identified as speech only. There are 4 universities developed for deaf students based on standardized test scores. Studies show that out of 17 people, about 10 were taught LSCh through school while the other 7 were either taught by a family member or out of school environments.

=== Dictionaries ===
LSCh has a couple of standard Spanish-to-LSCh dictionaries, such as the Diccionario Bilingüe Lengua de Señas Chilena-Español. In 2008, 30 representatives from all across Chile came together to create a standard dictionary.

== Fingerspelling ==
The manual alphabet of LSCh includes the 27 Spanish alphabet letters, and, as in many sign languages, is used to spell names and words that do not have standard signs. Fingerspelling is defined as a visual form that reflects the graphemes that make up words, providing a means by which to gain access to the segmental information of words. It has been integrated into the deaf community for a variety reasons which include "when a concept lacks a specific sign, for proper nouns, for loan signs, or when signs are ambiguous."

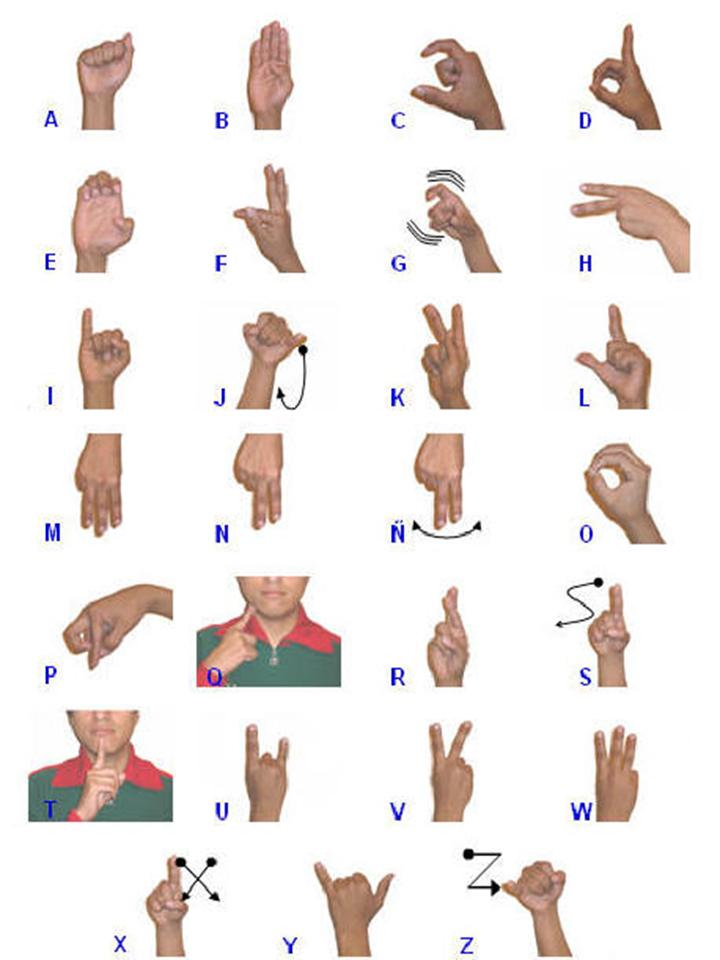
The Chilean fingerspelling alphabet (view from listener)

== See also ==
- Chilean manual alphabet
- Sign language
