= Russian manual alphabet =

Fingerspelling system for Russian

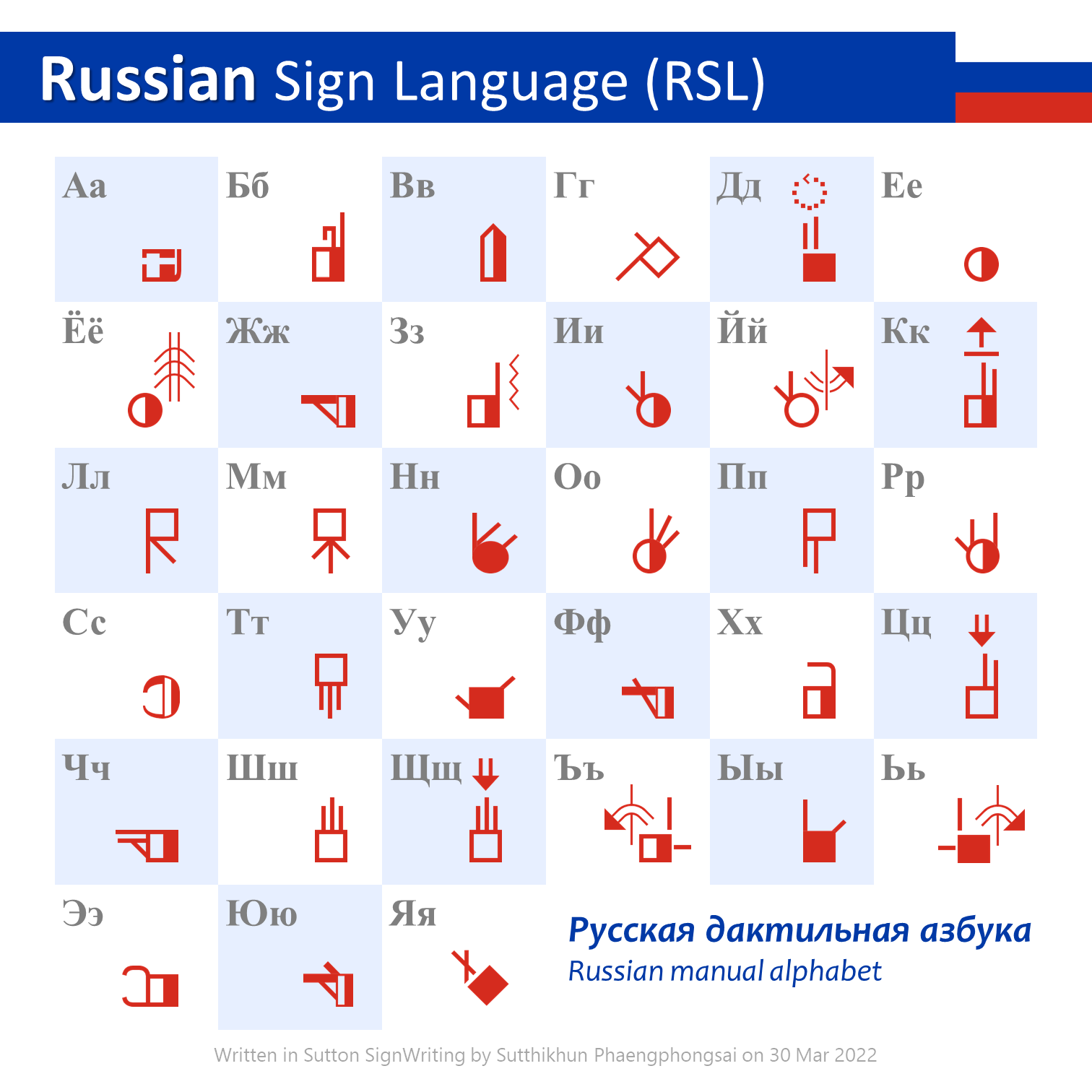
Russian manual alphabet written in Sutton SignWriting

The Russian Manual Alphabet (RMA) is used for fingerspelling in Russian Sign Language.

Like many other manual alphabets, the Russian Manual Alphabet bears similarities to the French Manual Alphabet. However, it was adapted to account for the letters of the Cyrillic alphabet found in the Russian written language. It is a one-handed alphabet. RMA includes 33 hand gestures, each of which corresponds to one letter in the Russian alphabet. There are no signs denoting punctuation or capitalization.

In 2015, researchers at the Peoples' Friendship University of Russia developed a software–hardware system that converted RMA gestures into textual form.
