= Iosif Florianovich Geilman =

Soviet sign language expert

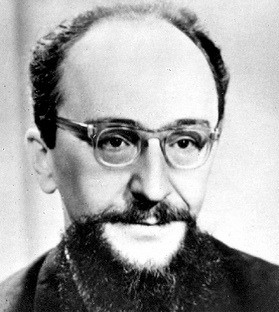
- Born: 3 March 1923; Petrograd, RSFSR, USSR
- Died: 13 June 2010 (aged 87); Saint-Petersburg, Russia
- Citizenship: USSR, Russia
- Occupations: Educator, Interpreter

Iosif Florianovich Geilman (Russian: Иосиф Флорианович Гейльман; 3 March 1923 — 13 June 2010) was a Soviet and international expert on sign language, a sign language interpreter and the author of multiple publications used to this day. Also, he was the founder and first director of the first All-Russian Educational Center for the Deaf known as LRC (Leningrad Rehabilitation Center), where hearing-impaired from all across the USSR came to receive higher education or trade skills. Iosif Geilman was one of the key experts on the committee entrusted to develop Gestuno, an international sign language.

== Childhood and teenage years ==
Iosif Geilman was born into a Russian/Jewish/German family in post-revolutionary Russia on March 3, 1923. His ancestors emigrated to Russia from Germany and one of them was a Fire Chief in the city of St. Petersburg. Iosif's parents, Florian and Elizaveta Geilman, were deaf, but commanded spoken language as well as sign language. Iosif's father, Florian, graduated from the Stieglitz Arts and Crafts Academy and then worked as a design engineer at the Elektrosila Plant. Elizaveta graduated from the Smolny Institute of Noble Maidens and then worked at the Karl Bulla Photo Editing Shop. She was also an actress at the Drama Studio for the Deaf until the Studio was dismantled in 1937 and its director became a political prisoner. Iosif also had an older brother, Oleg, who moved to the city of Gelendzhik after getting married and then served in World War II and was a highly awarded officer. The ambiance and atmosphere at Iosif's home inspired his future professional path. His family held gatherings for the deaf community of Saint Petersburg, and the young Iosif would interpret radio broadcasts for the guests. At the age of 15, Iosif joined the All-Russian Society of the Deaf as a sign language interpreter, becoming the youngest such interpreter in Leningrad and two years later, he became a student at the Leningrad State University studying history.

== War years ==
In June 1941, just before the Great Patriotic War broke out, Pavel Saveliev, the first chairman of the All-Russian Society of the Deaf, asked Iosif to serve as a guide and interpreter for a group of 300 deaf children embarking on a boat tour on the Volga River from Moscow to Astrakhan. However, World War II impeded the plans, and Iosif and the group were stranded in the city of Yaroslavl. Between 1941 and 1943, the young man was responsible for caring for these deaf children. In 1944, after the siege was lifted, Iosif returned to Leningrad to discover that his parents had not survived the severe days of starvation and privation during the siege of Leningrad. To commemorate his parents, Iosif began working as a sign language interpreter for the All-Russian Society of the Deaf. It was also during these years that Iosif reunited with Marina, a childhood friend. Marina's family offered him hospitality when he had nowhere to go, and the two soon married.

== Vocation and professional path ==
While working as a sign-language interpreter, Iosif uncovered the need to perfect the Russian Sign Language, as his observations led him to believe that it had a certain degree of paucity and scarcity, as it had a certain scarcity of expression in the way it was used by the Russian community of the deaf, and his observations impelled him to act.

Per Iosif's initiative, a specialized school (#92) of secondary education with in-person and distance learning systems was opened in the 1950s for the working young men and women of Leningrad with a hearing impairment. The role of the principal was taken on by Marina Anohina, after Iosif showed her his first publication, a primer book for the deaf. This event launched Iosif's active and profound research into the particularities of the Russian Sign Language. Iosif outlined his findings in his prolific research publications, which included his 1956 manual titled Signing and Fingerspelling: Practice Exercises and Texts, The Fingerspelling Alphabet and Signs of the Deaf in 1957 and a four-volume dictionary in the 1970s titled Unique Communication Methods of the Deaf.

Teaching played a major role in Iosif's career. He authored a manual called Training Interpreters: Study Plan and Course Programs, for which the target audience was actually students learning sign language from scratch. Some 200 novice interpreters were trained through Iosif Geilman's proprietary courses in 1961–1968, referred by local branches of the All-Russian Society for the Deaf.

Mr. Geilman's pursuits were not limited to the space within Soviet borders. Even during the years of the Iron Curtain, Iosif became a prominent name in the international sign language community and attended multiple congresses and symposiums abroad, both in the Eastern Bloc and in the West, in such countries as Italy and the United States – a fact signifying eminence in professional circles, for most Soviet citizens were not permitted to visit the West.

Iosif was the deputy chairman of the World Federation of the Deaf (WFD) and part of the expert committee evolving Gestuno, the original international sign language, which is now more commonly known as ISL (International Sign Language). Mr. Geilman was a member of the WFD committee on social rehabilitation of the deaf for many years.

He was friends with William Castle of The National Technical Institute for the Deaf, which is part of the Rochester Institute of Technology and the 1st Technical School for the deaf in the world. The two colleagues and advocates for the deaf met again later when Iosif retired and emigrated to the U.S.

A turning point in the life of Iosif Geilman was the opening of the ASD LRC Technical School (All-Russian Society of the Deaf Leningrad Rehabilitation Center), an educational facility unique for the USSR in its concept. The center became a one-of-a-kind educational hub, where talented young men and women came to study from all over the USSR. The main mission was to bring the hearing and/or speech-impaired up to par in literacy and professional capacity and enable them to stand on their own two feet in social and professional circles. These young people received quality education as illustrators, accountants, organizers of cultural and educational events, sign language interpreters, radio-electronic equipment specialists, bookbinders, type-setters, printers, etc. The Leningrad Rehabilitation Center Polytechnical School was located at 20 Berezovaya Alleya in the city of Pavlovsk, a suburb of Leningrad. It was financed by funding from the All-Russian Society of the Deaf. Iosif Geilman became the center's director and remained in that capacity for the next twenty years until his retirement. Under his caring and thorough guidance, the Center grew and expanded, branching out into new areas, such as cultural and educational activities, physical education and physical therapy, as well as a department of sign language interpreting. Lidia Sinitsina, director of a Regional Rehabilitation Center, had this to say about Mr. Geilman's contribution and character:

"Iosif Florianovich created this center and left it for the generations to come. He gravitated towards the center every day, always surrounded by younger generations."

Among Iosif's other social accomplishments was successfully insisting that all broadcasts on Russia's central news channel be accompanied by sign language translation and that deaf drivers would be allowed to obtain a private driver's license.

== Family and personal life ==
Iosif was married to Marina Geilman in 1945, and their marriage lasted until her death in 2003.

In 1991, Iosif Geilman emigrated to the United States. He then lived between the two countries and died in Russia.

Iosif had two children: his son Cyril also became a sign-language specialist and the director of a cultural center for the deaf in Russia, while his daughter Natasha majored in English, earned a PhD and took the path of a linguist (translator, interpreter and editor), worked in research on speech and phonetics, and later ran a translation company in the United States.

Iosif has five grandchildren. The eldest, Ekaterina Rodneva, is a Russian as a Second Language teacher at the St. Petersburg State University, as well as a wife and mother. Vladimir Reznikov, who grew up in the U.S., is a translator of numerous books, poems and songs, a conference and legal interpreter and, like his grandfather, has developed original training courses for translators and interpreters. Philipp Boltovsky, a husband and father of two, is a professional clarinetist and singer who performed with the Red Army Choir at the 2018 Olympics. Kseniya Geilman is a devoted mother in the United States. The youngest, Maria Boltovskaya, graduated from the St. Petersburg Conservatory as a violinist and now plays in the section of first violins for the St. Petersburg Capella.

In his time away from work, Iosif was an avid gardener, a talented poet and an accomplished chess player. After moving to the U.S., he enjoyed spending time with his grandkids and exploring the neighborhoods with his rottweiler, Gabriel.

An expert on International Sign Language, Iosif could fluently communicate with hearing-impaired from various countries though languages differ significantly.

First and foremost, he was a man of honor and integrity. As related by a former student: Once during the Soviet years, a student at the technical school was supposed to be disqualified for authoring a nudist painting, a work unfit for a communist country. The committee of Communist Party Members voted to expel the young man. Iosif's defiant and risky response followed: "My student stays. If he goes, I go." And the young artist was not expelled.

One of Iosif's quotes was: "As soon as people begin to understand one another better, life will be much more pleasant and sane..."

== Memory ==
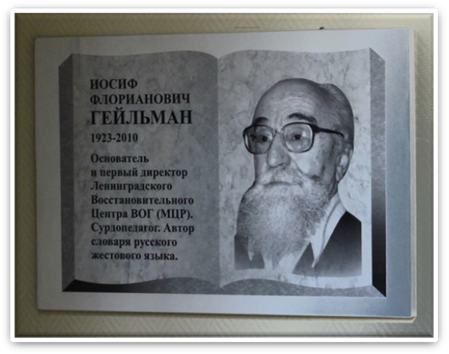
The memorial plaque dedicated to Iosif Florianovich Geilman on April 6th, 2017 at the Regional Center of the Hearing Impaired (formerly, the Leningrad Rehabilitation Center).

Iosif Florianovich Geilman died in June 2010. He is buried at the Serafimovskoye Cemetery in St. Petersburg. On April 6, 2017, a memorial plaque was dedicated to Iosif Geilman at the Regional Center of the Hearing Impaired (formerly, the Leningrad Rehabilitation Center).

== Publications ==
- Geilman I.F.Unique Communication Methods of the Deaf: Dactylology and Facial Expressions: A Manual: [in 5 parts.] / I.F. Geilman // Polytechnic school of the Leningrad Rehabilitation Center of VOG (All-Russian Society of the Deaf). — Leningrad: LRC VOG, 1975. — 166 p.
- Geilman I.F. Exercises and Texts as an Aid in Dactylology and Facial Expression Based Translation: Textbook [2-nd edition, expanded and revised.] / I.F. Geilman // Polytechnic school of the Leningrad Rehabilitation Center of VOG (All-Russian Society of the Deaf). — Leningrad: LRC VOG, 1975. — 114 p.
- Geilman I.F.The Fingerspelling Alphabet and Signs of the Deaf-Mute / I.F. Geilman. — Moscow: KOIZ (All-Russian Collaborative United Publishing House), 1957. — 596 p.
- Geilman I.F. Studying Gestuno: A Manual / I.F. Geilman // Polytechnic school of the Leningrad Rehabilitation Center of VOG (All-Russian Society of the Deaf). — Leningrad: LRC VOG, 1982. — 93 p.
- Educational and Behavioral Aspects of Working with Deaf Students in Their Professional Training,. A Collection of articles. / [edited by I.F. Geilman, L.G. Signitskaya]. — Leningrad, 1974. — 65 p.
- Geilman I.F. Sign Language – Your Friend: Dictionary, Exercises, Phrasebook / I.F. Geilman. — Saint Petersburg.: Leningrad Mixed Partnership (LIO) "Redaktor", 2002. — 176 p.
- Geilman I.F. Dactylology: A Textbook / I.F. Geilman. — Polytechnic school of the Leningrad Rehabilitation Center of VOG (All-Russian Society of the Deaf). — Leningrad: LRC VOG, 1981. — 86 p.
- Geilman I.F. Sign Language Dictionary: [in 2 volumes] / I.F. Geilman. — second edition, expanded and revised. — 2004. — 363 p.
