= Irish manual alphabet =

Manual alphabet used in Irish Sign Language

The Irish manual alphabet is the manual alphabet used in Irish Sign Language. Compared with other manual alphabets based on the Latin alphabet, it has unusual forms for the letters G, K, L, P, and Q. Like most European sign languages, Irish Sign Language uses a one-handed fingerspelling system.

Within ISL, fingerspelling via the manual alphabet is common even among fluent ISL signers, though usage rates vary by age and gender. Two major uses are to signal contrastive code-switching (e.g., for emphasis or clarification), and to fill lexical gaps (words/concepts for which there is not an established or known ISL sign).

Irish manual alphabet

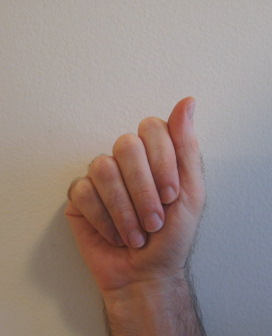
A

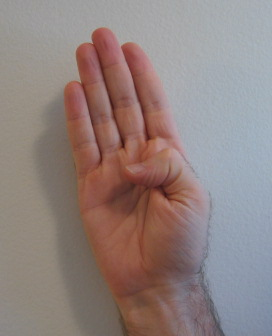
B

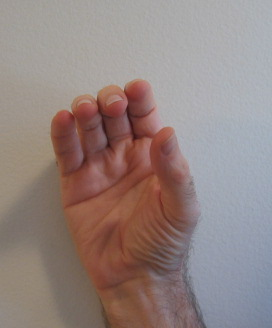
C

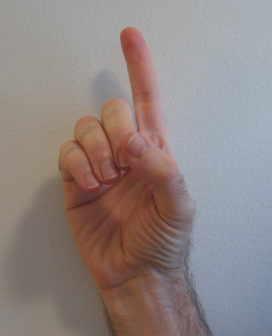
D

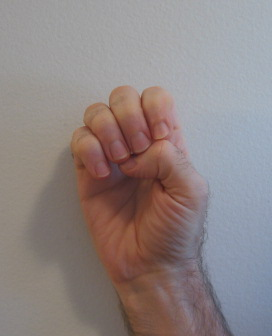
E

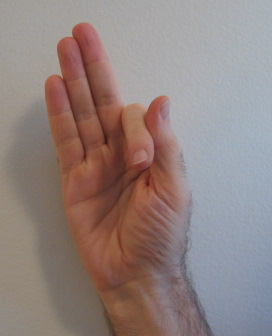
F

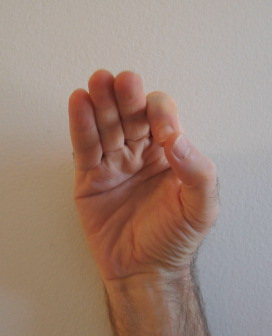
G

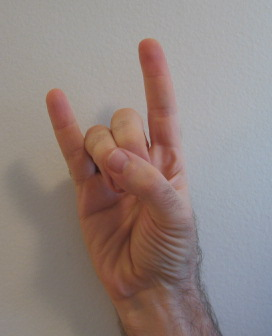
H

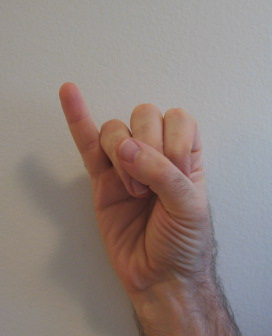
I

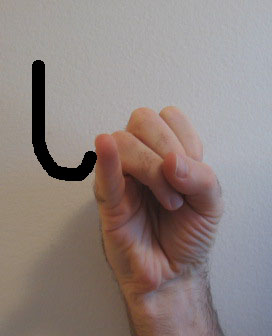
J

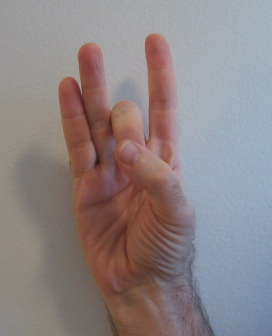
K

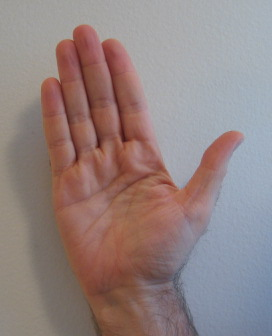
L

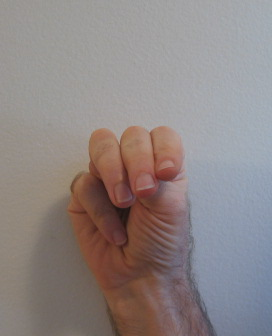
M

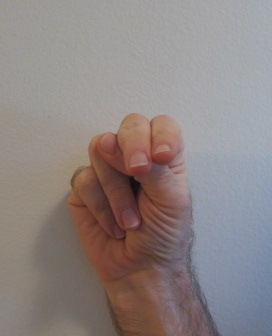
N

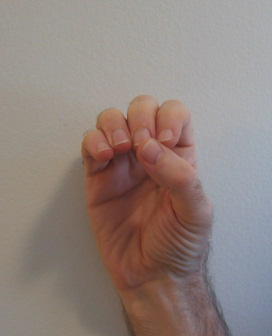
O

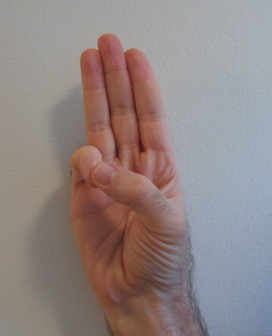
P

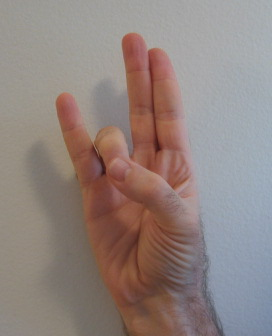
Q

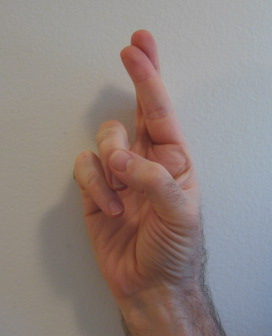
R

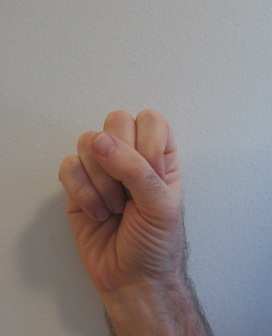
S

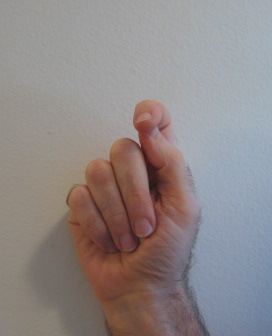
T

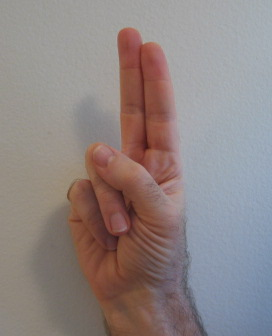
U

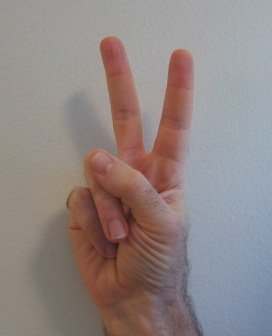
V

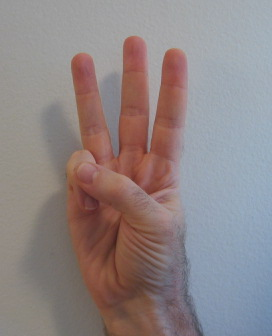
W

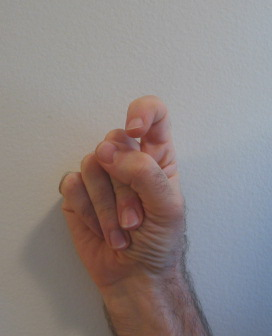
X

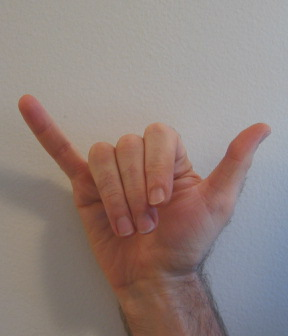
Y

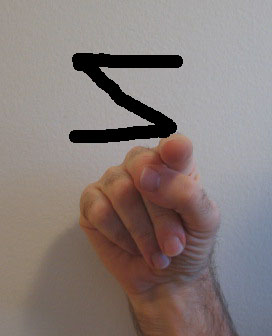
Z

== See also ==
- Fingerspelling
