= Signing space =

Sign language grammar

Typical signing space area for American Sign Language

Signing space is the space used by a signer using a sign language. It's the three-dimensional space in front of the signer, from the waist to the forehead and from one side of the body to the other, where signs can be realized. Signers use this space to represent physical space and to represent conceptual structure.

== Usage ==
Locations in a signing space are mapped to locations in the real space. It can be used to convey abstract information like time and order.

The signer also uses this space to position the entities that are evoked in the sentence (e.g. people, objects, buildings and places) and to demonstrate their semantic relationships. This is called placement.

The signer can introduce people into the conversation by signing their names, then placing them in the signing space. She can then refer back to them as 'he' or 'she' by just pointing to where she placed them instead of signing their name again. This is called syntactic placement.

The usage of signing space to show where places or objects are situated in relation to each other is called topographic placement.

== Linguistics ==
Sign languages take advantage of the three-dimensional space for a plethora of purposes. This space is used for referring to participants in a conversation, demonstrating the grammatical roles of participants in an event or illustrating information about different types of motion events.

Pronominal Usage

Sign languages have some forms to refer to participants in a conversation (e.g. signer, addressee, non-addressee). These forms strongly involve the usage of the signing space. By pointing towards his chest, the signer references himself. In some cultures where speakers of the spoken language point towards their noses to establish a reference to themselves, the nose is pointed to instead. Reference to the addressee or the non-addressee is done by pointing towards him or her. Index finger is used in these cases. In case of referring to plural participants, some sign languages may use other than the index finger.

== Size of signing space ==
Signing space extends from above the head of the signer to the waist vertically and from elbow to elbow horizontally. Signs are articulated on or in front of the body. The space can extend to as much as the whole body in shared sign languages and the signs may include even the back of a signer.
