= Spanish manual alphabet =

Fingerspelling systen

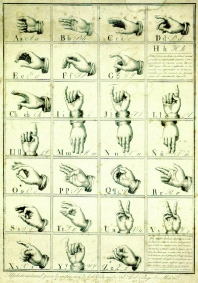
An early representation of the Spanish manual alphabet, engraved by Francisco de Paula Martí Mora (1761–1827) and published in 1815. Of an edition of 300, the only surviving copy is in the Biblioteca de Catalunya in Barcelona.

The Spanish manual alphabet is a fingerspelling system used in Spain. Different varieties are used in Madrid and Barcelona.
