= French manual alphabet =

Manual alphabet

The French manual alphabet is an alphabet used for French Sign Language (LSF), both to distinguish LSF words and to sign French words in LSF.

The alphabet has the following letters:

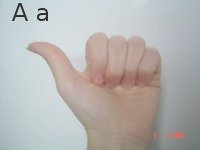
A

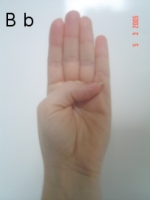
B

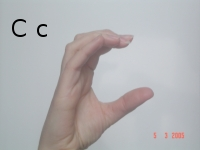
C
(seen from the side)

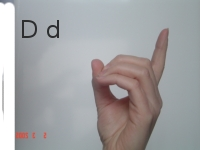
D
(seen from the side)

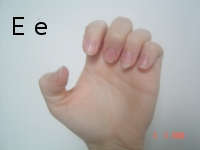
E

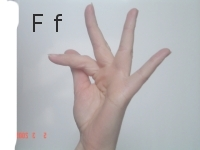
F
(seen from the side)

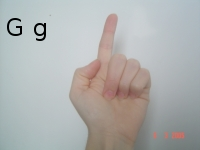
G

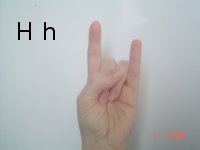
H

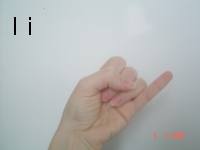
I

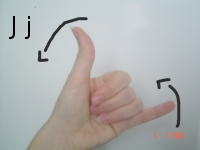
J

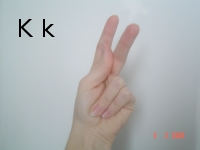
K

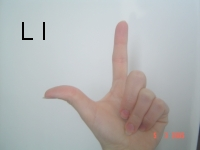
L

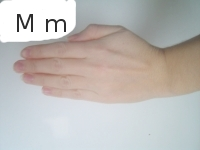
M

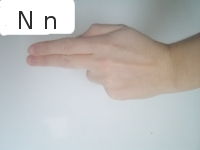
N

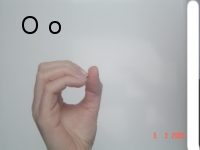
O
(seen from the side)

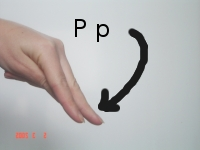
P
(seen from the side)

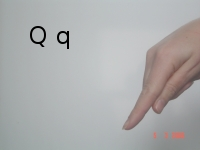
Q
(seen from the side)

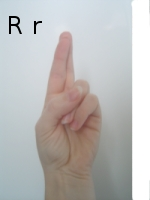
R

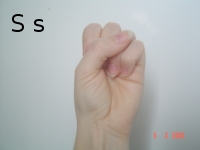
S

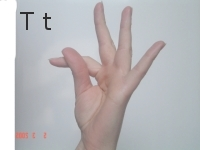
T
(seen from the side)

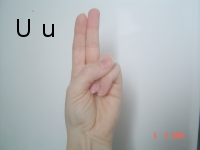
U

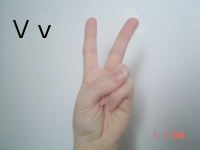
V

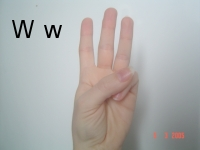
W

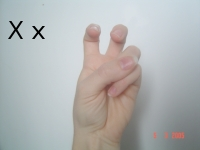
X

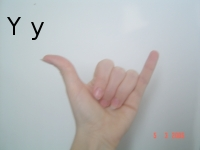
Y

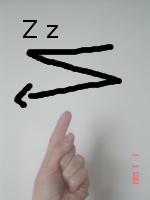
Z

These are largely similar to the letters of the American manual alphabet. A few letters (upward G, sideward M and N) are oriented differently, with the result that D and G depend on a difference in hand shape that has been lost from informal ASL, and N looks like an ASL H. Several letters (hitchhiker-thumb A, clawed E, splayed F, nodding P, etc.) have minor differences that suggest a different "accent"; the thumb on A makes it more distinct from S than is American A. Four letters are radically different: H (the ASL '8'/'horns' handshape), J (a swiveling Y rather than I), X (uses two fingers, like a flexed ASL V), and T (just like the French F, but with the thumb on the inside of the index finger instead of on the outside).
