= Nordic Council of the Deaf =

Nordic deaf advocacy organization

- Abbreviation: DNR (Danish, Norwegian, Swedish), KPN (Finnish)
- Formation: 1907; 119 years ago
- Founded at: Copenhagen, Denmark
- Type: Disability organization
- Purpose: Deaf advocacy
- Leader: Rotating; country holding the presidency changes every four years
- Subsidiaries: Nordic Deaf Youth Council

The Nordic Council of the Deaf is a non-partisan and non-religious association whose mission is to work and raise awareness of the linguistic and cultural interests of the deaf in the Nordic countries. It was founded in Copenhagen, Denmark, in 1907 and met irregularly until the 1950s. The organization changed its name to the Cooperation of the Nordic Associations of the Deaf in 1960, later becoming the Nordic Council of the Deaf in 1972.

The council's members are the respective national associations of the deaf in the Nordic countries:

- Denmark (Danish Deaf Association)
- Faroe Islands
- Finland (Finnish Association of the Deaf)
- Greenland
- Iceland (Icelandic Association of the Deaf)
- Norway (Norwegian Association of the Deaf)
- Sweden (Swedish National Association of the Deaf)

The council meets twice a year. Two representatives from each country attend the meetings. Member countries take turns holding the presidency for four years. Every four years, a cultural festival is organized and the host country is changed.

A key issue for the council is to work for equality and participation of the Nordic deaf in society, which can be realized when sign language has a strong position in society.

The organization views different national sign languages, which have been used for hundreds of years in the region, as an irreplaceable part of Nordic linguistic diversity.

The Nordic Deaf Youth Council is its sister organization.

== See also ==
- Danish sign language
- Deaf rights
- Finland-Swedish sign language
- Finnish sign language
- Icelandic sign language
  - Deafness in Iceland
- Norwegian sign language
- Swedish sign language
