= Nicaraguan Sign Language =

Deaf-community sign language

- Idioma de Señas de Nicaragua, ISN
- Native to: Nicaragua
- Region: The Managua region and spreading throughout the country
- Native speakers: 3,000 (1997)
- Language family: Deaf-community sign language: developed as a creole language from home and idioglossic sign, with the addition of an ASL-influenced manual alphabet

Language codes
- ISO 639-3: ncs
- Glottolog: nica1238
- ELP: Nicaraguan Sign Language

Nicaraguan Sign Language (ISN; Spanish: Idioma de Señas de Nicaragua) is a sign language developed by deaf children in several schools in Nicaragua.

== History ==
Before the 1970s, a deaf community largely socializing with and amongst each other was not present in Nicaragua. Deaf people were generally isolated from one another and mostly used simple home sign systems and gesture (mímicas) to communicate with their families and friends, though there were several cases of idioglossia among deaf siblings. The conditions necessary for a language to arise occurred in 1977 when a center for special education established a plan that was initially attended by 50 deaf children. The number of pupils at the school (in the Managua neighborhood of San Judas) then grew to 100 by 1979, the beginning of the Sandinista Revolution.

In 1980 a vocational school for deaf adolescents was opened in the Villa Libertad area of Managua. By 1983 more than 400 deaf pupils were enrolled in the two schools. Initially, the language plan emphasized spoken Spanish and lipreading, and the use of signs by teachers was limited to fingerspelling (using simple signs to sign the alphabet).

The plan achieved little success, with most pupils failing to grasp the concept of Spanish words. The children subsequently remained linguistically disconnected from their teachers, but the schoolyard, the street, and the school bus provided fertile ground for them to communicate with one another. By combining gestures and elements of their home-sign systems, a new language rapidly began to emerge. The "first-stage" language has been called Lenguaje de Signos Nicaragüense (LSN) and is still used by many who attended the school at the time.

Staff at the school, unaware of the development of this new language, saw the children's gesturing as mime and a failure to acquire Spanish. Unable to understand what the children were saying, they asked for outside help. In June 1986, the Nicaraguan Ministry of Education contacted Judy Kegl, an American Sign Language linguist from MIT. As Kegl and other researchers began to analyze the language they noticed that the young children had taken the language of the older children to a higher level of complexity, with verb agreement and other conventions of grammar. The more complex sign language is now known as Idioma de Señas de Nicaragua (ISN).

From the beginning of her research until Nicaraguan Sign Language was well established, Kegl carefully avoided introducing the sign languages that she knew, in particular American Sign Language, to the deaf community in Nicaragua. Critics argued a form of linguistic imperialism had been occurring internationally for decades, in which individuals would introduce ASL to populations of deaf people in other countries, often supplanting existing local sign languages. Kegl's policy was to document and study rather than to impose or change the language or its community. Whilst she did not interfere with deaf Nicaraguans gaining exposure to other sign languages, she did not introduce such opportunities. She has, however, documented contact and influences with other sign languages that have occurred since the 1990s. Critics, such as Felicia Ackerman, have taken issue with the ethics of isolating the Nicaraguan children.

Kegl's organization, Nicaraguan Sign Language Projects, helped establish a deaf school staffed entirely by deaf Nicaraguan teachers and has supported deaf Nicaraguans in attending and presenting at international conferences.

== Linguistics ==
ISN offers a rare opportunity to study the emergence of a new language. Before ISN, studies of the early development of languages had focused on creoles, which develop from the mixture of two (or more) distinct communities of fluent speakers. In contrast, ISN was developed by a group of young people with only non-conventional home sign systems and gestures.

Some linguists, such as Kegl and R. J. Senghas, view ISN’s development as proof that language acquisition is hard-wired inside the human brain. Steven Pinker, author of The Language Instinct, claims that "The Nicaraguan case is unique in history ... We've been able to see how it is that children—not adults—generate language, and we have been able to record it happening in great scientific detail. And it's the only time that we've seen a language being created out of thin air."

Since 1990, other researchers including Ann Senghas, Marie Coppola, Richard Senghas, Laura Polich, and Jennie Pyers, have begun to study and report on the development of this unique language and its community. Since then, whilst researchers have their interpretations of the events leading to the language and its development, all agree that to date, the phenomenon being studied is one of the richest sources of data on language emergence discovered.

== Structure ==
Bierma provides a good foundation to ISN structures. He takes as an example "rolling down". While a person may visualize this as one motion, ISN splits this action into two parts: manner and direction. These smaller parts allow for them to be rearranged to create different phrases. The most sophisticated speakers use an A-B-A speech pattern; in our example, this reflects the signs roll-down-roll, to note that the rolling down motion is continuous, not that the subject rolled and then descended.

=== Spatial modulation ===
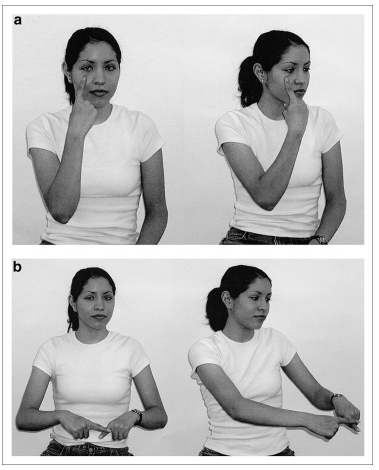
"See" (a) and "Pay" (b), produced in a neutral direction and spatially modulated to the signer's left

Spatial modulations are the building blocks of all sign languages studied to date. A neutrally placed sign is in front of the chest; however, a sign can be modulated, or directionally altered, to convey many grammatical changes.

Spatial modulations can perform functions including "indicating person or number; providing deictic, locative, or temporal information; or indicating grammatical relationships".

In the article written by Senghas and Coppola, they explore spatial modulation as it occurs in ISN. They found that this movement from the neutral space was much more common among signers who began learning at a younger age than their peers who did so when they were older. Taking this into consideration (as well as their studies on spatial modulations for indicating shared reference and the speed at which signers at different stages of learning signed), Senghas and Coppola determined that child learners are creating Nicaraguan Sign Language – they "changed the language as they learned it". The fact that students who began signing at a younger age use spatial modulation more often than their older peers, who began signing at ISN's conception, is indicative that the language matures as the younger cohorts make the grammar more complex. They go on to note that it is only when a language is not matured, such as with ISN, that language-learning abilities show their transformational and creative capacity.

In the signing space, the use of pointing to indicate referent identity has increased greatly since the 1980s. Points can serve a "pronoun-like function, coordinating with the spatial modulations to verbs, to indicate the argument structure of the sentence, and to co-index referents across discourse".

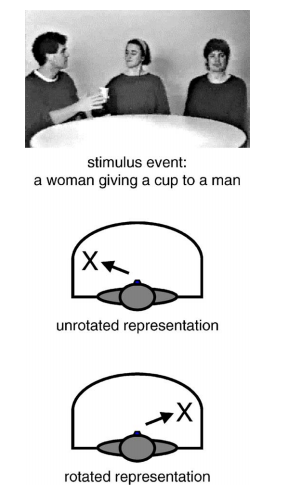
Illustration of unrotated and rotated representation of a giving event. The location is compared with the man's location in the event to determine the rotation of the representation.

Senghas and Coppola have noted that signers who learned ISN before the Extensive Contact Period (before 1983) were inconsistent in whether an event was represented as rotated or reflected (unrotated) in the signing space. If the signer was watching an event where a man on the signer's left gave an object to a woman on the signer's right, it was at random (when the signer reiterated the scene) whether or not the signer would use spatial modulation to mark left and right based on his view from in front of the scene or as if the signer were facing the same way as the actors in the scene.

Signers who began learning after 1983 were not inconsistent in that way. Across multiple signers and multiple scenes, signers would apply the same rotated representation. Senghas and Coppola suggested that this meant that "spatial modulations are being used as a shared grammatical element among this age cohort".

== Academic interpretation ==
=== When it became language ===
Researchers disagree regarding at what stage in the development of ISN it became a full-fledged language.

- Coppola argues that isolated family-signed systems in Nicaragua contained components that can be called linguistic (but that does not mean she equates home sign with language).
- Kegl argues that following an intermediate stage when deaf contact gesturers came together and developed a communication sufficient to make young children think their input was a language to be acquired, the first generation of young children acquired a language as complete and rich as any human language known to date; subsequent changes constitute an expected process of historical change.
- Senghas argues that once ISN came into being, it became more and more complex over successive cohorts of young acquirers.

=== Evidence for innate language capacities ===
William Stokoe, known by many as the father of American Sign Language linguistics, disagreed that the emergence of ISN is evidence of a language acquisition device. Stokoe also questions assertions that the language has emerged entirely without outside influence from, for example, Spanish or ASL. There is so far no final evidence available to resolve the controversy surrounding nativism v. cultural learning, and the dispute reaches far into theoretical linguistics, the approaches of which may conceptualize grammar in different and incompatible ways. Even if the evidence collected seems to indicate a lack of access to Spanish and ASL in the early emergence process, the possibility remains that the development of ISN is facilitated by the speaker's exposure to more general communicative strategies in early infancy.

Alternatives to theories proposing a language acquisition device have been presented by Michael Tomasello (among others). Tomasello argues that the process of acquiring a first language is boosted by non-linguistic communication, as in the establishment of joint intentional frames and in the understanding of communicative intentions.

In any case, once ISN came into being, like other languages, it actively engaged in contact with languages in its environment.

=== As "unwritable" ===
R. J. Senghas (1997) used the phrase "unspeakable, unwritable" language in the title of his dissertation to highlight the common misconception that those languages without a written form are not as "real" (a view often held by those who do not study indigenous languages). In a similar fashion, sign languages are often not given proper recognition because they are not spoken or written. (Senghas has never claimed that Nicaraguan Sign Language is unwritable, just that it was often thought of as such by those who do not study sign languages.)

Generally, the influence literacy has on the status of a language is also addressed in debates on the so-called "written language paradigm" in which it is acknowledged that the availability of written language to some extent must be considered as a culturally and historically dependent phenomenon. Tim Ingold, a British anthropologist, discussed these matters at some length in Perception of the Environment (2000), though he does not specifically deal with ISN.

Since 1996, however, Nicaraguans have been writing their language by hand and on a computer using SignWriting. There are now many texts written in Nicaraguan Sign Language, including three volumes of reading lessons in ISN, Spanish I and II (two levels of texts, workbooks, and primers), Cuentos Españoles (a collection of stories in Spanish with ISN glossaries), and a geography text.

== See also ==
- Deafness in Nicaragua
- Adamorobe Sign Language
- Al-Sayyid Bedouin Sign Language
- Kata Kolok
- Martha's Vineyard Sign Language
- Yucatec Maya Sign Language
