= Deafness in Nicaragua =

Hearing loss in the Central American country, and related topics

Nicaragua's total population is 6,000,000, but a reliable count of the number of deaf people in Nicaragua is difficult to obtain. In 2009, a law was passed in which Nicaraguan Sign Language (NSL) was named as the official language of deaf people in Nicaragua. NSL is a newer sign language that emerged less than 50 years ago when deaf children started attending school. Due to the country's lack of early childhood hearing screenings, hearing loss is often undetected and left untreated. Deaf and hard-of-hearing children often face language deprivation due to the lack of language input they experience until they enter school. There are many schools in different cities in Nicaragua; however, the majority of deaf children throughout the country are not attending school. Deaf and hard-of-hearing people also face struggles when finding employment opportunities. NSL isn't an endangered sign language, but the total number of people who use the language are under 10,000.

== Language emergence ==
Until the late 1970s, there was no deaf community in Nicaragua. Since there was no official deaf community, deaf children and deaf adults in Nicaragua rarely communicated or had interactions with each other. Since there were no interactions between the deaf, the deaf created their own home signs, which were different for each deaf person. In 1977, a special education elementary school opened in Managua, and then in 1981, a vocational school opened in Managua as well. These schools originally had about 50 deaf students enrolled, but by 1981, the number of deaf students grew to more than 200, and kept increasing over the years. The deaf students started hanging outside of school, and to communicate with each other, they created their own system of gestures. This system then developed into a form of sign language, which is now known as Nicaraguan Sign Language. As the sign language continued to be used, it got passed down to each new generation of students who enrolled in the schools. Nicaraguan Sign Language would classify as a deaf community sign language since it was created by deaf students who previously had no interactions with other deaf people until the schools opened. NSL is the first case where scientists were able to study a language from the time of its emergence, making it scientifically important due to the information that can be learned and utilized.

== Significant organizations ==
=== National Association of the Deaf (Asociación Nacional de Sordos de Nicaragua) ===
The National Association of the Deaf is Nicaragua's national deaf-led association that was founded in 1986. The association is a national member of the World Federation of the Deaf, and all of the board members are deaf. The association's headquarters are in Managua, and it offers academic support, vocational training, classes in NSL, and NSL interpreter training.

=== Advocacy Network for Nicaraguan Deaf Education (ANNDE) ===
The organization's mission is to provide deaf and hard of hearing children education, support families who are learning NSL, educate others about the needs of deaf and hard of hearing children in Nicaragua, and "empower advocates and professionals to support them." One of their accomplishments is opening up a school in Nicaragua for deaf children where both NSL and written Spanish is used. It is unknown if anyone on their board is deaf or hard of hearing. The organizations relies on sponsors for funding, and awareness of the organization is spread through social media.

=== Mayflower Medical Outreach ===
Mayflower Medical Outreach is an organization based in Oklahoma City, Oklahoma, US and their mission is to "improve the lives of hearing-impaired Nicaraguans" and improve ENT (ear, nose, and throat) medicine, the field of audiology, and deaf education. Their audiology program involves providing audiological tests to diagnose hearing loss, and providing hearing aid fittings and batteries for the hearing aids. Their Otolaryngology program is where ENT doctors and nurses from Mayflower Medical Outreach go to Nicaragua to perform cochlear implant surgeries for children. For deaf education, the organization opened up a school in a rural area of Nicaragua and education is provided in NSL. They have another program called the International Humanitarian Hearing Aid Purchasing Program where they provide aids to humanitarian and not-for-profit organizations. The hearing aids aren't allowed to be sold for profit. It is unknown if anyone of their directors of operations are deaf or hard of hearing. Funding for the school comes in various ways including sponsors and funds from a bakery they own in Nicaragua.

=== Bainbridge-Ometepe Sister Islands Association ===
This association started in 2009 and is based in Bainbridge Island, Washington, US. The organization has programs for deaf, blind, and special needs children. The organization helps deaf students attend Escuela Hogar para Niños Discapacitado (Boarding School for Handicapped Children) in Ciudad Darío, Nicaragua, by sponsoring them. It is unknown if any of the officers, directors, or board members are deaf or hard of hearing.

=== Tío Antonio Social Center ===
The Tío Antonio Social Center was founded in 2007 by Antonio Prieto Buñuel, and is legally registered in Spain as a non-governmental organization. Its mission is to create employment opportunities for people with disabilities. The organization founded a café in Nicaragua called Café de las Sonrisas which is managed completely by deaf people. The organization also offers free sign language classes and are taught by specialized educators.

== Early hearing detection and intervention ==
Nicaragua doesn't have a national screening program to identify children with hearing loss. There are also no national early intervention programs or services for deaf children. As a result, profound sensorineural hearing loss is often undetected, and therefore untreated.

== Language deprivation ==
A census taken in Nicaragua in 2009, showed that 10.1% of the disabled population were deaf and hard of hearing, which is about 12,783 people. In Nicaragua, it is rare for deaf adults to have deaf children, so very few deaf children have a deaf relative. Because of this, most deaf children don't learn NSL until they enter school. However, most deaf children in Nicaragua don't have access to special education. Research has shown that language is best learned between the ages of 0 and 5 years old, due to the brain having high plasticity during this time period. Since deaf and hard of hearing children in Nicaragua don't learn NSL until they enter school, which is past this age period, they experience language deprivation due to delay of language input.

In Nicaragua, many hearing people use gestures without talking. The hearing culture has many established gestures with fixed meanings. Typical hearing people aren't told to not use gestures with deaf and hard-of-hearing people. Homesigning is also still used in Nicaragua, with deaf children homesigners using some of the same gestures of their parents. A study done by Gary Morgan and Judy Kegel focused on the development of the theory of mind by testing the false belief abilities of children and young adults who received language input at different ages. There were 22 participants who were all NSL signers and between the ages of 7 and 39. The participants were split into two groups, an early learner group who were exposed to NSL before 10 years old, and a late learner group who were exposed to NSL after 10 years of age. The early learners outperformed the late learners in the two false belief tests, with only some later learners passing the two false belief tests. Morgan and Kegel concluded that creating a theory of mind without adequate language input shows that reasoning about, or understanding the nature of false beliefs, is difficult. The results of the later NSL learners shows that because they went many years without learning a language, they had more difficulty understanding other people's mental state.

== Primary and secondary education ==
NSL has been recognized by the government as the official language of deaf children in Nicaragua. In Nicaragua, there is an increase in the use of "inclusion education," which has a goal of educating deaf children together with hearing children with necessary support such as interpreters and signing teachers. However, lack of finances, teaching expertise, and an overall unawareness in the country as how to best educate deaf children prevents full implementation of this policy. In these inclusive education classrooms, deaf children often do not have proper access to communication, which delays their learning.

There are 25 public schools of special education located in various municipalities. The school days in these schools usually last 3.5 hours. Recently, more paid teaching positions are offered to deaf signing teachers. But, the majority of teachers in these schools are hearing and only have basic signing skills. There are at least five private schools/programs for deaf children: Escuela Cristiana de Sordos Isaías 29:18 (Note: Isaiah 29:18, KJV: "And in that day shall the deaf hear the words of the book, and the eyes of the blind shall see out of obscurity, and out of darkness.") (the Christian Deaf School) in Managua, El Albergue in Jinotega, the Hogar Escuela in Ciudad Darío, the Ann Coyne School for the Deaf in León, and Los Pipitos in San Juan del Sur.

Until recently, deaf education was only provided up to 6th grade. Many deaf children in the country would repeat grades until they reached 16 years old, which is when they would graduate from elementary school. There are currently two secondary education programs in Managua, one in Estelí, and one in Ciudad Darío. Deaf and hard-of-hearing students typically complete high school by attending classes all day on Saturdays for many years. These classes are taught in spoken Spanish with NSL interpretation.

There are about 3,051 deaf students between the ages of 5 and 14 years old living in Managua. There is a maximum number of 300 deaf students attending school in Managua, which is a 3% rate of attendance for deaf students in urban areas. Nationally, about 1,040 deaf children attend school throughout the whole country. The estimated number of all deaf children in Nicaragua, between the ages of 5 and 14 years old is 18,875. This means only 5% of deaf children in Nicaragua attend school.

== Higher education ==
There are about 25 deaf students in Nicaragua who are either studying at a university or have already completed their post-secondary degree. The number of deaf students who are attending university has increased over the years, mostly in the cities of Managua and Estelí. However, these students represent a very small percentage of the deaf population, as the rate for hearing people attending university is only 3%. For deaf students, getting access to NSL interpreting services is more difficult, and deaf students often choose to enter the same degree programs to decrease the costs for getting interpreters, which the students and their families paid for.

Deaf and hard-of-hearing students who want to pursue teaching degrees face barriers in accessing the higher education needed to receive their teaching certifications. One reason for the lack of interpreters is there are very few interpreter training programs and they have a limited capacity. Another reason is there is a lack of necessary materials for these interpreters to use to practice their skills. These interpreter training programs need materials such as video-recorded texts to practice translating, but these texts have to be made locally to cover the range of topics needed for education. Overall, having more interpreters available for deaf college students' education would "directly impact the literary success" of deaf and hard-of-hearing students in the future. Deaf teachers are more likely to be the most fluent in sign language and would be able to more effectively teach future deaf students, which would improve their literacy.

== Employment ==
Underemployment among the overall population in Nicaragua is very high. The deaf and hard of hearing struggle to find jobs even when they have completed their primary education, which is required to get a job, or their secondary education. Skilled jobs are only available to deaf and hard-of-hearing people under the age of around 45, as access to education for the deaf and hard of hearing is still a recent development in Nicaragua's history. The majority of deaf people are unemployed or work by selling goods or food on the street, or they work domestic jobs.

== Healthcare ==
According to Nicaragua's third periodic report to the Committee on the Rights of Persons with Disabilities, there are eight audiology centers in eight different cities throughout Nicaragua. More than 9,000 audiometric and tympanometric tests have been conducted at these centers. More than 5,000 deaf and hard-of-hearing people have been issued hearing aids. In 14 local healthcare systems, there are 22 ear, nose, and throat specialists, and medical staff are said to be receiving training in proper ear and hearing care.

Early newborn hearing screenings are starting to be introduced to identify newborns who may need early and specialized care for hearing problems that are detected. Typically, cochlear implant services are provided by international medical teams. Nationally, modules developed by the World Health Organization provided basic, intermediate, and advanced training in primary ear and hearing care.

Concerning the topic of HIV/AIDS, posters in sign language on HIV prevention have been printed, and there have been forums and training sessions focused on prevention of HIV for disabled people, including the deaf and hard of hearing.

== Language preservation and revitalization ==
NSL has a score of 5 to 6a on the Expanded Graded Intergenerational Disruption Scale meaning it is a stable language. However, the language has less than 10,000 speakers.

One major threat to the preservation of the language is deaf and hard-of-hearing children rarely get any exposure to NSL until they enter school. This is due to the fact that deafness rarely gets passed down in families, so many deaf and hard-of-hearing children in Nicaragua have hearing parents. However, the majority of deaf and hard-of-hearing children aren't attending school, and therefore don't have access to NSL.
