= Ann Senghas =

Developmental psychologist

- Occupations: Professor of Psychology, Director of the Language Acquisition and Development Research Laboratory
- Awards: National Academies of Science and Engineering, Frontiers of Science Fellow, 2000

Academic background
- Education: B.A., Smith College
- Alma mater: Ph.D., Massachusetts Institute of Technology

Academic work
- Sub-discipline: Language acquisition, Cognitive development, Language evolution, Historical linguistics, Sign Language, Gesture
- Institutions: Barnard College - Columbia University

Ann Senghas is an American developmental psychologist known for her research on the emergence and development of Nicaraguan Sign Language. Senghas is Professor of Psychology at Barnard College, Columbia University, where she directs the Language Acquisition and Development Research Laboratory.

Senghas is a fellow of the Association for Psychological Science. She was a Frontiers of Science Fellow of the National Academies of Sciences (2000), and was a recipient of the prestigious Mary I. Bunting Fellowship from the Radcliffe Institute for Advanced Study (2014–2015).

== Biography ==
Senghas pursued her undergraduate degree at Smith College in Northampton, Massachusetts, graduating cum laude in 1986 with a Bachelor of Arts in French Studies. She continued her education at the Massachusetts Institute of Technology, earning her Ph.D. in Brain and Cognitive Sciences in 1995 under the mentorship of Steven Pinker. Her dissertation, Children's Contribution to the Birth of Nicaraguan Sign Language, explored how deaf children developed the structure of a new language. In 1993, during her time at MIT, Senghas was awarded Angus MacDonald Award for Excellence in Teaching, Massachusetts Institute of Technology.

Senghas began her postdoctoral research under the mentorship of Elissa Newport and Ted Supalla in 1995 at the University of Rochester's Center for the Sciences of Language, where she investigated the syntactic and morphological development of Nicaraguan Sign Language over its first two generations. She also examined the grammatical structures of adult homesign systems in Nicaragua.

She served as a 1998 research staff member at the Max Planck Institute in the Netherlands for Psycholinguistics, contributing to studies on spatial reference and gesture and her own field data from research on Nicaraguan Sign Language.

Since 1999, Senghas has worked at Barnard College as a Tow associate professor, department chair, and director of the Language Acquisition and Development Research Laboratory focusing on language emergence and change. Under her directorship, the LADR lab has been supported by the National Institutes of Health/National Institute on Deafness and Other Communication Disorders since 2002. In 2014, she was named a Radcliffe Institute fellow; building on her work with Nicaraguan Sign Language, she also investigated other emerging systems, such as home signs and village sign languages, aiming to uncover the universal elements of human experience that drive language development. Throughout her tenure at Columbia, she has been celebrated for her impactful contributions to both the academic and local communities. Her achievements include being honored with the Recognition of Faculty Who Made a Difference award by the Barnard Seniors of Color in both 2002 and 2005, as well as receiving the Faculty Recognition award from the New York Higher Education Opportunity Program in 2002.

Outside of academia, Senghas has been a visiting scholar and lecturer at institutions such as Harvard University, Boston University, and Wellesley College, and she has delivered numerous keynote addresses and lectures on language creation and development.

== Research ==
Senghas’s research focuses on how language emerges and develops, particularly examining the influence of individuals and communities on linguistic systems. She is known for her pioneering research on Nicaraguan Sign Language, a sign language that developed spontaneously among deaf children in Nicaragua in the late 20th century. Her studies have offered insights into the cognitive and social underpinnings of language creation and evolution.

Senghas's research centers on longitudinal studies of Nicaraguan Sign Language, tracking its development over many years. Nicaraguan Sign Language started to form in the 1970s when deaf children were first brought together in educational settings. These children, who had previously depended on home-sign systems, began to develop a collective method of communication. Senghas's research has demonstrated that although the first cohort of signers utilized basic gestures, later cohorts of children refined and expanded these gestures into a fully-fledged linguistic system.

A finding of her research is that children were instrumental in evolving Nicaraguan Sign Language into a structured language. She showed that second- and third-generation users of Nicaraguan Sign Language brought in consistent grammatical rules, such as spatial modulation, to express relationships between subjects and verbs. This development underscores how young learners innovate and systematize language exposure, evolving it into a more sophisticated framework over time.

Senghas’s research emphasizes the relationship between cognitive skills and social contexts in the development of language. She has investigated how the human brain's natural inclination for recognizing patterns and symbolic reasoning allows for the formation of organized language systems, even without formal education. Her research indicates that the formation of Nicaraguan Sign Language was influenced not just by individual cognitive functions but also by the collective interactions among its speakers This highlights the significance of community and social factors in the progression of language.

Senghas has explored the phonological systems of Nicaraguan Sign Language beyond just grammar. Her studies investigate how users created consistent handshapes, movements, and locations to establish unique linguistic units. She has discovered patterns in how Nicaraguan Sign Language users convey meaning through various combinations of these elements, similar to how spoken languages utilize sounds to create words. This research has expanded the comprehension of how phonological systems can emerge in newly developed languages.

Senghas’s results contribute to discussions about the origins of language, providing support for the idea that languages can develop spontaneously when conditions are favorable. Furthermore, they contest conventional theories of language acquisition by demonstrating that children actively construct linguistic structure rather than just passively absorbing it. Her studies also have relevance for comprehending language disorders, as they illuminate the processes involved in language development and its evolution.

== Representative publications ==
- Senghas, A., & Coppola, M. (2001). Children creating language: How Nicaraguan Sign Language acquired a spatial grammar. Psychological Science, 12(4), 323-328. https://doi.org/10.1111/1467-9280.00359
- Senghas, A. (2003). Intergenerational influence and ontogenetic development in the emergence of spatial grammar in Nicaraguan Sign Language. Cognitive Development, 18(4), 511-531. https://doi.org/10.1016/j.cogdev.2003.09.006
- Senghas, A., Kita, S., & Ozyurek, A. (2004). Children creating core properties of language: Evidence from an emerging sign language in Nicaragua. Science, 305(5691), 1779-1782. https://doi.org/10.1126/science.1100199
- Pyers, J. E., & Senghas, A. (2009). Language promotes false-belief understanding: Evidence from learners of a new sign language. Psychological science, 20(7), 805-812. https://doi.org/10.1111/j.1467-9280.2009.02377.x
- Pyers, J. E., Shusterman, A., Senghas, A., Spelke, E. S., & Emmorey, K. (2010). Evidence from an emerging sign language reveals that language supports spatial cognition. Proceedings of the National Academy of Sciences, 107(27), 12116-12120. https://doi.org/10.1073/pnas.0914044107
