= Deafness in Norway =

Official estimates place the number of individuals in the Norwegian deaf and hard of hearing (DHH) community from 4,000 or 5,000 to 16,500. The main, and only officially recognized sign language as of January 1, 2022, being Norwegian Sign Language, abbreviated as NSL or NTS.

Within Norway, DHH individuals are granted rights to deaf education in primary and lowers secondary years although there are no longer traditional schools for the deaf. Under the constitution, all individuals are equal under the law and not to be discriminated against which includes disabled communities. Early Intervention systems and newborn hearing screenings are mandated with 95% of infants receiving screening.

== Human and civil rights for DHH People in Norway ==
=== The UN CRPD ===
The UN CRPD is an international convention aiming to "promote, protect and ensure the full and equal enjoyment of all human rights and fundamental freedoms by all persons with disabilities..." Norway signed the UN Convention of the Rights of Persons with Disabilities (CRPD) in 2007 moving to ratify it 6 years later in 2013. According to the UN Treaty Body database, Norway has not submitted to the optional protocol and claims that it is "under review" as of 2015 as mentioned in their most recent Country Report filed in July 2015. Norway's most recent List of issues as filed 3 years later in October 2018.

- Sign language rights (Articles 2, 21.b, 21.3, 23.3, and 24.3b)
- Deaf culture and linguistic identity (Article 30.4)
- Bilingual education (Article 24.1, 24.3b, 24.4)
- Lifelong learning (Article 5, 24.5, and 27)
- Accessibility (Article 9 and 21)
- Equal employment opportunities (Article 27)
- Equal participation (Article 5, 12, 20, 23, 24, 29)

=== Norways' State Party Reports(s) ===
==== Sign language right ====
According to the Country Report, Norway recognizes the Norwegian Sign language (NSL) as a separate language in its own right. The country further protects the use of sign language through assigning freedom of expression and opinion to all people including those who are disabled stating that "By means of various necessary measures, such as the use of new technology, the authorities try to make it possible for everyone to exercise this right."

Within the education system, Children in primary and lower secondary schools who know Norwegian sign language as their first language or prove to require such instruction as determined by an expert's assessment, are entitled to instruction in sign language.

==== Deaf culture and linguistic identity ====
There is limited information within the country Report regarding the support of DHH culture or linguistic identity however, it is mention that disabled individuals must have opportunities for participation in social integration that are equal to others.

Norway does offer a separate support scheme in order to provide subsidies for holiday and welfare programs. Such programs are run by voluntary organizations for persons with disabilities.

The only named aspect of DHH culture mentioned within Norway's CRPD is known as The Congregations of the Deaf. This is the church of Norway's congregations for the deaf and severely hearing impaired who host their services in NSL and "contribute to the design of sign language resource material that can be used by parishes to facilitate church services, religious instruction for children, etc."

==== Bilingual education ====
Per Article 109 of the Norwegian Constitution, "everyone has the right to education," including those with disabilities.

Norway has implemented The Education Act which stipulates that the entire educational system has to provide equal quality to all and must be altered in accordance to each child's capabilities and personal circumstance. The entitlement to instruction in sign language is specifically mentioned within this act for kindergarteners and children in primary and lower secondary school and those who have NSL as their first language or have proved to need such instruction.

For particularly young students, The Kindergarten Act grants disabled children the right to priority admission to a kindergarten. Furthermore, within municipal kindergartens, entitlement is granted for such children to access personal accommodations in order to guarantee activity opportunities and equitable growth and progression.

Young individuals entitled to upper secondary education, who identify sign language as their first language or who, according to an expert assessment, need such an education, are also entitled to receive this education in sign language as well as in a sign language environment or through the implementation of an interpreter in a "mainstream upper secondary school." It is stated in the CPRD that sign language environment refers to schools that provide adapted education through sign language for students with hearing impairments.

==== Lifelong learning ====
Beyond the primary and secondary education systems, The State Educational Loan Fund provides financial assistance for students with disabilities pursuing higher education. The fund is composed of a fixed monthly sum intended to cover the accommodation and transportation expenses that students with disabilities may face. Norwegian law states that specialized treatment is allowed so long as there is an established and legitimate objective, the treatment is imperative to achieve this objective, and does not negatively effect the individual involved to a disproportionate extent.

==== Accessibility ====
Within the Norwegian CRPD little information is given pertaining to accessibility for the DHH community. The Norwegian Broadcasting Corporation broadcasts their programs in sign language on weekdays.

Pertaining to music, seven orchestras were reported to have installed audio induction loops and/or additional equipment to assist those with hearing-impairments.

Within the niche of transportation, there are many requirements and assets stated within the CRPD that serve disabled individuals. Most applicable to those within the DHH community is the Norwegian Maritime Directorate, which features requirements of universal design for access to ships through the usage of signage, communication and announcements, alarm systems and supplementary requirements to ensure mobility on board ships. Sufficient singage being most useful to those who are deaf or hard of hearing

==== Equal employment opportunities ====
Within the Norwegian Constitution, equality and the prohibition of discrimination are addressed in Article 98, which states “All people are equal under the law. No human being must be subject to unfair or disproportionate differential treatment.” It is stated that this includes people with disabilities and that as a collective they are to be granted priority within the labour market. In addition to this status, they are also within their right to receive adaptations of the workplace and assistive technologies. The CRPD reports that with the combined adaptation, attentive follow-up, and subsidies for the time-limited wage, disabled individuals have proven to be effectively assisted in their entrance to the labour market.

Article 110 of the Constitution demands that the state must generate conditions in which anyone able to work is also able to earn a living through such work and those who are unable to provide for themselves are entitled to state support.

It is reported that the Norwegian employment rate among those with disabilities is approximately 43 per cent with that of the whole population being about 74 per cent. The difference in employment rates between the two groups is severest among ages 40–59 and the smallest among the youngest

==== Equal participation ====
In Norway, municipal or county authorities are required to ensure that disabled individuals are guaranteed "open, broad-based, and accessible" participation in efforts on matters of particular importance to those with disabilities.

Article 98 of the Constitution establishes that all people are equal under the law, possess legal capacity and are holders of rights, and that any individual of the age of majority has the lawful ability to act.

== Sign languages used in Norway ==
=== NSL legal status ===
The primary and only officially recognized sign language spoken in Norway is Norwegian Sign Language which was legally recognizes by the Norwegian Language Act on January first of 2022.

Other names for the language include NSL, NTS, Norsk Tegnspråk, and Norsk Teiknspråk and the language has been used since approximately 1825 when the first deaf school in Norway was founded.

NSL has an estimated 2,500 native speakers within the DHH community and it is an indigenous, minority language classified as a deaf-community sign language. NSL has a language vitality score of 5 which is "developing".

=== Relation to Malagasy Sign Language ===
NSL is said to be closely related to the sign language of Madagascar, MSL.

Although the cause for such a close correlation it is not yet factually determined, speculations include NSL influencing MSL through the creation of schools for the deaf by Norwegian Lutheran missionaries beginning in 1950, direct borrowing of language, borrowing from a mutual source language, or simply being a coincidental occurrence.

== Screening and intervention ==
=== Universal Newborn Hearing Screening (UNHS) ===
As of 2008, newborn hearing screenings (NHS) have been mandated in Norway with a total of 95 percent of newborns getting screened. Of this percentage, 5.3 percent are referred for a diagnostic follow-up and zero percent are lost to follow-up.

For every 1000 babies, two are confirmed to have permanent childhood hearing loss and the average age at which this diagnosis is given for those who received the screening in their infancy is 5 months. As for those who were not screened as infants, the average age at which this diagnosis is provided is not reported .

=== Early intervention ===
In Norway, early childhood intervention programs are some of the highest quality of care found globally, going beyond the common aim of improving educational success and looking to support that in society and citizenship as well. Many Norwegian ECI services are organized at community level and are highly subsidized. Oftentimes, parents are responsible for paying 10 to 15 percent of the costs with fees being waived for very poor families.

The Norwegian Association for Otorhinolaryngology Head and Neck Surgery began developing what is known as the Norwegian Hearing Register for Children (NHRC) in 2019, with its aim being to improve outcomes for all children through providing a high-quality screening program, safe and effective assessment, as well as family focused early intervention (FCEI) for deaf children. In 2014 an evaluation of the program revealed that there were significant differences in quality of FCEI geographically resulting in the implementation of national guidelines for NHS and the habilitation of hearing impaired children of 0–3 years.

==== Hearing technology and resource access ====
As Norwegian audiological services are governmentally subsidized, hearing aid fittings and equipment are kept moderately priced. It is reported that the initial barrier to uptake a hearing aid is reduced when treatment and the hearing aid is state funded instead however, such this funding is not necessarily highly significant for later use of hearing aids. In terms of Cochlear implant technologies and their accessibility, there is one hospital within Norway that performs Cochlear implantations in children and that is the Oslo University Hospital. This poses a barrier for any children or families interested in implants but lack access or travel capabilities to this hospital.

The 1990s were a golden age for NSL and sign language teaching. During this time in addition to many other development, parents of DHH children were presented with the opportunity to receive 40 weeks of sign language training through "See My Language", a new program at the time.

==== Early intervention after Newborn Hearing Screening ====
In Norway, newborns who do not pass their NHS are to receive a "comprehensive audiological evaluation" by no later than 3 months old and appropriate intervention through hearing technology and family-centered early intervention are to be initiated before half a year of age. These national benchmarks are important for early access to ideal language and learning and represent the importance of rapid identification and intervention, however, due to the fact that a national information system for monitoring the quality standards has not yet been developed, there is a lack of information about resources such as the quality of NHS, outpatient re-screening, and audiological follow ups. This lack of structure can result in treatments based on professionals’ preferences as opposed to fact-based medicine.

== Education for DHH community ==
The very first traditional school for the deaf in Norway was established in 1825, with sign language as the language of instruction. It was not until the 1990s that Norway saw a "golden age" for NSL and its teaching. During this decade, Sign Language Studies and Sign Language Interpreting were established within universities, DHH children gained the right to sign language education, and parents were granted the ability to attend 40 weeks of sign language training through the "See My Language" program. Notably, in 1991 a revision to the NSL curriculum enabled students to opt for a "Deaf" curriculum within certain subjects.

According to an official government report, an estimated 267 DHH Norwegian students received education in NSL for the 2022/2023 academic year in accordance with the Education Act. It is also estimated that the majority-137 of these students are the only student or one of two in their school, that learn or are taught in NSL. The majority of the DHH children ( a reported 69-73%) attended mainstream schools as there are no longer any traditional deaf schools in Norway. An expansion to the NSL curriculum was made in 1993 implementing NSL as a subject which built upon the national curriculum from 1987 that had the aim to make deaf students bilingual. The parts of the general curriculum created pointedly for children who receive their education in sign language, is explicitly made for those who are hearing impaired. The implementation of this bilingual education curriculum marked a shift in which all deaf specialized state schools were closed and the students moved into mainstream schools.

In Norway, there is low requirement for DHH teacher competencies. The Norwegian government expects that teachers of DHH children have a knowledge in NSL equal to 6 months of full-time study for grades 1–7 and 12 months for grades 8–10 however, the majority of teachers do not possess prior knowledge in NSL before entering the courses. The government does not appoint specifications for the expected knowledge in NSL for preschool teachers.

DHH education is regulated and funded by the government, and deaf schools and education are public and free.

=== The Education Act ===
The Education Act of 1998 states that “pupils who have sign language as their first language […], have the right to primary and lower secondary instruction both in the use of sign language and through the medium of sign language” and Norwegian Law grants all citizens the right to education accessible in their neighborhood which extends to the DHH community. In 2016, the right to education in NSL began to include preschool children through the Act on Day Care Institutions however, it does not feature the ties to a hearing loss that is incorporated in the Education Act. Through the Education Act, major changes were made for the DHH community in Norway pertaining to education such as implementing a training program for hearing parents with DHH children to learn NSL. Parents may receive 40 weeks of training during each the first 16 years of their child's life.

=== Literacy rates ===
Data on literacy rates for DHH students is not readily available or accessible. The general Norwegian literacy rate is 100%, making them one of the 9 countries around the world to achieve this statistic.

=== Access to interpretation ===
As per the National Insurance Act in 1997, DHH individuals have a right to interpreting services. Under this act interpreting is defined as a benefit “for improving the ability to work and the ability to function in everyday life”.

=== Higher education ===
The amount of DHH students enrolled in universities has risen significantly over the past twenty years however the Norwegian universities’ formal responsibility to promote inclusion is not regarded as a legal demand for these institutions and is more so manifested as an appeal to individual lecturers.
