= Danish Sign Language family =

Sub-language family of sign languages

Danish Sign Language Family
- West Scandinavian Sign
- Geographic distribution: Denmark, Norway, Iceland, Madagascar
- Ethnicity: Diverse; Deaf populations
- Linguistic classification: French Sign: Danish Sign Language Family
- Subdivisions: Danish Sign Language; Norwegian Sign Language & Malagasy Sign Language; Icelandic Sign Language

Language codes
- Glottolog: west2993 (West Scandinavian Sign)

The Danish Sign Language family comprises three languages: Danish Sign Language, Norwegian Sign Language (including Malagasy Sign Language) and Icelandic Sign Language. It itself is a sub-language family within the larger French Sign Language family.

Wittmann (1991) places Danish Sign in the French Sign Language family, although being also influenced by local pidgin Scandinavian Sign, which also influenced Swedish sign.

Ethnologue reports that Danish Sign Language is largely mutually intelligible with Swedish Sign, though Wittmann places DSL in the French Sign Language family and Swedish Sign in the British Sign Language family.

Danish Sign Language family tree

French Sign (c. 1760–present) | local/home sign
Danish Sign (c. 1800–present)
Faroese Sign (c. 1960–present) | Greenlandic Sign (c. 1950–present) | Icelandic Sign (c. 1910–present) | Norwegian Sign (c. 1820–present)
Malagasy Sign (c. 1950–present)
