= Valerie Sutton =

American dancer and inventor (born 1951)

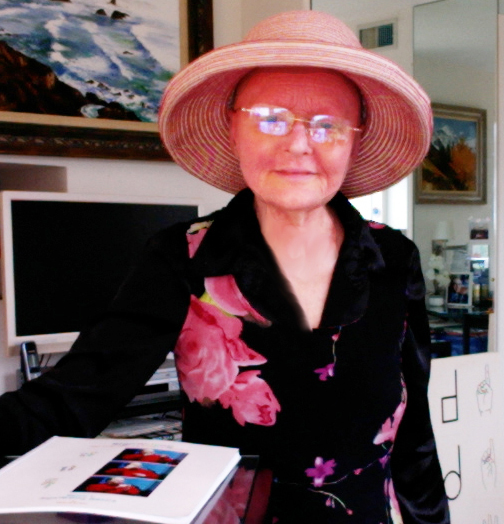
- Born: Valerie Sutton; February 22, 1951 (age 75); Manhattan, New York City
- Occupations: Developer, Dancer
- Relatives: Pam (sister)

Valerie Sutton (born February 22, 1951) is an American developer of movement notation and a former dancer.

== Early life ==
She was born in the borough of Manhattan, in New York City, the daughter of a physicist father and a poet/model mother. She has an older sister Pam, a doctor of medicine.

At the age of six months, she moved with her family to Corning, New York, where her father became a physicist. She lived in Corning until the age of eight years, and then moved to Corona del Mar, a part of Newport Beach, California. She spent the rest of her childhood in Corona del Mar, and as an adult moved to the San Diego, California area, where she has since lived. Her current home is in the San Diego suburb of La Jolla.

== Developed ==
In California, she credits the influence of Disney animation, as well as the theater and dance environment of Hollywood for directing her interest toward movement.

She developed the system known as Sutton Movement Writing (lately also entitled the International Movement Writing Alphabet (the IMWA), subdivided into five sections:

1. DanceWriting, which records dance choreography
2. SignWriting, which records signed languages
3. MimeWriting, which records classic mime and gesture
4. SportsWriting, which records such activities as gymnastics, ice skating, skateboarding and karate
5. ScienceWriting, which records physical therapy, body language, animal movements, and other forms of movement

The two forms of Sutton Movement Writing that have been most widely adopted are DanceWriting and SignWriting.

== Becoming a dancer ==
DanceWriting was first developed in 1966, when Sutton was only 15, training as a professional ballet dancer. She invented a stick figure notation for her own personal use. Four years later she went to Copenhagen, Denmark to train with the Royal Danish Ballet. Over the next two years she applied her system to recording the historic ballet steps of the RDB, which were in danger of being forgotten from lack of recording. The first DanceWriting textbook, Sutton Movement Shorthand, The Classical Ballet Key, Key One, was produced in December 1973. Within a year, it became outdated as Sutton improved her system. In the fall of 1974, by special invitation, she taught her system to the members of the RDB.

In 1974, articles about Sutton's DanceWriting system came to the attention of Lars van der Leith, a sign language researcher, and others who worked with him at the Audiologopædisk Forskningsgruppe of the University of Copenhagen, and they asked for a demonstration. As a result, van der Leith and his colleagues asked Sutton to develop a version of her movement notation adapted to the recording of sign languages. As a result, SignWriting was developed; it has been used for writing not only Danish Sign Language, but the private sign language of a deaf South Pacific islander (in 1975), and American Sign Language.

== Center for Sutton Movement Writing ==
In 1974, Sutton founded the Center for Sutton Movement Writing, a non-profit organization to promote the development and use of Sutton Movement Writing, most notably SignWriting.

CSMW published and distributed educational content – including SignWriting books, videos, and software – to benefit Deaf communities worldwide.

The organization was closed in 2020, after 46 years of operation. Sutton is now retired, and contributes to SignWriting in her free time.

== Wikimedia involvement ==
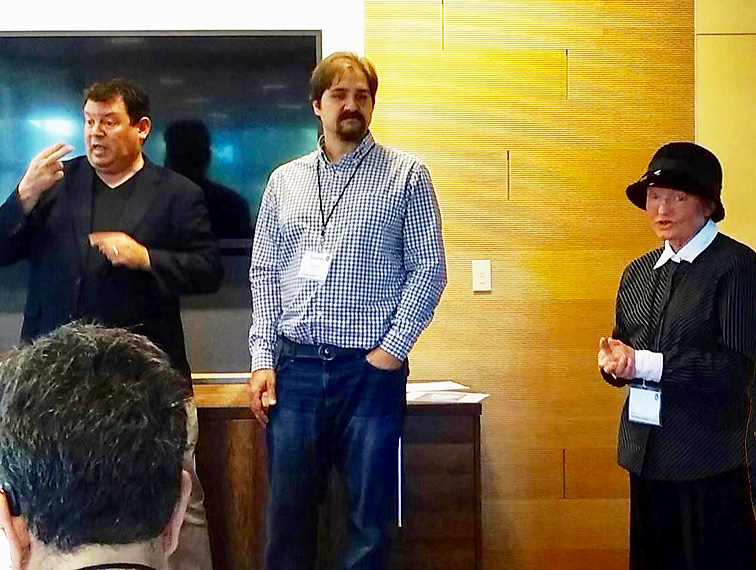
Valerie Sutton on the right, with Stephen E Slevinski Jr in the middle, at the NA Wiki Conference 2016

Valerie Sutton was part of the ASL Wikipedia presentation at the North American Wiki Conference in 2016. The presentation "Writing the American Sign Language Wikipedia on Incubator" involved 3 Deaf editors, Valerie Sutton, and Stephen E Slevinski Jr, along with two interpreters.

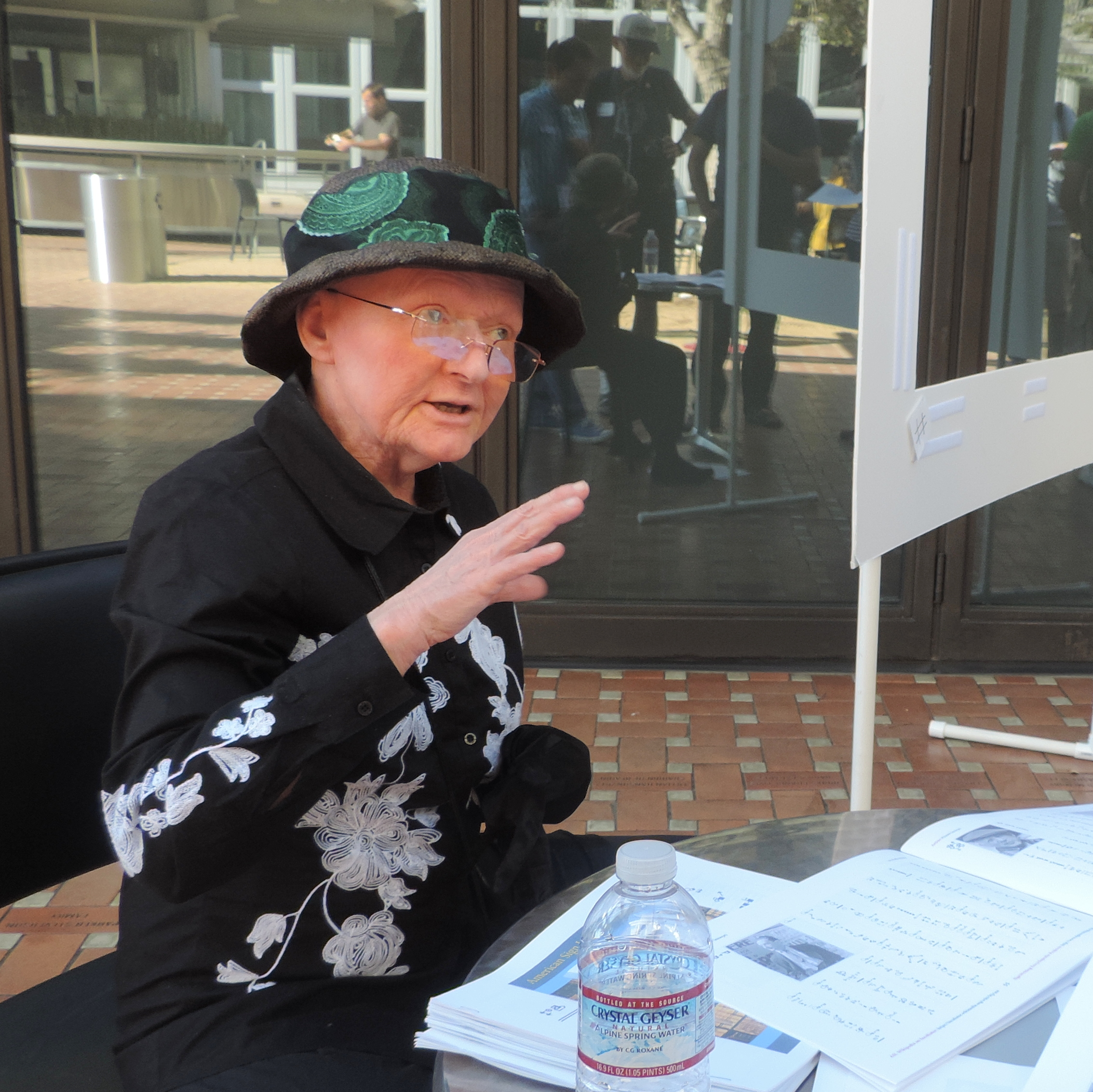
Valerie Sutton explaining the American Sign Language Wikipedia during NA Wiki Conference 2016

During the 2016 conference, Valerie Sutton explained the importance of the American Sign Language Wikipedia. She handed out several copies of the "ASL Wikipedia Excerpt booklet".
