= Malagasy Sign Language =

Sign language used in Madagascar

- Madagascar Sign Language Tenin'ny Tanana Malagasy
- Native to: Madagascar
- Language family: French Sign: Danish Sign; Norwegian Sign; Malagasy Sign Language

Language codes
- ISO 639-3: mzc
- Glottolog: mada1271

The Malagasy Sign Language (Malagasy: Tenin'ny Tanana malagasy, abbreviated TTM) is a sign language used for communication among deaf people in Madagascar. An estimated 110,000 to 170,000 people (or 1% of the population of Madagascar) are deaf. Malagasy Sign Language is similar to Norwegian Sign Language because the first deaf school in Madagascar was founded in 1960 by the Malagasy Lutheran Church with the assistance of a number of Norwegians, including Norwegian teachers. That said, a large number of signs in Malagasy Sign seem to be completely unrelated to their Norwegian Sign counterparts. Seven deaf schools in Madagascar are sponsored by Evangelical Lutherans.

Danish Sign Language family tree

French Sign (c. 1760–present)	local/home sign
Danish Sign (c. 1800–present)
Faroese Sign (c. 1960–present)	Greenlandic Sign (c. 1950–present)	Icelandic Sign (c. 1910–present)	Norwegian Sign (c. 1820–present)
Malagasy Sign (c. 1950–present)
