= Deafness in Iceland =

The history of deafness in Iceland includes the history of Icelandic Sign Language (ISL) and its status as the first language of the Deaf, the history of Icelandic Deaf education and Deaf organizations, and the status of hearing screenings in the country.

== Language emergence ==
Icelandic Sign Language (ISL), commonly known in Icelandic as ITM (Icelandic: Íslenskt táknmál), is the language of Iceland's Deaf community. There are about 250–300 users of this ISL.

ISL is recognized by the Icelandic government as the first language of the deaf community in Iceland, followed by spoken Icelandic. ISL diverged from Danish Sign Language after Iceland stopped sending deaf children to Copenhagen for schooling. Páll Pálsson, a former student of the danish school and pioneer of education in ISL, was the first to operate a school for the Deaf in Iceland.

Páll established his own school in Iceland and was the first teacher of the predecessor of ISL. Until he began teaching in 1867, Deaf students attended the Copenhagen school. The first community sign emerged in this school located in his own home where he began with only three students. The version of sign language that he taught, pre-ISL, was heavily influenced by Danish Sign Language since he was a student of the Danish school. There was heavy use of fingerspelling or "finger-language" as used in Páll's writings.

Previously, individuals in the hearing community have considered ISL as a tool on the path to learning spoken Icelandic. However, the deaf community in Iceland recognizes ISL as part of its identity and heritage. Language policy and the status of ISL is a collaborative effort between the Icelandic Sign Language community (ISL users) and the Icelandic government, according to article 7 of the Act on the Status of the Icelandic Language and Icelandic Sign Language. Members of the Deaf community are consulted on appointments to the Icelandic Language Council and involved in decisions about the language.

Languages used in the region include Danish, Icelandic, and ISL. Many who use ISL use the same variation because there is only one deaf school located in the capital of Reykjavík.

== Significant organizations ==
=== Icelandic Association of the Deaf ===
The Icelandic Association of the Deaf (IAD), officially established in 1960, is the top advocacy organization in Iceland led by deaf people for deaf people. It is the leading organization in ISL expertise and has been a part of the European Union of the Deaf since 2005.

Its main goal is to protect, promote, and fight for the Deaf and hard-of-hearing community. More specifically, it intends to improve quality of life and fight for equal opportunities for its members. The IAD published the first Icelandic Sign Language dictionary in 1978, which contained about 700 Icelandic signs, including hundreds borrowed from other Nordic languages and commonly agreed-upon Nordic signs.

=== Nordic Council of the Deaf ===
The Nordic Council of the Deaf was founded in 1907. It represents Denmark, Iceland, Norway, Sweden, Greenland, Finland, and the Faroe Islands. Its mission is to raise awareness of the interests regarding the Deaf in these countries. The political, cultural, and linguistic atmosphere of these countries are intertwined, so one of the original goals of the Nordic Council of the Deaf was to create a common Nordic Sign Language.

=== Communication Center for the Deaf and Hard of Hearing ===
The Communication Center for the Deaf and Hard of Hearing (Samskiptamiðstöð heyrnarlausra og heyrnarskertra; SHH) was a result of the Deaf education project that took place in Namibia (2006–2010). Its main initiative includes sharing resources for Deaf education across borders, sharing access to technologies with resources for deaf education, and highlighting how sharing relevant resources and expertise across borders is to Deaf education. The Communication Center has started the SignWiki Mobile Project as a resource for education. It estimates there to a 1 to 1,000 ratio of deaf to hearing individuals in Iceland.

== Human and civil rights ==
After 20 years of campaigns, Icelandic Sign Language became an official language in 2011. The Act Respecting the Status of the Icelandic language and Icelandic Sign Language, No. 61/2011 Article 21, was established, stating "that the Icelandic sign language is the first language of those who must rely on it for expression and communication, and of their children. It must be fostered and supported by public authorities. All persons who have a need for sign language must be given the opportunity to learn Icelandic sign language and to use it from the beginning of their language acquisition, or as soon as deafness, hearing impairment or deaf-blindness has been diagnosed. Their immediate family members shall have the same right"; this was reiterated by Iceland's initial report on the implementation of the United Nations Convention on the Rights of Persons with Disabilities (UNCRPD) and published by Iceland in 2018, which addressed the rights of persons using ISL.

The Icelandic Parliament also passed legislation declaring ISL as the first language for people who rely on it, also stating language discrimination is prohibited.

Therefore, ISL is legally equal to the spoken Icelandic language.

A recent study done on all Deaf individuals who sign noted that, although ISL has been legally recognized, there has been a continued struggle with the law not meeting the expectations of deaf individuals. The results of the study concluded that the participants feel as though equality to hearing individuals has not been achieved. This is in part due to the lack of solutions to obstacles they encounter by using ISL.

The European Federation of National Institutions for Language's Legal framework concerning Iceland states "The Icelandic sign language is the first language of those who have to use it for expression and interaction, as well as for their children. The state shall care for it and support it. Whoever needs the Icelandic sign language shall have the possibility to learn and use it as soon as his/her language acquisition starts, or from the time that the person has been recognized as deaf, hard of hearing or deaf and dumb. The same applies to their closest family members."

According to the Convention on the Rights of Persons with Disabilities (CRPD), Iceland stated it "aims to promote independent living, combat prejudice and social exclusion, and involve persons with disabilities in decision-making processes" in an action plan adopted by the government in 2016.

== Primary and secondary education ==
In accordance with the law set out in 2011, Icelandic Sign Language is the official first language of the Deaf community in Iceland followed by spoken Icelandic. The education system in Iceland emphasizes the principal of equal opportunity to receiving an education.

The Ministry of Education is responsible for all legislation concerning all school levels in Iceland (pre-primary through upper secondary education).

Most upper secondary schools offer special courses to prepare disabled students for life post-education, but lack support for students over the age of 16.

=== Deaf school in Iceland ===
Before the school for the Deaf was established in Reykjavík, children were sent to the Royal Institute for the Deaf-Mute in Copenhagen. Once Páll Pálsson's school for the deaf was established, students aged 10–25 lived in Páll's home. Páll died in 1890, but his teachings remained relatively the same. In 1944, Deaf education changed completely in the deaf school. Under the new principal, Brandur Jónsson, oralism became the method of learning in the classrooms and all signing was banned. The renewed educational goal was to teach children to speak and understand spoken Icelandic. In the 1980s, the education policy changed again; oralism proved unsuccessful as a teaching method and signing took precedent, although spoken Icelandic and lip-reading were primarily taught.

From the 1980s to the 1990s, there were many changes in the education system at the Deaf school. New teaching methods and a shift to highlight ISL and Deaf culture and education became the school's main focus. The school did not have a Deaf principal until 1996, when bilingualism (ISL and written Icelandic) were the main educational goals.

== Higher education ==
Iceland has four levels of education of which only one is mandatory. Upper secondary education (framhaldsskóli) follows compulsory (mandatory) education (grunnskóli). In upper secondary education, anyone who has completed compulsory education can attend for no tuition charge. Students in upper secondary education are usually 16–20 years of age. Anyone who has completed and has a diploma from upper secondary education can apply to receive higher education (háskólar) at the University of Iceland.

Besides paying for boarding, school supplies, and registration fees, tuition for all students is free.

The Ministry of Higher Education is responsible for legislation concerning higher education institutions in Iceland. There are eight institutions for higher education in Iceland:

- Bifröst University
- Iceland University of the Arts
- Reykjavik University
- The Agricultural University of Iceland
- Hólar University
- Akureyri University
- University of Iceland
- The Icelandic Centre for Research (RANNIS)

The University of Iceland offers several classes for a master's of Deaf studies and for many different degrees. Some examples of courses include Spanish, Global studies, and French studies among others. At the university, many courses are taught in English and many students receive some part of their education abroad. Accommodations for Deaf or hard of hearing students include requesting interpretation, but there are no statistics regarding the number of students using this accommodation. Students are encouraged to contact a school counselor and teachers are encouraged to contact the coordinator of interpreter services.

The Ministry of Higher Education issued a National Qualification Framework for Iceland (80/2007) with no mention of the Deaf or Hard of Hearing population in Iceland although, according to a country report done in 2018, clauses address discrimination towards disabled students, noting that it is not possible to meet their needs.

Whether or not disabled students take classes with a support worker depends on the students' educational needs and the school's curriculum.

== Employment ==
After completing compulsory education, students may decide to pursue vocational training or upper secondary education. There is limited information about legislation and policies concerned with vocational training for disabled individuals seeking employment and especially for Deaf and hard of hearing people in the region. There are no specific frameworks about the needs of disabled students in vocational trainings.

The National Association of People with Disabilities in Iceland assists those with disabilities with job searches, including by providing them housing.

Research by the Designs Project on employment for Deaf signers in Europe concluded that it is quantitatively hard to determine how Deaf signers fare in the workplace and to what extent education has an impact on employment outcomes. The study covered 16 countries, including Iceland, as well as similar Nordic countries like Denmark and Finland.

Although there is an action plan for people with disabilities that aligns with the CRPD's policies for increasing employment in the disabled population, there are no measures to support the right of workplace accommodations in line with CRPD policy.

== Early hearing screening and intervention ==
In Iceland, all babies have access to early hearing screening programs and screening through the National Hearing and Speech Institute. Although screening is available, it is not obligatory. Parents are able to decide whether to have their children screened. The Institute is paid for by the government as part of Iceland's healthcare system.

According to the Karolinska Institute of Sweden, neonatal screening is performed for "well" and "at-risk" babies in Iceland. At-risk refers to babies admitted to the neonatal intensive care unit (NICU) who are considered to be at risk for hearing loss. Well refers to babies not born prematurely or who were not admitted to the NICU.

There is no preschool hearing screening; this screening was terminated in 2012. Preschool refers to children aged 3–6 years old.

The National Hearing and Speech Institute of Iceland, Heyrnar- og talmeinastöð Íslands (HTÍ), was established in 1978. Its main goal was to service those with hearing and speech impairments by providing services in Iceland. These services include: offering diagnosis, offering treatments, providing cochlear implants, hearing aids, and other hearing-assistance devices.

== Language preservation and revitalization ==
ISL is classified by many sources as an indigenous minority sign language and the only traditional sign language in Iceland as well as a shared-signing language. There only an estimated 250 first-language users of ISL and 100–1,500 hearing speakers most of whom are related or connected to first language users.

Issues that would pose a threat to ISL are mainly due to external forces like technology, increased immigration and use of foreign languages, as well as demographic changes. Other causes include due to generational gaps, transmission barriers, and societal ignorance.

Since 1960, increased immigration, increased birth rate and higher life expectancy have contributed to rapidly changing demographics in the region. There was an estimated influx of over 100 languages from over 100 countries living in Iceland in 2011. This growing population of foreign language speakers constitutes about 10% of Iceland's present inhabitants, and 80% of children are growing up in multilingual households. This change to the linguistic landscape pose a threat to native ISL and its use moving forward as people acquire language skills other than Icelandic. Iceland has worked to track who uses ISL and the various levels of exposure to the language and found that roughly .005% of the total population (in 2020) uses ISL.

Studies have also noted that ISL is typically not taught by parents to their deaf children as a first language and usually teaching is influenced by the multilingualism of other users, which is a possibility as to why the language can be considered endangered. Because ISL is a second language, usually not transmitted directly by parents, that means the quality of ISL acquisition is dependent upon the education learners do receive though non-native input of the language (second-generation language users) from people of hearing and Deaf backgrounds and multilingual interactions.

Transmission barriers of the language stem from the aforementioned reason can be combated by preserving ISL in literacy curricula and thorough documentation of ISL and its native speakers' "perception of the world around them" to increase proficiency in the language. One specific barrier, audism, could be addressed by the language becoming politically differentiated from Europe.
