= Signwriting =

Signwriting may refer to:

- the work of a signwriter, designing, manufacturing and installing signs
- SignWriting, a writing system for sign languages

== See also ==
- Sign language
