= International Movement Writing Alphabet =

Writing system to describe movement

The International Movement Writing Alphabet (IMWA) is a set of symbols that can be used to describe and record movement. Its creator, Valerie Sutton, also invented MovementWriting, a writing system which employs IMWA. It in turn has several application areas within which it is specialised:

- SignWriting, for sign languages, the most developed so far.
- DanceWriting, a form of dance notation.
- MimeWriting, for classic mimestry.
- SportsWriting, for the kinesiology of ice skating and gymnastics.

== Identification numbers ==
The IMWA has more than 27,000 elements that are represented by unique identification numbers. Each identification number specifies six attributes—category, group, symbol, variation, fill, and rotation—as dash-separated values. The symbol is specified with a three-digit value whereas all other attributes use a two-digit value (e.g., 01-01-001-01-01-01).

There are eight categories: hand, movement, face, head, upper body, full body, space, and punctuation.

There are 40 groups. The keyboard design and symbol palette are based on the 40 groups.

== History ==
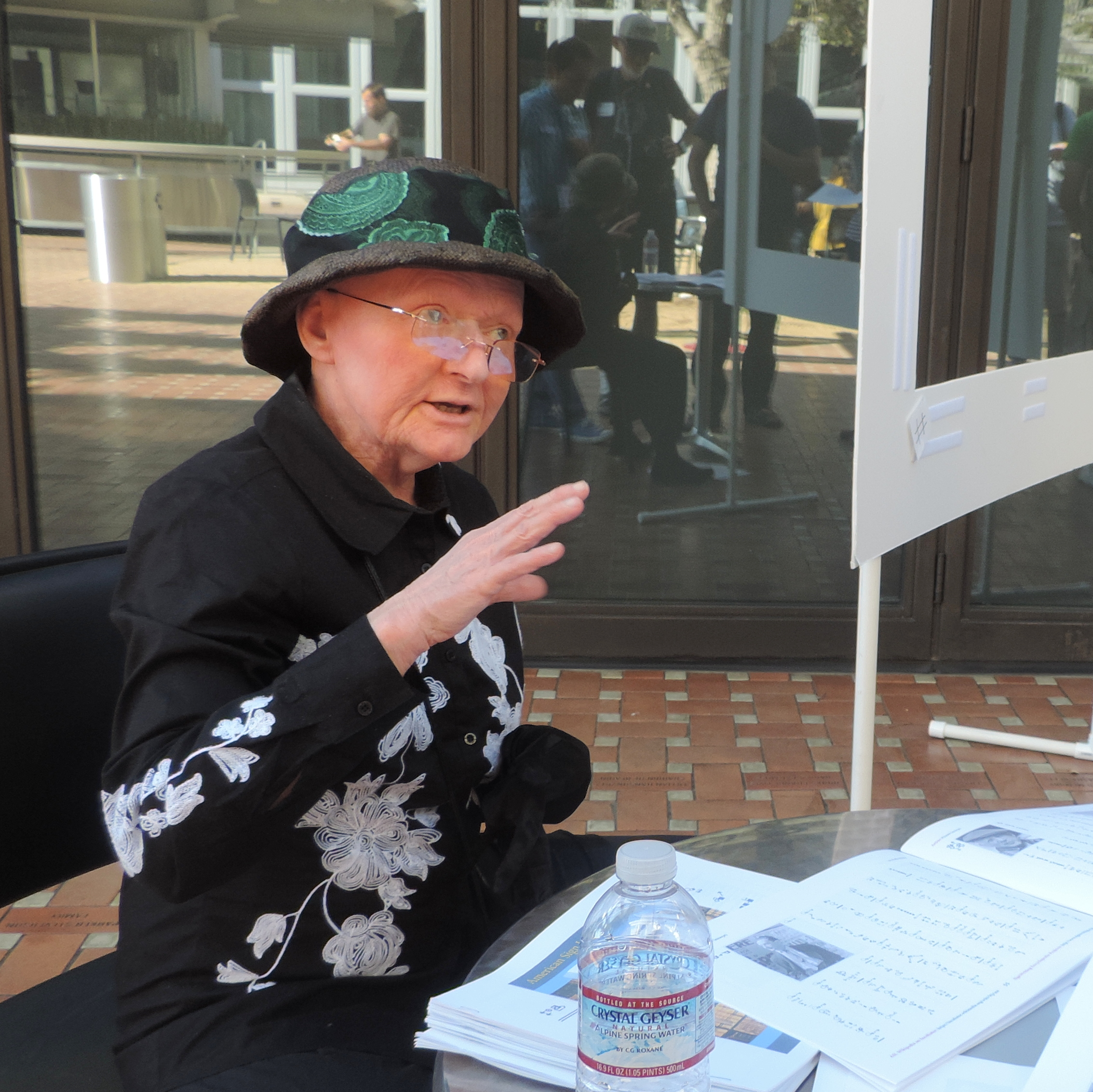
Valerie Sutton

The IMWA was originally designed for describing sign language and consequently was named Sutton's Sign Symbol Sequence (SSS) by its inventor, Valerie Sutton. The original symbol set, SSS-95, was limited in size due to memory constraints in personal computers at the time. The SSS-99 symbol set expanded the number of symbols, and the SSS-2002 set was the first to use the current identification numbering system. The final version, SSS-2004, was renamed International Movement Writing Alphabet (SSS-IMWA) to reflect its usefulness in applications beyond sign language.
