= Icelandic Sign Language =

Deaf sign language of Iceland

- Íslenskt táknmál
- Native to: Iceland
- Native speakers: 250–300 (2010–2014)
- Language family: French Sign: Danish Sign; Icelandic Sign Language

Language codes
- ISO 639-3: icl
- Glottolog: icel1236

Icelandic Sign Language (Icelandic: Íslenskt táknmál) is the sign language of the deaf community in Iceland. It is based on Danish Sign Language; until 1910, deaf Icelandic people were sent to school in Denmark, but the languages have diverged since then. It is officially recognized by the state and regulated by a national committee.

Icelandic Sign Language is distinct from spoken Icelandic; in 1999, the Icelandic Ministry of Education stated that in the Icelandic basic curriculum, Icelandic Sign Language is the first language of deaf people, while spoken Icelandic is a second language. Therefore, deaf Icelanders should learn Icelandic Sign Language as their first language and Icelandic as their second language.

A lexical comparison of signs from Icelandic Sign Language with their counterparts in Danish Sign Language was undertaken to try to determine the degree of current lexical similarity. It was found that whilst the two sign languages are certainly related, 37% of signs analysed were completely different in structure and a further 16%, whilst similar, still contrasted in one of the four parameters of hand-configuration, location, movement or orientation.

== Geographic Distribution ==
Icelandic sign language is used as a first language of deaf people in Iceland. The majority of the speakers live in Reykjavík and the surrounding areas.

== Recognition and Status ==
In June 2011, Icelandic Sign Language was officially recognized as a first language. In No. 61/2011 under Article 3 it states that "Icelandic sign language is the first language of those who have to rely on it for expression and communication, and of their children. The government authorities shall nurture and support it. All those who need to use sign language shall have the opportunity to learn and use Icelandic sign language as soon as their language acquisition process begins, or from the time when deafness, hearing impairment or deaf-blindness is diagnosed. Their immediate family members shall have the same right."

Article 5 of the Act also ensures that the government must promote all aspects of education and awareness in regards to Icelandic Sign Language.

Article 7 appoints the Icelandic Sign Language Council whose role is to give advice to the government regarding the implementation of regulations for Icelandic Sign Language.

Article 13 provides that all who need Icelandic Sign Language services will have access to them.

== Dialects ==
There are no geographical dialects of Icelandic Sign Language. However, generational variation has been attested. There is variation in the phonology, lexicon, morphology, and syntax between different generations.

== History and Classification ==
Iceland was part of the Kingdom of Denmark until 1918. Icelandic Sign Language is part of the Danish Sign Language family.

Until the first Icelandic teacher, Páll Pálsson, was employed in Iceland in 1867, Icelandic deaf children attended a school in Copenhagen. In 1874, Páll outlined his objectives for teaching his students in a newspaper article. He wanted his students to be able to express their thoughts and be understood through writing, finger language and pointing, and did not care about speaking Icelandic or lip reading.

In 1922, the Danish mouth-hand system was adopted as the new teaching method, with the objective of having the students speak and understand speech augmented with finger spelling and signs. A change was made in 1944 to the educational system and oralism was adopted. All signing was banned in the classroom because the sole objective of oralism was to teach the students to speak and understand Icelandic.

In the early eighties, new principal Guðlaug Snorradóttir introduced a new teaching method called Total Communication to the deaf school. The total communication method involved using multiple methods for communicating, including the manual alphabet, signs, gestures, lip-reading, and writing. This was not teaching Icelandic Sign Language as they only taught single signs and no grammar. The main objective of the school remained teaching the students to speak and understand Icelandic. The teachers at the school did not know Icelandic Sign Language, and so the students could only communicate with them through speaking.

Berglind Stefánsdóttir was appointed as the first deaf principal of the deaf school in 1996. It was during her term that bilingualism became the objective for students. In 2002 the deaf school was merged into the hearing school, and while bilingualism was still promoted, the deaf children were still being taught with techniques developed for hearing children. Icelandic Sign Language has only a marginal role in the classroom.

Danish Sign Language family tree

French Sign (c. 1760–present)	local/home sign
Danish Sign (c. 1800–present)
Faroese Sign (c. 1960–present)	Greenlandic Sign (c. 1950–present)	Icelandic Sign (c. 1910–present)	Norwegian Sign (c. 1820–present)
Malagasy Sign (c. 1950–present)

== Manual Alphabet ==
The manual alphabet used in Icelandic Sign Language is signed using one hand. The manual alphabet is used when a signer does not know the sign for something they are trying to express, or for things like names, street or place names, companies or abbreviations.

== Linguistics ==
=== Grammar ===
Icelandic Sign Language has somewhat variable word order depending on the verb used. The basic word order is SVO; however, with agreement verbs SOV and OSV word order is also accepted.

==== BIDD–LALLA Distinction ====
ÍTM has two signs for the verb vera ('to be'), known as BIDD and LALLA. BIDD is used to describe permanent conditions, while LALLA is used for temporary conditions. This distinction is similar to the distinction between the Spanish and Portuguese verbs ser and estar.

=== Vocabulary ===
Research shows a high degree of intelligibility between Icelandic Sign Language and Danish Sign Language. The first Icelandic Sign Language dictionary published in 1976 lists 600–700 signs borrowed from Danish Sign Language and Swedish Sign Language.

=== Phonology ===
There has been little research into Icelandic Sign Language's phonology. SignWiki Ísland lists 35 different handshapes with seven places of articulation.

Icelandic Sign Language has minimal pairs in all five of the sign parameters. Some examples of minimal pairs in Icelandic Sign Language are the words father and grandfather which contrast with each other by handshape, do and teach which contrast by orientation, fun and sick which contrast by movement, mother and red which contrast by location, and finally sister and brother which contrast by non-manuals.

=== Morphology ===
In order to mark the plural in personal pronouns in Icelandic Sign Language an arc is added to the index pointing from the singular sign. Icelandic Sign Language has twenty-five agreement verbs; the features of agreement are motion of the hands or orientation of the hands or both.

== See also ==
- Deafness in Iceland
- Sigurlín Margrét Sigurðardóttir
- Legal recognition of sign languages
