= Deafness in Denmark =

Though official statistics are not available, the Danish Deaf Association estimates that there are currently about 5,000 deaf users of Danish Sign Language, which is equivalent to nearly 0.1% of the country's population. As many as 20,000 people are thought to use the language daily in their professional or personal life.

== Language emergence ==
Danish Sign Language (DSL) is the main sign language used in Denmark, written in Danish as dansk tegnsprog. In Greenland, part of the Realm of Denmark, a very similar form of sign is used that some might classify as a distinct language. Danish Sign Language can be traced back to the creation of Denmark's first school for the deaf, opened in 1807. The founder of the school studied deaf education in Paris, and as deaf students came together as a large community for the first time, their local home signs converged with French Sign Language. Thus, Danish Sign Language is a deaf-community sign language.

== Significant organizations ==
=== Danish Deaf Association ===
Founded in 1935, the Danish Deaf Association, or Danske Døves Landsforbund (DDL), is privately run but receives monetary support from the government. The organization fought for the inclusion of sign language interpretation for broadcast news, encouraged the Ministry of Education to offer classes in sign language interpretation for people with no prior knowledge of the language, and acquired a grant that allowed them to produce an online Danish Sign Language dictionary. Its members continue to push for greater equality between the deaf and hearing communities in Denmark and for the recognition of Danish Sign Language.

=== Danish Deaf Youth Association ===
The Danish Deaf Youth Association, or Danske Døves Ungdomsforbund (DDU), operates mostly as a subsidiary of the Danish Deaf Association. It was formed within the DDL in 1969 and was independently recognized in 1994.

=== Danish Deaf Sports Association ===
The Danish Deaf Sports Association [Dansk Døve-Idrætsforbund (DDI)] originated in 1922 and exists under the Danish Sports Association. It provides access to sports at any level—from grassroots to internationally competitive—to those who are hearing-impaired.

=== Center for Sign Language / Center for the Deaf ===
The Danish Center for Sign Language (Center for Tegnsprog), also called the Center for the Deaf (CFD), was established in 1972, and has gone by several different names throughout its years, including the Center for Total Communication of the Deaf (Døves Center for Total Kommunikation). The CFD is a nonprofit organization and the most extensive of its kind for people with hearing disabilities in Denmark. It provides support for housing, job seeking, and mental health services, with special consideration for those with further impairments. All staff are trained in sign language.

== Human/Civil rights ==
Deaf people in Denmark have quite a few protections under the law. Denmark ratified the United Nations Convention on the Rights of Persons with Disabilities (CRPD) in 2009 and the Optional Protocol in 2014. The Committee on the Rights of Persons with Disabilities requires that the countries involved submit periodic reports, to which Denmark has complied, with their most recent report submitted in 2020. In their CRPD initial state party's report, Denmark outlined multiple deaf-specific guidelines for the country. They updated their emergency warning system to send deaf individuals text message alerts at the same time that sirens go off, they maintain the Danish Deaf Sports Association within the Danish Sports Organization for the Disabled, and they require news broadcasts to be interpreted either at the time of airing or at maximum by the following day. Additionally, they provide interpretation services for all communication with authorities, as well as any other events vital to one's quality of life, specifically throughout one's education. Finally, Denmark offers a sign language interpreter program at several schools with a professional bachelor's degree option.

Beyond the CRPD, Denmark has passed national laws to further guarantee rights for deaf individuals, such as the Consolidated Health Act ensuring interpreters during medical care, and the Act for Compensation of Disabled Employees ensuring an interpreter for up to twenty hours a week while working. Also, deaf students are offered a regulated and free education through the government, just as any other student in Denmark.

The World Federation of the Deaf, an NGO, classifies Denmark as a country with Sign Language Recognition, as well as National Language Council Recognition.

== Primary and secondary education ==
In Denmark, both primary and secondary education are fully funded by the government, which includes education for deaf students. Deaf education has been available in Denmark since 1807, when the first school for hard-of-hearing children was opened in the country, and schooling has been required for all deaf children since 1817. Throughout much of the 19th and 20th centuries, various schools taught using the oral method, the signing method, or a combination of the two, with a majority giving preference to oralism. In the 1970s, as Danish Sign Language gained recognition and popularity, deaf schools adopted a teaching method of total communication. Shortly thereafter in the 1980s, the bilingual-bicultural approach became favored. When cochlear implantation became the norm in the mid-2000s, the country pivoted toward oral education once again, and deaf schools saw a decrease in enrollment.

Today, the Danish government leaves the decision between deaf or mainstream schooling up to the child's parents. Most deaf and hard-of-hearing children are enrolled in their local mainstream school and thus do not use Danish Sign Language in their education.

== Employment ==
Denmark has a 77% employment rate among its general population according to a study done in 2015, but only about a 40% employment rate among deaf and hard-of-hearing adults based on a study published in 2019. The 2019 study also found that deaf or hard-of-hearing people were less likely to own their own company or to be employed in a management position when compared to the general population.

During the hiring process, deaf people have reported unfair application rejections, sometimes expressly due to their deafness. This discrimination occurs despite the fact that it is explicitly against Danish law.

Under the Act for Compensation of Disabled Employees, deaf Danes are granted up to 20 hours a week of interpretation services for the workplace.

== Healthcare ==
All Danish citizens are entitled to a wide array of healthcare services for free, and hard-of-hearing people specifically have protected access to free interpretation services under the Consolidated Health Act. However, hearing impaired patients often face difficulties in obtaining an interpreter at the hospital due to misunderstandings over who is responsible for their cost, or staff refusal to bring in an interpreter when they believe it unnecessary. Additionally, interpreters are only provided when a deaf or hard-of-hearing person is the patient, so if a relative or other visitor needs to speak with anyone in the hospital, they must pay for their own interpreter or find an alternate way to communicate. If an interpreter is not present for whatever reason for a hearing impaired patient, hospital staff will sometimes use the patient's relatives to facilitate communication. For the relative, this creates stress over possibly forgetting to relay important information, and for the patient, this contributes to unwanted feelings of reliance on others.

Deaf Danes have also expressed disappointment over their options for mental health services, as there are no trauma support groups specifically for hard-of-hearing individuals, and hearing support groups are not always welcome to the idea of a hearing impaired member. Further, there is a lack of crisis psychologists who are familiar with Danish Sign Language, and involving an interpreter in the process can create a crisis of confidentiality and an interruption of conversational flow.

Another barrier to healthcare for the hearing impaired is that many of the professionals they encounter are not properly equipped to treat them. Without any training or prior experience, these professionals are unprepared to alter their communication methods for a hard-of-hearing patient.
