= Danish Deaf Association =

Danish advocacy group

- Danske Døves Landsforbund
- Abbreviation: DDL
- Predecessor: Døvstummeforeningen af 1866
- Formation: 18 May 1935; 90 years ago
- Purpose: Deaf advocacy
- Headquarters: Copenhagen, Denmark
- Location: Denmark
- Chair: Lars Ahlburg
- Website: ddl.dk

The Danish Deaf Association (Danish: Danske Døves Landsforbund, DDL) is a private advocacy group which works to ensure better living conditions for deaf people in Denmark. It campaigns for equality between deaf and hearing people in education, paid employment and accessibility, as well as the legal status and accessibility of Danish Sign Language.

== History ==
In 1866, a group of deaf craftsmen in Copenhagen who had attended the Danish Institute of Deafness founded an association called Døvstummeforeningen af 1866 ('the Deaf-mute Association of 1866'). On 29 October 1898, they formally opened their own building at Brohusgade 17 in Nørrebro. At the 4th Congress of the Council of the Deaf in Sønderborg on 18 May 1935, it was decided to found a nationwide association, the Danish Deaf Association.

The Danish Deaf Association later helped found Døvefilm in 1963, a production company that produces TV programs for the deaf.

== Danish Sign Language advocacy ==
The organization worked for the formal recognition of Danish Sign Language as a separate language, which was achieved in 2014. Upon its recognition, the Danish Sign Language Council was established. The Danish Deaf Association appoints a member to the council. The Danish Deaf Association has also pushed for Danish authorities to make information available in Danish Sign Language, such as information about the COVID-19 pandemic.

== Memberships ==
The Danish Deaf Association is a member of the World Federation of the Deaf, the European Union of the Deaf since 1985, and the Nordic Council of the Deaf.
