= Norwegian Association of the Deaf =

Disability organization based in Norway

The Norwegian Association of the Deaf (NDF; Norwegian: Norges Døveforbund) is a national organisation for the deaf and sign language users in Norway.

It is affiliated to the World Federation of the Deaf (WFD). It was established in 1918. Its headquarters are in Oslo. The official language of the association is Norwegian Sign Language. NDF has been affiliated with the European Union of the Deaf since 1995. The association is a member of the Nordic Council of the Deaf.

== See also ==
- Deaf culture
- Deaf rights movement
