= Causes of hearing loss =

Causes of hearing loss include ageing, genetics, perinatal problems, loud sounds, and diseases. For some kinds of hearing loss the cause may be classified as of unknown cause.

== Age ==
There is a progressive loss of ability to hear high frequencies with ageing known as presbycusis. For men, this can start as early as 25 and for women at 30. Although genetically variable, it is a normal concomitant of ageing and is distinct from hearing loss caused by noise exposure, toxins, or disease agents. Common conditions that can increase the risk of hearing loss in elderly people are high blood pressure, diabetes, or the use of certain medications harmful to the ear. While everyone loses hearing with age, the amount and type of hearing loss is variable.

== Noise ==
Noise exposure is the cause of approximately half of all cases of hearing loss, causing some degree of problems in 5% of the population globally. The National Institute for Occupational Safety and Health (NIOSH) recognizes that the majority of hearing loss is not due to age, but due to noise exposure. By correcting for age in assessing hearing, one tends to overestimate the hearing loss due to noise for some and underestimate it for others.

Hearing loss due to noise may be temporary, called a 'temporary threshold shift', a reduced sensitivity to sound over a wide frequency range resulting from exposure to a brief but very loud noise like a gunshot, firecracker, jet engine, jackhammer, etc. or exposure to loud sound over a few hours such as during a pop concert or nightclub session. Recovery of hearing is usually within 24 hours but may take up to a week. Both constant exposure to loud sounds (85 dB(A) or above) and one-time exposure to extremely loud sounds (120 dB(A) or above) may cause permanent hearing loss.

Noise-induced hearing loss (NIHL) typically manifests as elevated hearing thresholds (i.e. less sensitivity or muting) between 3000 and 6000 Hz, centred at 4000 Hz. As noise damage progresses, damage spreads to affect lower and higher frequencies. On an audiogram, the resulting configuration has a distinctive notch, called a 'noise' notch. As ageing and other effects contribute to higher frequency loss (6–8 kHz on an audiogram), this notch may be obscured and entirely disappear.

Various governmental, industry, and standards organizations set noise standards.

The U.S. Environmental Protection Agency has identified the level of 70 dB(A) (40% louder to twice as loud as normal conversation; typical level of TV, radio, stereo; city street noise) for 24‑hour exposure as the level necessary to protect the public from hearing loss and other disruptive effects from noise, such as sleep disturbance, stress-related problems, learning detriment, etc. Noise levels are typically in the 65 to 75 dB (A) range for those living near airports or freeways and may result in hearing damage if sufficient time is spent outdoors.

Louder sounds cause damage in a shorter period of time. Estimation of a "safe" duration of exposure is possible using an exchange rate of 3 dB. As 3 dB represents a doubling of the intensity of sound, the duration of exposure must be cut in half to maintain the same energy dose. For workplace noise regulation, the "safe" daily exposure amount at 85 dB A, known as an exposure action value, is 8 hours, while the "safe" exposure at 91 dB(A) is only 2 hours. Different standards use exposure action values between 80 dBA and 90 dBA. Note that for some people, sound may be damaging at even lower levels than 85 dB A. Exposures to other ototoxicants (such as pesticides, some medications including chemotherapy agents, solvents, etc.) can lead to greater susceptibility to noise damage, as well as causing its own damage. This is called a synergistic interaction. Since noise damage is cumulative over long periods, persons who are exposed to non-workplace noise, like recreational activities or environmental noise, may have compounding damage from all sources.

Some national and international organizations and agencies use an exchange rate of 4 dB or 5 dB. While these exchange rates may indicate a wider zone of comfort or safety, they can significantly underestimate the damage caused by loud noise. For example, at 100 dB (nightclub music level), a 3 dB exchange rate would limit exposure to 15 minutes; the 5 dB exchange rate allows an hour.

Many people are unaware of the presence of environmental sound at damaging levels, or of the level at which sound becomes harmful. Common sources of damaging noise levels include car stereos, children's toys, motor vehicles, crowds, lawn and maintenance equipment, power tools, gun use, musical instruments, and even hair dryers. Noise damage is cumulative; all sources of damage must be considered to assess risk. If one is exposed to loud sound (including music) at high levels or for extended durations (85 dB A or greater), then hearing loss will occur. Sound intensity (sound energy or propensity to cause damage to the ears) increases dramatically with proximity according to an inverse square law: halving the distance to the sound quadruples the sound intensity.

In the US, 12.5% of children aged 6–19 years have permanent hearing damage from excessive noise exposure. The World Health Organization estimates that half of those between 12 and 35 are at risk from using personal audio devices that are too loud.

Hearing loss due to noise has been described as primarily a condition of modern society. In preindustrial times, humans had far less exposure to loud sounds. Studies of preindustrial peoples indicate that much of what has been attributed to age-related hearing loss may be long-term cumulative damage from all sources, especially noise. People living in preindustrial societies have considerably less hearing loss than similar populations living in modern society. Among preindustrial people who have migrated into modern society, hearing loss is proportional to the number of years spent in modern society. Military service in World War II, the Korean War, and the Vietnam War, has likely also caused hearing loss in large numbers of men from those generations, though proving that hearing loss was a direct result of military service is problematic without entry and exit audiograms.

Hearing loss in adolescents may be caused by loud noises from toys, music by headphones, and concerts or events. In 2017, the Centers for Disease Control and Prevention brought their researchers together with experts from the World Health Organization and academia to examine the risk of hearing loss from excessive noise exposure in and outside the workplace in different age groups, as well as actions being taken to reduce the burden of the condition. A summary report was published in 2018.

In the United States, hearing loss may be more likely among members of the Republican Party due to greater firearm ownership, according to The Washington Post in February 2024.

== Genetic ==
Hearing loss can be inherited. Around 75–80% of all these cases are inherited by recessive genes, 20–25% are inherited by dominant genes, 1–2% are inherited by X-linked patterns, and fewer than 1% are inherited by mitochondrial inheritance.

When looking at the genetics of deafness, there are 2 different forms, syndromic and nonsyndromic. Syndromic deafness occurs when there are other signs or medical problems aside from deafness in an individual. This accounts for around 30% of deaf individuals who are deaf from a genetic standpoint. Nonsyndromic deafness occurs when there are no other signs or medical problems associated with an individual other than deafness. From a genetic standpoint, this accounts for the other 70% of cases and represents the majority of hereditary hearing loss. Syndromic cases occur with disorders such as Usher syndrome, Stickler syndrome, Waardenburg syndrome, Chudley-Mccullough syndrome, Alport's syndrome, and neurofibromatosis type 2. These are diseases that have deafness as one of the symptoms or as a common feature associated with it. Many of the genetic mutations giving rise to syndromic deafness have been identified. In nonsyndromic cases, where deafness is the only finding, it is more difficult to identify the genetic mutation although some have been discovered.

- Gene mapping has identified the genetic locations for several nonsyndromic dominant (DFNA#) and recessive (DFNB#) forms of deafness. The first gene mapped for non-syndromic deafness, DFNA1, involves a splice site mutation in the formin-related homolog diaphanous 1 (DIAPH1). A single base change in a large Costa Rican family was identified as causative in a rare form of low-frequency onset progressive hearing loss with autosomal dominant inheritance exhibiting variable age of onset and complete penetrance by age 30. The most common type of congenital hearing loss in developed countries is DFNB1, also known as connexin 26 deafness or GJB2-related deafness.
- The most common dominant syndromic forms of hearing loss include Stickler syndrome and Waardenburg syndrome.
- The most common recessive syndromic forms of hearing loss are Pendred syndrome and Usher syndrome.
- The congenital defect microtia, deformed or unformed outer ear, can be associated with partial or complete conductive deafness, depending upon the severity of the deformity and whether the middle ear is also affected. It can also be associated with abnormalities of the inner ear giving rise to an additional sensorineural component to the hearing loss (mixed deafness).
- Dozens of additional genes for nonsyndromic deafness have been identified.
- Otoferlin gene defects are the cause of around 1% to 3% of cases of inborn deafness

== Perinatal problems ==
- Fetal alcohol spectrum disorders are reported to cause hearing loss in up to 64% of infants born to alcoholic mothers, from the ototoxic effect on the developing fetus plus malnutrition during pregnancy from the excess alcohol intake.
- Premature birth can be associated with sensorineural hearing loss because of an increased risk of hypoxia, hyperbilirubinaemia, ototoxic medication, and infection as well as noise exposure in the neonatal units. The risk of hearing loss is greatest for those weighing less than 1500 g at birth.

== Disorders ==
- Auditory neuropathy a disorder of poor speech perception even though the tympanic membrane, middle ear structures, and cochlear nerve are intact. People with auditory neuropathy may have normal hearing or hearing loss ranging from mild to severe.
- Inherited disorders
  - People with Down syndrome are more likely to have hearing loss. This is usually due to middle ear effusions in childhood but towards the end of the second decade, they may develop a high-frequency sensorineural hearing loss which may progressively worsen.
  - Charcot–Marie–Tooth disease variant 1E (CMT1E) is noted for demyelinating in addition to deafness.
  - Autoimmune disease is recognized as a cause of cochlear damage. Although rare, autoimmune processes can target the cochlea specifically as a first presentation. Granulomatosis with polyangiitis is one of the autoimmune conditions that may precipitate hearing loss. Cogan's syndrome commonly presents with hearing loss.
  - Multiple sclerosis can affect hearing as well. Multiple sclerosis is an autoimmune disease where the immune system attacks the myelin sheath, a covering that protects the nerves. If the auditory nerve becomes damaged, the affected person will become completely deaf in one or both ears. There is no cure for MS.
- Meningitis may damage the auditory nerve or the cochlea.
- Cholesteatoma is a (acquired or congenital) benign collection of squamous epithelial cells within the middle ear. Acquired cholesteatomas are commonly caused by repeated middle ear infections
- Otosclerosis is a condition that can cause fixation of the stapes (or stirrup) in the middle ear preventing its movement and causing conductive hearing loss.
- Perilymph fistula – a microtear in either the round or oval window (membranes separating the middle and inner ear) of the cochlea causing perilymph to leak into the middle ear. This usually occurs as a consequence of trauma, including barotrauma, and can give rise to vertigo as well as hearing loss.
- Ménière's disease (endolymphatic hydrops) occurs when there is elevated pressure in the endolymph in the cochlea. Its symptoms include fluctuating low-frequency hearing loss, aural fullness, tinnitus, and dizziness lasting for hours
- Recurring ear infections or concomitant secondary infections (such as bacterial infection after viral infection) can result in hearing loss
- Strokes – Depending on what blood vessels are affected by the stroke, one of the symptoms can be deafness
- Superior semicircular canal dehiscence, a gap in the bone cover above the inner ear, can lead to low-frequency conductive hearing loss, autophony, and vertigo.
- Syndromic hearing loss can be either conductive or sensorineural. It occurs with abnormalities in other parts of the body. Examples include Pierre Robin syndrome, Treacher Collins syndrome, Retinitis Pigmentosa, Pendred syndrome, and Turner syndrome, among others.
- Syphilis is commonly transmitted from pregnant women to their fetuses, and about a third of infected children will eventually become deaf.
- Vestibular schwannoma, erroneously known as Acoustic neuromas, and other types of brain tumours can cause hearing loss by infringement of the tumour on the vestibulocochlear nerve
- Viral diseases of the ear can cause sensorineural hearing loss usually as the consequence of labyrinthitis. The person may be generally unwell at the time.
  - Measles may cause auditory nerve damage but usually gives rise to a chronic middle ear problem giving rise to mixed hearing loss.
  - Mumps (Epidemic parotitis) may result in profound sensorineural hearing loss (90 dB or more), unilateral (one ear) or bilateral (both ears).
  - Congenital rubella (also called German measles) syndrome, can cause deafness in newborns
  - Several varieties of herpes viruses that cause other diseases can also infect the ear, and can result in hearing loss: congenital infection with cytomegalovirus is responsible for deafness in newborn children and also progressive sensorineural hearing loss in childhood; herpes simplex type 1, oral herpes associated with cold sores; Epstein Barr virus that causes mononucleosis; varicella zoster oticus that causes facial paralysis (Ramsay Hunt syndrome)
  - People with HIV/AIDS may develop hearing problems due to the disease itself, medications they take for the disease, or an increased rate of other infections.
  - West Nile fever, which can cause a variety of neurological disorders, can also cause hearing loss by attacking the auditory nerve.

== Chemicals ==
=== Environmental or occupational chemicals ===
In addition to medications, hearing loss can also result from specific chemicals in the environment: metals, such as lead; solvents, such as toluene (found in crude oil, gasoline, and automobile exhaust, for example); and asphyxiants. Combined with noise, these ototoxic chemicals have an additive effect on a person's hearing loss.

Hearing loss due to chemicals starts in the high-frequency range and is irreversible. It damages the cochlea with lesions and degrades central portions of the auditory system. For some ototoxic chemical exposures, particularly styrene, the risk of hearing loss can be higher than being exposed to noise alone. The effects are greatest when the combined exposure includes impulse noise.

- Solvents
  - Toluene, styrene, xylene, n-hexane, ethyl benzene, white spirits/Stoddard, carbon disulfide, jet fuel, perchloroethylene, trichloroethylene, p-xylene
- Asphyxiants
  - Carbon monoxide, hydrogen cyanide
- Heavy metals
  - Lead, mercury, cadmium, arsenic, tin-hydrocarbon compounds (trimethyltin)
- Pesticides and herbicides – The evidence is weak regarding the association between herbicides and hearing loss; hearing loss in such circumstances may be due to concomitant exposure to insecticides.
  - Paraquat, organophosphates

A 2018 informational bulletin by the US Occupational Safety and Health Administration (OSHA) and the National Institute for Occupational Safety and Health (NIOSH) introduces the issue, provides examples of ototoxic chemicals, lists the industries and occupations at risk and provides prevention information.

=== Drugs ===
A 2023 systematic review and meta-analysis found that alcohol consumption is associated with an increased risk of hearing loss.

=== Medications ===
Some medications may reversibly affect hearing. These medications are considered ototoxic. This includes loop diuretics such as furosemide and bumetanide, non-steroidal anti-inflammatory drugs (NSAIDs) both over-the-counter (aspirin, ibuprofen, naproxen) as well as prescription (celecoxib, diclofenac, etc.), paracetamol, quinine, and macrolide antibiotics. The link between NSAIDs and hearing loss tends to be greater in women, especially those who take ibuprofen six or more times a week. Others may cause permanent hearing loss. The most important group is the aminoglycosides (main member gentamicin) and platinum-based chemotherapeutic drugs such as cisplatin and carboplatin.

In 2007, the U.S. Food and Drug Administration (FDA) warned about possible sudden hearing loss from PDE5 inhibitors, which are used for erectile dysfunction.

Audiologic monitoring for ototoxicity allows for the early detection of changes to hearing status presumably attributed to a drug/treatment regime so that changes in the drug regimen may be considered, and audiologic intervention when handicapping hearing impairment has occurred. Co-administration of anti-oxidants and ototoxic medications may limit the extent of the ototoxic damage.

== Physical trauma ==
There can be damage either to the ear, whether the external or middle ear, to the cochlea, or to the brain centres that process the aural information conveyed by the ears. Damage to the middle ear may include fracture and discontinuity of the ossicular chain. Damage to the inner ear (cochlea) may be caused by temporal bone fracture. People who sustain head injury are especially vulnerable to hearing loss or tinnitus, either temporary or permanent.
