= Norwegian Sign Language =

Principal sign language in Norway

- Norsk tegnspråk
- Native to: Norway
- Native speakers: 2,500 (2014)
- Language family: French Sign: Danish Sign; Norwegian Sign Language

Language codes
- ISO 639-3: nsl – Norwegian SL
- Glottolog: norw1261
- ELP: Norwegian Sign Language

Norwegian Sign Language, or NSL (Norwegian Bokmål: norsk tegnspråk or Nynorsk: norsk teiknspråk, NTS), is the principal sign language in Norway. There are many sign language organizations and some television programs broadcast in NSL in Norway. The Norwegian Broadcasting Corporation airs Nyheter på tegnspråk (News in Sign Language) daily and previously aired Tid for tegn (Time for Signs) through the years 2008-2011.

NSL is an official language as of 1 January 2022.

== Relation to Malagasy Sign Language ==
The language is sometimes reported to be similar, or even identical to the sign language used in Madagascar. In fact, while Norwegian Sign Language may have influenced Malagasy sign language via the creation of schools for the deaf by Norwegian Lutheran missionaries, the languages are quite distinct. Out of a sample of 96 sign pairs, 18 pairs were identical between the two languages, 26 showed some level of similarity, and 52 appeared completely unrelated. It is not yet known to what degree the similarities are a result of direct borrowing, borrowing from a common source language (such as ASL or International Sign), mimesis of the thing they refer to, or sheer coincidence.

Danish Sign Language family tree

French Sign (c. 1760–present)	local/home sign
Danish Sign (c. 1800–present)
Faroese Sign (c. 1960–present)	Greenlandic Sign (c. 1950–present)	Icelandic Sign (c. 1910–present)	Norwegian Sign (c. 1820–present)
Malagasy Sign (c. 1950–present)

== See also ==
- Norway
- Norwegian Association of the Deaf
- Deaf culture
- Deaf rights movement
