= SignWriting =

Writing system for sign languages

- Script type: Iconic featural script
- Period: 1974–present
- Direction: Vertical (top-to-bottom, left-to-right) or horizontal (left-to-right, top-to-bottom)
- Languages: Sign languages

ISO 15924
- ISO 15924: Sgnw (095), SignWriting

Unicode
- Unicode alias: SignWriting
- Unicode range: U+1D800–U+1DAAF

Sutton SignWriting, or simply SignWriting, is a writing system for sign languages. It can be used to write any sign language.

SignWriting is the only international writing system for sign languages. It has been used to publish young adult fiction, translate the Bible, caption YouTube videos, and study sign language literacy.

The SignWriting system is visually iconic: its symbols depict the hands, face, and body of a signer. Unlike most writing systems, which are written linearly, the symbols of SignWriting are written two-dimensionally, to represent the signing space.

SignWriting was invented in 1974 by Valerie Sutton, a ballet dancer who eight years earlier had developed a dance notation named Sutton DanceWriting. The current standardized form of SignWriting is known as the International Sign Writing Alphabet (ISWA).

== History ==
Sutton originally created SignWriting in Denmark in the fall of 1974, at the request of professor Lars von der Lieth and others on his research team in the Audiology Research Group at the University of Copenhagen.

Sutton was asked to work on a research project, transcribing the gestures made by Danish hearing and Deaf people while they speak or sign. The project, part of a dissertation by Jan Enggaard Pedersen, showed that Danish Sign Language was a rich language, while the gestures of hearing people were unconnected with language.

Sutton's experience transcribing Danish sign language inspired her to work with Deaf people worldwide, helping them to write their own sign languages. She named the new writing system “SignWriting”.

SignWriting has since been used to write the sign languages of 40 countries. However, it is not clear how widespread its use is in each country.

Between 1986 and 1994 Sutton worked with a software developer to create SignWriter, a word processor for SignWriting which runs on MS-DOS computers. SignWriter included an integrated sign dictionary, and support for multiple languages and countries.

=== Use in Brazil ===
In 1996, Antonio Carlos da Rocha Costa, a professor at the Pontifical Catholic University of Rio Grande do Sul (PUCRS), discovered SignWriter and introduced it to his colleagues, beginning Brazil's institutional use of SignWriting.

In 2001, SignWriting was used in a Brazilian Sign Language dictionary containing more than 9,500 signs, which was published by the University of São Paulo.

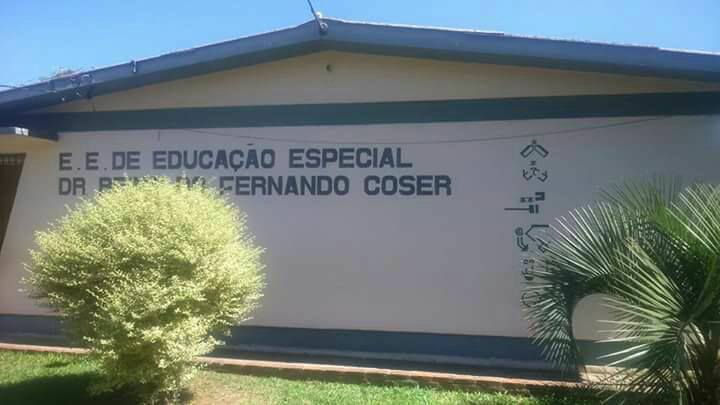
SignWriting displayed on the wall of a Deaf school in Brazil

In 2005, the Brazilian government issued Federal Decree 5626, which specified that Brazilian Sign Language be taught in universities and public schools, so it could serve as the primary language of instruction for Deaf students.

SignWriting is used to teach Brazilian Sign Language in 18 Federal Universities and 12 public schools in Brazil. In Germany, it is taught to deaf adults to improve their ability to read and write spoken German. There is also a German website dedicated to SignWriting.

== Symbols ==
SignWriting represents the positions and movements of your body. Because of this, the SignWriting symbols can be used to write any sign language, or even non-linguistic gestures.

SignWriting has 652 symbols, which are grouped into seven symbol classes: hands; movement; dynamics; head and faces; body; punctuation; and detailed location.

SignWriting includes so many symbols because it is designed to work with all sign languages, not just a single language. For instance, SignWriting has 261 hand symbols, but American Sign Language uses only 83 of them.

SignWriting has ten basic hand symbols, with all the remaining hand symbols being variations on the basic symbols.

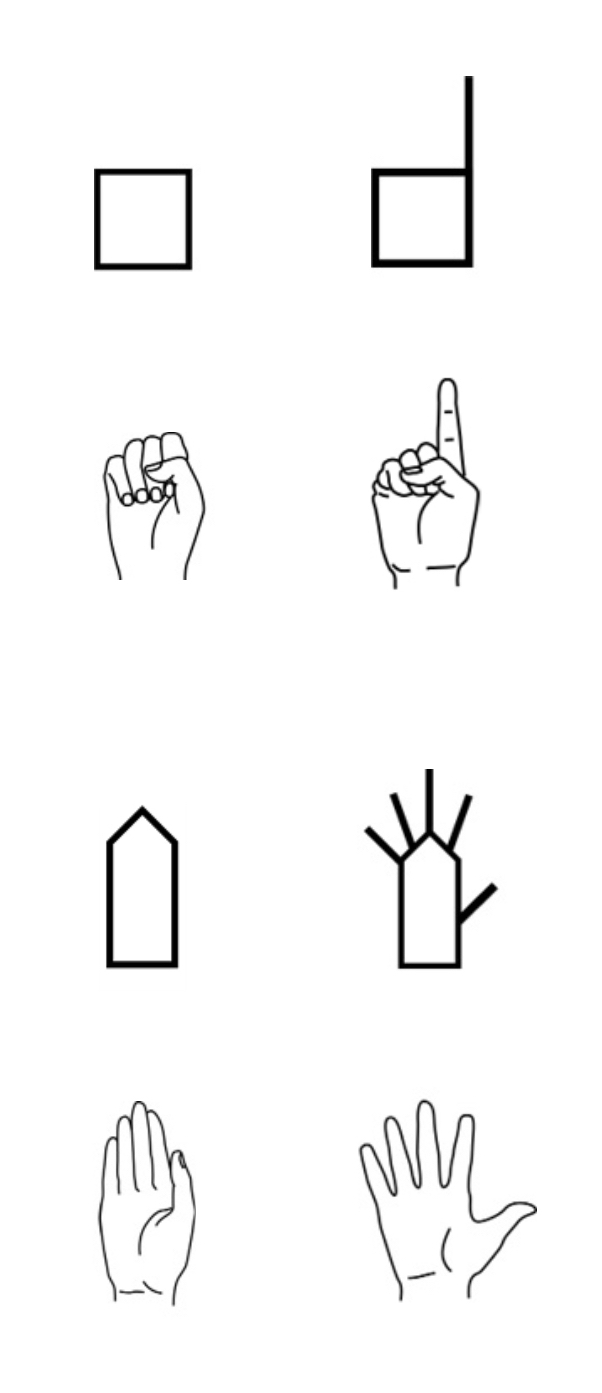

The hand and movement symbols can be modified to show additional information:

- Hand symbols can be filled in to show which direction the palm of the hand is facing.
- Movement symbol arrowheads can be filled in to show which hand is performing the movement.

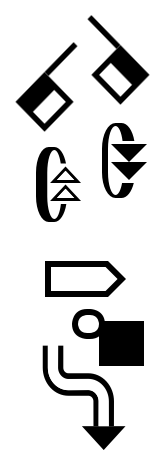

The SignWriting symbols are described in the standard textbook Lessons in SignWriting.

== Signs ==
In SignWriting a sign is a group of symbols, arranged two-dimensionally to represent the gestures made by a person signing the sign.

SignWriting has a number of rules for writing the symbols in a sign. These rules ensure that common patterns of gestures get written consistently across signs.

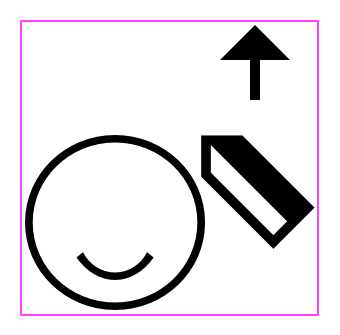
Sign box

Each written sign exists in a sign box, which is an invisible box just large enough to contain all the symbols in the sign. Just as a word consists of a line of letters, a sign consists of a box of symbols.

The size of a sign box is variable, and depends on the size and placement of the symbols in the box. This size can change when symbols are added to, deleted from, or moved within a sign.

Sign boxes are used by SignWriting software to align the signs that appear in a line of SignWriting text.

== Writing direction ==
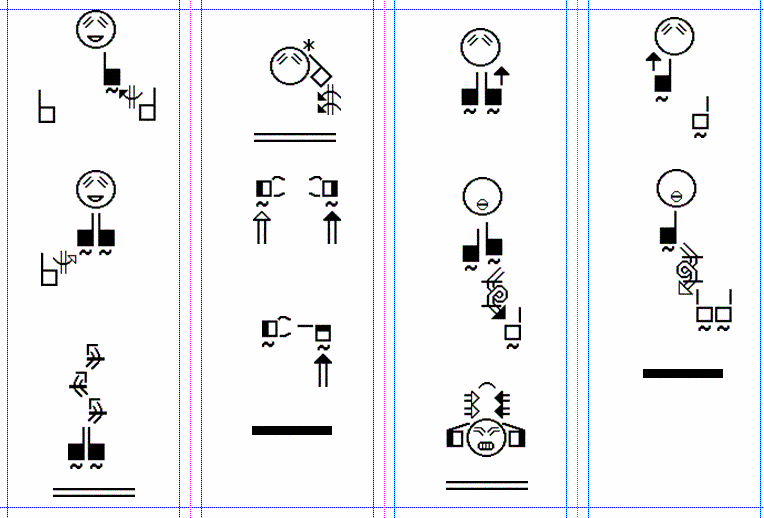
SignWriting text written vertically in columns

While SignWriting symbols are written two-dimensionally within each sign, the signs themselves are written in lines, either vertically in columns or horizontally in rows.

Vertical SignWriting is written top to bottom, with the columns written left to right. Horizontal SignWriting is written left to right, with the rows written top to bottom.

SignWriting text was originally written only horizontally. But after Deaf users reported that it felt more natural to write signs down the page, SignWriting was changed to conventionally write signs vertically.

This change yielded two benefits. First, the midline used to align vertically-written signs mimics the center line of the depicted signer's body, making the signs easier to read. Second, writing signs vertically simplifies the representation of body-shifting in sign language.

== Alphabetical order ==
SignWriting defines rules for how to sort signs in alphabetical order. But because the SignWriting alphabet contains so many symbols, and the symbols are arranged spatially in signs, SignWriting's ordering rules are more complex than those of the Roman alphabet.

SignWriting defines two sets of rules for alphabetical ordering: the Sign Spelling Sequence, and the Sign Symbol Sequence.

The Sign Spelling Sequence defines a linear order for the individual symbols in a sign. This order is specified manually by the sign author, and it remains with the sign as a non-visible attribute.

The Sign Symbol Sequence defines a sort order for lists of signs that have already been assigned individual Sign Spelling Sequences. This order is determined by various symbol properties, and the sign sorting is performed automatically by software.

== Handwriting ==
SignWriting was invented before personal computers, and for many years was written solely by hand. Various forms of hand-written SignWriting were created, including Block Printing, Handwriting, and Cursive.

When handwriting in Block Printing form, each SignWriting symbol is drawn as it appears in the textbook. Of the various hand-written forms, Block Printing is the easiest to read, and the most difficult to write. This difficulty is why some people consider SignWriting to be a cumbersome writing system.

Handwriting form is similar to Block Printing, but has been simplified to be more easily written by hand. Once Block Printing has been mastered, the Handwriting form can be learned quickly. Note that this form varies among writers, just as handwriting does in other languages.

Cursive form further simplifies Handwriting form to make writing even faster, by omitting certain symbols (such as the non-dominant hand) from each written sign.

Hand-written SignWriting continues to be taught and used, especially in educational settings based on chalkboards and paper.

== Software ==
While SignWriting can be written by hand, it is easier to use with software specifically designed for writing it.

SignPuddle and SignMaker are the standard software applications for using SignWriting. They work as web applications which run in a web browser.

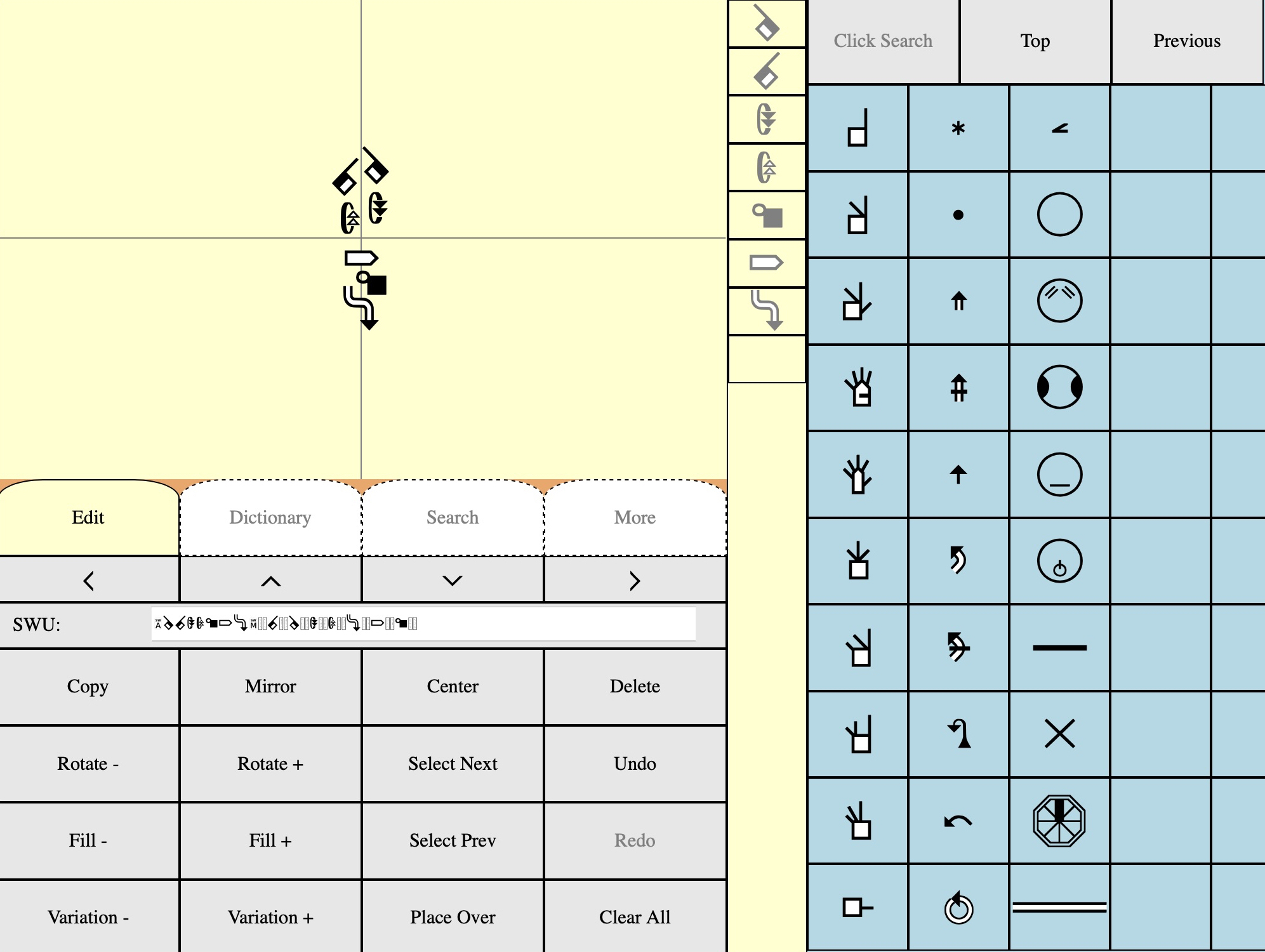
SignMaker application

SignPuddle is a document and dictionary editor for SignWriting. SignPuddle documents and dictionaries are stored in the cloud and can be shared among SignPuddle users. Documents and dictionaries can be exported from SignPuddle as PDF files. Signs can be exported as graphics files.

SignMaker is an editor for signs and dictionaries. Signs can be exported as graphics files, and dictionaries as text or JavaScript files. The SignMaker application run locally on a computer without an Internet link.

== Unicode ==
Unicode is a character encoding standard which was created so all of the world's writing systems could be used in any software application that supports the standard.

The SignWriting symbol set was added to the Unicode standard in 2015. The added symbols conform to the SignWriting ISWA standard.

However, the Unicode support for SignWriting is incomplete, because when the SignWriting symbols were added to Unicode, the Unicode system itself was not also updated to support writing systems that arrange their symbols two-dimensionally, as SignWriting does.

Because of this, SignWriting currently cannot be used in software that supports the Unicode standard, and existing SignWriting software uses an alternative standard for encoding SignWriting symbols.

A technical proposal has been submitted to the Unicode Consortium, detailing how to update the Unicode standard to fully support SignWriting.

== Advantages and disadvantages ==
SignWriting offers several advantages as a writing system:

- It is simple enough to be learned and used by children.
- It is precise enough to be used by linguists as a transcription system.
- It can be used to write any sign language.

However, it has a few disadvantages as well:

- It is harder to write than other writing systems, due to the large number of symbols, and the need to write them spatially. Using software simplifies writing, but entering signs into a computer is still slower than typing in other writing systems.
- It requires special software – because SignWriting is written spatially, it cannot be used in ordinary word processors and other applications that normally support multiple languages.
- Lack of institutional support – Brazil is the only country where SignWriting is taught in public schools and universities as part of the official curriculum.

== Research ==
SignWriting has served as both a tool in language research, and an object of study in educational research.

Here is a partial list of PhD theses on (or using) SignWriting:

- Abushaira, Mohamed (2007). "The Effect of SignWriting on the Achievement and Acquisition of Vocabulary by Deaf Students at 'Al-Amal School for the Deaf' in the City of Amman-Jordan" (PhD thesis). King Abdulaziz University.
- Bianchini, Claudia Savina (2012). "Metalinguistic analysis of the emergence of a sign language writing system: SignWriting and its application in Italian Sign Language (LIS)" (PhD thesis). University of Paris VIII * Vincenne Saint-Denis.
- Borgia, Fabrizio (2015). "Computerization of a graphic form of sign languages: application to the SignWriting writing system" (PhD thesis). Toulouse 3 * Paul Sabatier University.
- Bózoli, Daniele Miki Fujikawa (2021). "Bilingual education for the deaf: the use of SignWriting in learning Portuguese as a second language" (PhD thesis). Universidade Federal Santa Catarina.
- Brito, Ronnie Fagundes de (2013). "Reference model for developing artifacts to support deaf access to audiovisual media" (PhD thesis). Universidade Federal Santa Catarina.
- Flood, Cecilia Mary (2002). "How do Deaf and hard-of-hearing students experience learning to write using SignWriting, a way to read and write signs?” (PhD thesis). University of New Mexico.
- Galea, Maria (2014). "SignWriting (SW) of Maltese Sign Language (LSM) and its development into an orthography: Linguistic considerations" (PhD thesis). University of Malta.
- Gan, Lu (2011). "Real-time immersive human-computer interaction based on tracking and recognition of dynamic hand gestures" (PhD thesis). University of Central Lancashire.
- Moryossef, Amit (2023). "Real-time multilingual sign language processing" (PhD thesis). Bar-Ilan University.
- Pinto, Jorge Manuel Ferriera (2015). "SignWriting as a writing system appropriate to sign languages: a contribution to the development of writing skills of the deaf student?" (PhD thesis). Universidade do Porto.
- Stumpf, Marianne Rossi (2005). "The learning process of sign language writing through the SignWriting system: sign languages on paper and in the computer" (PhD thesis). Universidade Federal do Rio Grande do Sul.
- Wanderley, Débora Campos (2017). "Classification of verbs with agreement in Brazilian Sign Language: an analysis based on SignWriting" (PhD thesis). Universidade Federal Santa Catarina.

== Development ==
The SignPuddle and SignMaker applications are built on a set of JavaScript packages which manage SignWriting text, including display, searching, sorting, text flow, and other processing.

To support researchers and software developers who wish to build custom SignWriting applications, these packages are freely available under the MIT Open Source License.

The package @sutton-signwriting/core provides the following sign-processing commands:

- Complex feature-level searches of SignWriting text in documents and dictionaries, to support research in corpus linguistics.
- Tokenizers, to support machine learning models for SignWriting text, enabling applications such as sign language recognition and translation.

The package @sutton-signwriting/font-ttf includes the SignWriting symbol fonts, which are TrueType fonts distributed under the SIL Open Font License. Separately, Google distributes Noto Sans SignWriting, an OpenType font containing the Unicode SignWriting symbol set.

Formal SignWriting is the character encoding for SignWriting text, which provides the logical foundation for the JavaScript packages.

== See also ==
- Stokoe notation
- Hamburg Notation System (HamNoSys)
- International Movement Writing Alphabet (IMWA)
- ASL-phabet
- Si5s
