= Danish Sign Language =

Sign language used in Denmark

- Dansk tegnsprog
- Region: Denmark, Greenland, Faroe Islands
- Native speakers: 5,000 in Denmark proper; (2007) also in Greenland
- Language family: ? French sign: Danish Sign Language family; Danish Sign Language

Language codes
- ISO 639-3: dsl
- Glottolog: dani1246 DTS proper dani1289 DTS family
- ELP: Danish Sign Language

Danish Sign Language (Danish: Dansk tegnsprog, DTS) is the sign language used in Denmark.

== Classification ==
Henri Wittmann (1991) assigned DSL to the French Sign Language family because of similarities in vocabulary. Peter Atke Castberg studied deaf education in Europe for two years (1803–1805), including at l'Épée's school in Paris, and founded the first deaf school in Denmark in 1807, where Danish Sign Language (DTS) developed. The exact relationship between DTS and Old French Sign Language (VLSF) is not known; Castberg was critical of l'Épée's 'methodical signs' and also receptive to local sign language in 1807, and may thus have introduced signs from VLSF to a pre-existing local language (or home sign(s)) rather than derived DTS from VLSF itself. In any case, Castberg introduced a one-handed manual alphabet in 1808 that was based on the Spanish manual alphabet. In 1977, the Danish Deaf Association adopted 'the international manual alphabet', which was an almost exact copy of the American manual alphabet, with minor differences and additional signs for the æ, ø and å.

Norwegian Sign Language is generally thought to be a descendant of DSL. However, it may well be a mixture of DSL and indigenous sign, parallel to the situation between Swedish Sign Language and Finnish Sign Language.

Icelandic Sign Language is closer; 37% of a set of analyzed signs (Aldersson 2006) were completely different in structure and a further 16% were similar but not the same. Faroese Sign Language and Greenlandic Sign Language are more clearly dialects of DSL.

Danish Sign Language family tree

French Sign (c. 1760–present)	local/home sign
Danish Sign (c. 1800–present)
Faroese Sign (c. 1960–present)	Greenlandic Sign (c. 1950–present)	Icelandic Sign (c. 1910–present)	Norwegian Sign (c. 1820–present)
Malagasy Sign (c. 1950–present)

== See also ==
- Deafness in Denmark
