= Home sign =

Gestural communication system

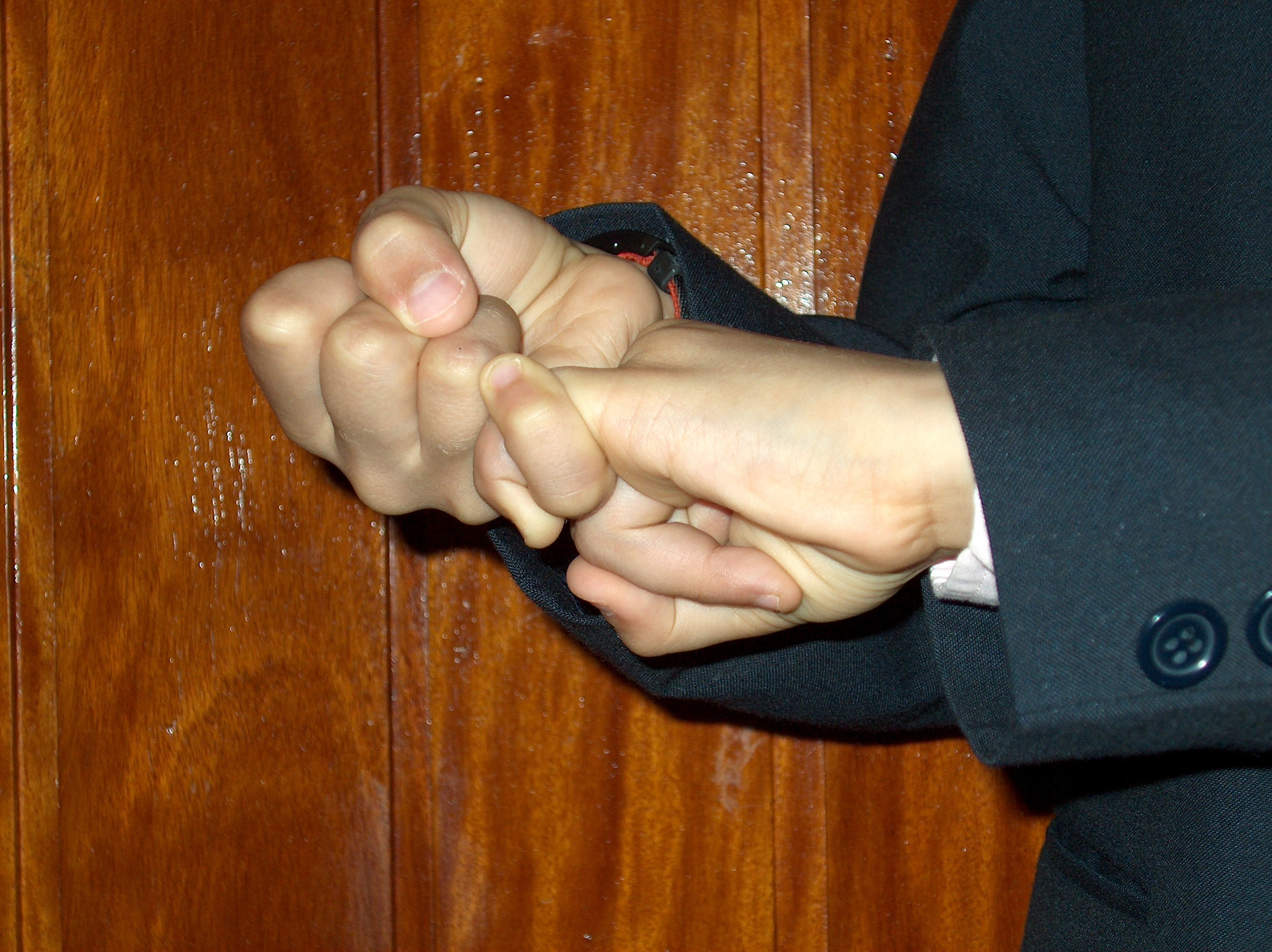
Picture of a Home Sign gesture

Home sign (or kitchen sign) is a gestural communication system, often invented spontaneously by a deaf child who lacks accessible linguistic input. Home sign systems often arise in families where a deaf child is raised by hearing parents and is isolated from the Deaf community. Because the deaf child does not receive signed or spoken language input, these children are considered linguistically isolated.

Because home sign systems are used regularly as the child's form of communication, they develop to become more complex than simple gestures. Though not considered to be a complete language, these systems may be classified as linguistic phenomena that show similar characteristics to signed and spoken language. Home sign systems display significant degrees of internal complexity, using gestures with consistent meanings, word order, and grammatical categories. Linguists have been interested in home sign systems as insight into the human ability to generate, acquire, and process language.

== Identifying features ==
In 1987, Nancy Frishberg set out a framework for identifying and describing home-based sign systems. She states that home signs differ from sign languages in that they:

- do not have a consistent meaning-symbol relationship (although later research has challenged this claim),
- do not pass on from generation to generation,
- are not shared by one large group,
- and are not considered the same over a community of signers.

However, there are certain "resilient" properties of language whose development can proceed without guidance of a conventional language model. More recent studies of deaf children's gestural systems show systematicity and productivity. Across users, these systems tend to exhibit a stable lexicon, word order tendency, complex sentence usage, and noun-verb pairs. They have also been shown to have the property of recursion, which allows systems to be generative. Deaf children may borrow spoken language gestures, but these gestures are altered to serve as linguistic markers. As the child develops, their utterances grow in size and complexity. Adult home signers use systems that mature to display more linguistic features than the simpler systems used by child home signers.

=== Lexicon ===
Studies of home signing children and adults show consistent pairing between the form of a gesture token and its meaning. These signs are also combined in compound gestures to create new words. The lack of bidirectionality in creation of home sign systems between the parent and child restricts the invention of signs with arbitrary meanings. The emergence of a conventionalized lexicon proceeds slower in a home sign system than in natural languages with a richer social network. A study of adult home signers in Nicaragua show that home signers use gestures to communicate about numbers, with cardinal numeral and non-cardinal numeral markings.

=== Morphology ===
Home sign systems have simple morphology. Gestures are composed of parts with a limited set of handshape forms. Hand shapes can be used in two ways: to represent a hand as it manipulates an object, or to represent the object itself. Morphophonological patterns in handshape production are more similar to conventionalized sign language handshapes than hearing individuals’ gestures. These handshapes are high in finger complexity for object handshapes and low in finger complexity for handling handshapes. Home signers also use handshape as a productive morphological marker in predicates, displaying a distinction between nominals and predicates. Study of adolescent home signers show ability to express motion events, though this strategy differs from conventional sign language. The motions of signs used in home sign systems can vary in length of path and directionality. Most of the hand shape morphemes could be found in combination with more than one motion morpheme, and vice versa.

=== Syntax ===
Within an individual system, home signers show consistency in a particular word order that distinguishes the subject of the utterance. Across home sign systems there is preference for action to be utterance-final. Structural dependency, words grouped based on a hierarchical structure or pattern, has been studied in Brazilian home signers who consistently produce modifiers with the noun modified. Gestural markers for negation (side to side head shake) and wh-form questions (manual flip) show consistent meaning, use, and position. Home signers mark grammatical subjects in sentences and are able to distinguish the subject from the topic of the sentence. These systems show some evidence of a prosodic system for marking phrase and utterance boundaries.

=== Narratives ===
Home signing children vary greatly in how often they display narrative skills; however, their narratives show similar structural patterns. This includes elaborating on basic narrative by including setting, actions, a complication, and temporal order. Hearing mothers produce co-narration with deaf children less frequently (than hearing mothers do with hearing children), and these contributions are spoken and rarely gestural.

== Conditions for emergence ==
The context of home sign system creation includes limited or no exposure to a spoken or signed language model, isolation from deaf children and adults, and parental choices regarding communication with the deaf child. Home sign creation is a common experience of deaf children in hearing families, as approximately 75% of hearing parents do not sign and communicate with their deaf children using a small set of gestures, speaking, and lipreading. In contrast, in a home with parents who are deaf or know sign language, a child can pick up the sign language in the same way a hearing child can pick up spoken language.

Home signs are a starting point for many sign languages. When a group of deaf people come together without a common sign language, they may share features of their individual home sign systems creating a village sign language that may establish itself as a complete language over time. However, home signs are rarely passed on to more than one generation, because they generally fade when the deaf child is exposed to language outside of the home.

Deaf children who use home sign are distinguished from feral children who are deprived of meaningful social and linguistic interaction. Home signing children are socially integrated to an extent with lack of conventional linguistic interaction. Home sign systems have some elements of language, and children who use these systems are able to acquire a natural sign language later in school.

=== Development of a home sign system ===
The deaf child is the creator of a home sign system. Mothers of adult home signers in Nicaragua were evaluated to determine their role in the development of their child's home sign system. The results of this study concluded that mothers comprehended spoken Spanish descriptions of events better than home sign descriptions, and native ASL signers performed better than mothers at understanding home sign productions. This suggests that mothers do not directly transmit home sign systems to their deaf children. Though caregivers' co-speech gestures may serve as an initial foundation for their child's home sign system, children surpass this input. Hearing caregivers typically do not share the same gestural communication system with the deaf child, using fewer gestures with less consistency and displaying different sentence-level patterns. A deaf child's gestural system is more likely to overlap with that of another home signer, including cross culturally.

Social network structure influences the development of a home sign system, impacting the conventionalization of referring expressions among members. Richly connected networks, where all participants interact with one another using the communication system, show greater and faster conventionalization. Home sign systems are typically sparsely connected networks, where the home signer communicates with each member of the network but the members do not use home sign to communicate with each other.

== Impact of lacking a language model ==
Studies by Deanna Gagne and Marie Coppola of perspective-taking abilities in adult home signers reveal that home signers do not pass experimental false-belief tasks, despite having visual observation of social interaction. False-belief understanding, integral to the development of theory of mind, requires lots of language experience and linguistic input. Further study of these adult home signers indicates that home signers show precursor abilities for theory of mind, such as visual perspective taking.

Lack of conventional language for numbers has been shown to affect numerical ability. In comparison to unschooled hearing and signing deaf individuals, adult home signers do not consistently produce gestures that accurately represent cardinal values of larger sets and do not exhibit effective use of finger counting strategies. Further study indicates home signers are able to recall gestures used as nouns, verbs, and adjectives, but they show poor number recall, which worsens as numbers increase.

== Cross-cultural comparisons ==
Syntactic structure is similar between groups of home signers in different cultures and geographical regions, including word order preferences and complex sentence usage. For example, home sign systems of children in Turkey and the United States exhibit similar patterns in sentence-level structure.

Certain gestures, such as pointing, head shaking, and shrugging, share similar meanings throughout cultures. Young children shake their heads to indicate negation before they express negative meanings through language. However, most young children use the head shake as an initial marker of negation, and replace it with speech or manual signs once language is acquired. Children using a home sign system do not have exposure to a structured language, and therefore do not replace the head shake with manual signs until language is acquired.

Home sign systems differ across cultures in terms of gesture use by hearing caregivers. Compared to American mothers, Chinese mothers show more similarity in gesture form (hand shape and motion) and syntax with systems used by their deaf children. In comparing narratives from Chinese and American deaf children, home signing children produce culturally appropriate narratives. Variability between home signers are group internal, with different individual home signers having their own set of gestures for the same type of object or predicate.

== See also ==
- Idioglossia
- Language deprivation in deaf and hard of hearing children
- Language isolate
