= Ukrainian Sign Language =

Sign language used in Ukraine

- Українська жестова мова Ukrainska zhestova mova
- Native to: Ukraine
- Native speakers: 54,000 (2015)
- Language family: French Sign: Austro-Hungarian Sign; Ukrainian Sign Language

Official status
- Regulated by: Department of Sign Language Education at the Institute of Special Education of National Academy of Educational Sciences of Ukraine

Language codes
- ISO 639-3: ukl
- Glottolog: ukra1235

Ukrainian Sign Language (abbreviated USL; Ukrainian: Українська жестова мова (УЖМ), romanized: Ukrainska zhestova mova (UZhM)) is the sign language of the deaf community of Ukraine. Ukrainian Sign Language belongs to the family of French sign languages.

== History and education ==
The teaching of Ukrainian Sign Language to deaf students began in the early 1800s, when a number of branches of the Vienna School for the Deaf were opened in Ukraine, namely the Institute for Deaf in Volyn in 1805 in Romaniv, then the Halychyna School for the Deaf in 1830 in Lviv and a few years later the Odesa School for the Deaf in 1843 in Odesa.

Under the Soviet Union, the development of teaching methods for Ukrainian sign language slowed down considerably, since the use of Ukrainian sign language in educational systems of the Soviet Union was banned soon after the negative feedback given by Joseph Stalin to sign languages in his 1950 article Marxism and Problems of Linguistics. In it, Stalin called deaf people "anomalous human beings" and described gesture language as "not a language at all, but a surrogate".

The use of Ukrainian sign language in educating deaf people in Ukraine didn't get reintroduced until 2006. As of 1 January 2015, there were 39 preschools for deaf children in Ukraine teaching pre-schoolers (6 years or younger); there were 61 specialized secondary schools for children with hearing impairments teaching deaf pupils ages 6 through 18 (this includes both day-time schools and boarding schools). However, most schools emphasize oral proficiency in Ukrainian and do not encourage use of USL.

From 2006 to 2016, the governing body that publishes language textbooks and research articles and regulates the methods of teaching Ukrainian sign language was the Laboratory of sign language at the Institute of Special Education of National Academy of Educational Sciences of Ukraine. It was established in 2006. In 2016 it was reorganized into the Department of Sign Language at the Institute of Special Education of National Academy of Educational Sciences of Ukraine.

Since the Russian invasion of February 2022, the expert committee at the Ukrainian Society of the Deaf has been working to derussify Ukrainian Sign Language and fingerspelling, eradicating Russianisms and other Russian influences that were forcibly imposed in the Soviet period and reconstructing historical signs, developing new signs and fingerspelling, and adopting international gestures.

French Sign Language family tree

Old French Sign Language (influenced by l'Epée c. 1760–1789)
French Sign Language (c. 1790–present)	Belgian Sign Language (c. 1790–2000)	Dutch Sign Language (c. 1790–present)	Austro-Hungarian Sign Language (c. 1780–1920)
American Sign Language (c. 1820–present)	French Belgian Sign Language (c. 1970–present)	Flemish Sign Language (c. 1970–present)	Italian Sign Language (c. 1830–present)
Austrian Sign Language (c. 1800–present)	Slovak Sign Language	Czech Sign Language (c. 1786–present)	Hungarian Sign Language	Ukrainian Sign Language (c. 1805–present)	Russian Sign Language (c. 1806–present)	Yugoslav Sign Language (c. 1840–present)
Bhutanese Sign Language	Black American Sign Language	Bolivian Sign Language	Costa Rican Sign Language	Jamaican Sign Language	Puerto Rican Sign Language	Dominican Sign Language

== NGOs ==
The Ukrainian Society of the Deaf (Ukrainian: Українське товариство глухих, УТОГ, UTOG) was established in 1933, and since 1957 has been a permanent member of the World Federation of the Deaf (WFD) as well as a member of the WFD Eastern Europe and Middle Asia Regional Secretariat. UTOG was established as an organization of Ukrainians with hearing impairments, both deaf and hearing-impaired ones, to provide them with assistance in their professional, labor and social rehabilitation, in protecting their lawful rights and interests and in asserting themselves as citizens that are fully integrated into society. Excluding hearing impaired in the temporarily Russia-occupied Ukrainian regions of Eastern Ukraine and Crimea, there were 43,108 registered Ukrainian nationals with hearing impairments as of 1 January 2015, of whom 38,746 persons are members of UTOG (approximately 90%).

== USL research ==
=== Ukrainian Sign Language Project ===
In 2007, the Western Canadian Centre of Studies in Deafness at the University of Alberta established the Ukrainian Sign Language Project, headed by Dr. Debra Russell, to support the recognition of USL as the language of instruction for Deaf children in Ukraine. Its outcomes were projected to document USL, create a USL teaching curriculum for teacher education and parents of Deaf children, formalize the training of interpreters, and improve the training of teachers of the Deaf.

=== Comparative linguistics studies ===
One 2005 study is suggestive of some sort of relationship between USL, Russian Sign Language (RSL), and Moldovan Sign Language (MSL), but does not provide any conclusive evidence that they are the same or different languages. In a 2005 study of Eastern European signed languages, a wordlist from Ukrainian Sign Language had about 70% similarity to wordlists from Russian Sign Language and Moldovan Sign Language. Noting that these three SLs had as high a lexical similarity as what was "found within certain countries, although not as high as what was found within ASL", the author recommended that "these countries should be investigated further to see how much difference there is between them: whether they represent different dialects of the same language or closely-related languages," and that future, more detailed, study should "use more precise measures such as intelligibility testing, rather than relying on wordlist comparisons alone." The study's closing remarks warn against inappropriate interpretation of the results, noting that "a preliminary survey of this sort is not meant to provide definitive results about the relatedness or identity of different languages. Besides the various caveats mentioned above, another important factor is that lexical similarity is only one facet of what is involved in comparing languages. Grammatical structure and other differences can be just as significant; two languages can have very similar vocabulary but enough other differences to make it difficult for people to communicate with each other."

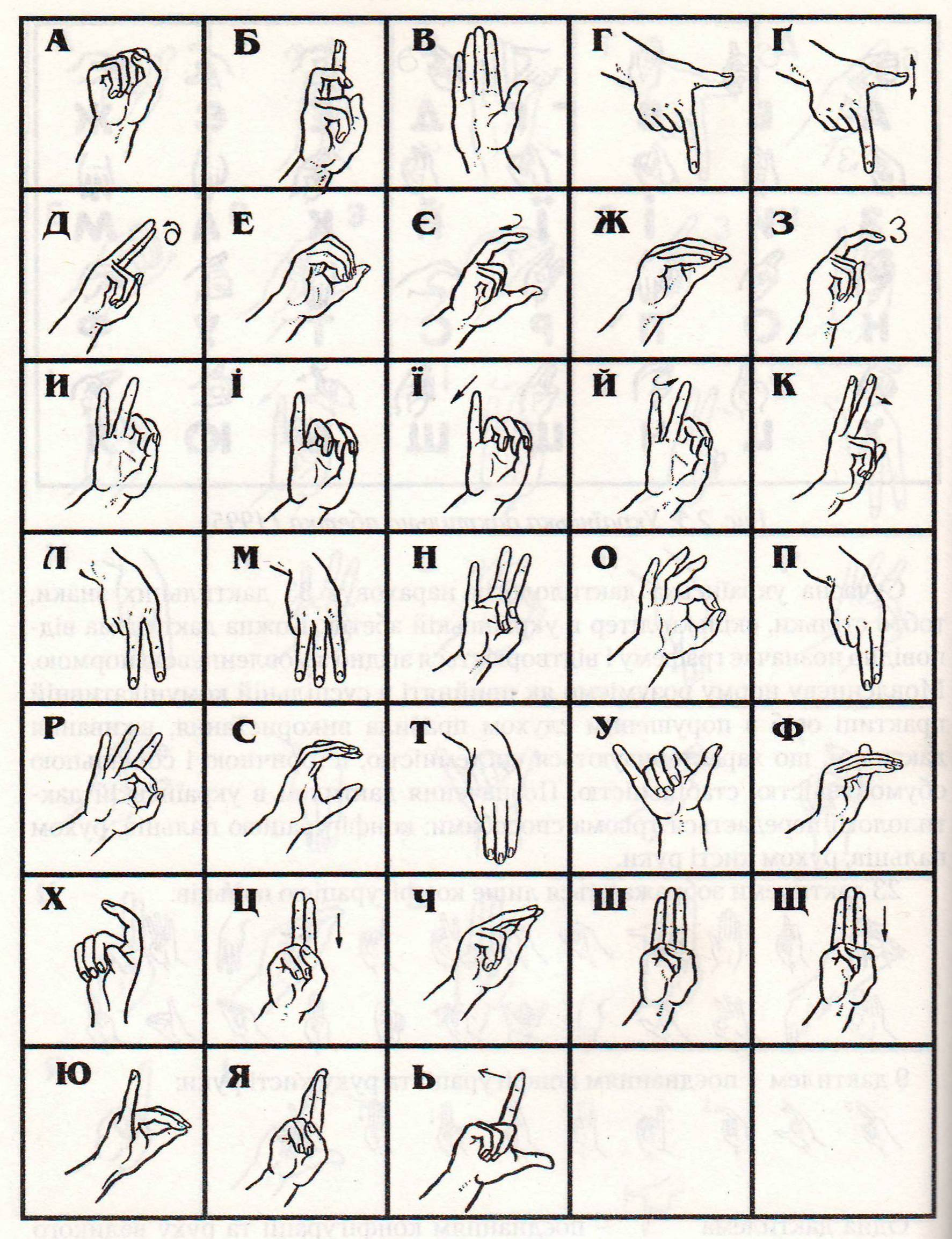
The Ukrainian manual alphabet.

== Fingerspelling ==
Ukrainian Sign Language uses a one-handed manual alphabet, or fingerspelling, based on the alphabet used in Old French Sign Language, but adapted to spell out words from the Ukrainian language. Known as the Ukrainian manual alphabet, it consists of 33 signs which make use of the 23 handshapes of USL. Some of these signs thus share handshapes; for example, the signs for Г & Ґ use the same handshape but in one the thumb is still, while in the other it moves up and down.

In USL as in other sign languages, fingerspelling serves as a type of borrowing from Ukrainian. It is used for proper nouns, for technical terms with no native USL equivalent, abbreviations of longer Ukrainian words, and some colloquial Ukrainian words. Fingerspelling may also be used instead of a synonymous sign for emphasis.

A common misconception is that USL consists only of fingerspelling. Although communication using only fingerspelling has been used, it is not USL.

== Use in films ==
- Плем'я (The Tribe) (2014), in which the actors solely communicate in USL. The film has neither translation, subtitles, nor a commentary.

== See also ==
- Ukrainian Manual Alphabet
- American Sign Language

== Relevant literature ==
- Bickford, J. Albert (2005). The Signed Languages of Eastern Europe. SIL International and University of North Dakota. p. 45.
- Lukyanova, S. P. (2001). Деякі аспекти розвитку нечуючих / Some issues in the development of nonhearing persons. Proceedings of the First Ukrainian Conference on the History of Deaf Education in Ukraine (pp. 216–218). Kyiv: UTOG (in Ukrainian)
- Russell, D. (2008). Ukrainian signed language: Bridging research and educational practice. Proceedings of the 2nd International Scientific Conference: The Ukrainian Diaspora in the Global Context Lʹviv. 2008. 277 pp. (p. 258 – 259).
- Kobel, Ihor (2009). Ukrainian hearing parents and their deaf children (doctoral dissertation). Edmonton: University of Alberta. p. 233. Archived from the original on 25 February 2016.
- Kulbida, S. V. (2009) "Ukrainian sign language as a natural notation system." scientific journal «Sign language and modern»: К.: Pedagogicha dumka (2009): 218–239.
- Krivonos, Yu G., et al. (2009) "Information technology for Ukrainian sign language simulation." Artificial Intelligence 3 (2009): 186–198.
- Davydov, M. V., I. V. Nikolski, and V. V. Pasichnyk. (2010) "Real-time Ukrainian sign language recognition system." Intelligent Computing and Intelligent Systems (ICIS), 2010 IEEE International Conference on. Vol. 1. IEEE, 2010.
- Davydov, M. V., et al. (2013) "Providing Feedback in Ukrainian Sign Language Tutoring Software." Rough Sets and Intelligent Systems-Professor Zdzisław Pawlak in Memoriam. Springer Berlin Heidelberg, 2013. 241–261.
