= Dutch Sign Language =

Predominant deaf sign language of the Netherlands

- Sign Language of the Netherlands (SLN); Nederlandse Gebarentaal (NGT)
- Native to: Netherlands
- Native speakers: 15,000 (2019)
- Language family: French Sign: Dutch Sign Language

Official status
- Recognised minority language in: Netherlands

Language codes
- ISO 639-3: dse
- Glottolog: dutc1253
- ELP: Dutch Sign Language

A Dutch Sign Language speaker, recorded in the Netherlands.

Dutch Sign Language (Dutch: Nederlandse Gebarentaal or NGT; Sign Language of the Netherlands or SLN) is the predominant sign language used by deaf people in the Netherlands.

Although the same spoken Dutch language is used in the Netherlands and Flanders, the Dutch Sign Language (NGT) is not the same as Flemish Sign Language (VGT). They do have the late 18th-century Old French Sign Language as their common ancestor, but have diverged during the subsequent 200 years, so that mutual intelligibility between modern users has been greatly reduced.

== History ==
=== Origins ===
French Sign Language family tree

Old French Sign Language (influenced by l'Epée c. 1760–1789)
French Sign Language (c. 1790–present)	Belgian Sign Language (c. 1790–2000)	Dutch Sign Language (c. 1790–present)	Austro-Hungarian Sign Language (c. 1780–1920)
American Sign Language (c. 1820–present)	French Belgian Sign Language (c. 1970–present)	Flemish Sign Language (c. 1970–present)	Italian Sign Language (c. 1830–present)
Austrian Sign Language (c. 1800–present)	Slovak Sign Language	Czech Sign Language (c. 1786–present)	Hungarian Sign Language	Ukrainian Sign Language (c. 1805–present)	Russian Sign Language (c. 1806–present)	Yugoslav Sign Language (c. 1840–present)
Bhutanese Sign Language	Black American Sign Language	Bolivian Sign Language	Costa Rican Sign Language	Jamaican Sign Language	Puerto Rican Sign Language	Dominican Sign Language

The origins of Dutch Sign Language (NGT) are traceable to Old French Sign Language (VLSF), a term for the sign language that the community of about 200 deaf Parisians used amongst themselves in the mid-18th century. The abbot Charles-Michel de l'Épée wanted to give them religious education, and thus learnt their language, after which he made some adjustments of it himself. Around 1760, he opened a school for the deaf in Paris, the predecessor of the current Institut National de Jeunes Sourds de Paris. Educators from all over Europe came to this and later French schools for the deaf in order to adopt l'Épée's teaching method, and introduce it in their own countries. Therefore, this Old French Sign Language as modified by l'Épée spread across Europe, North America and other continents and became the basis of most modern sign languages, including Dutch Sign Language. The Walloon preacher Henri Daniel Guyot, born in Blegny, studied in Franeker, and preached in the Walloon church of Groningen since 1777. In 1790, he founded the Henri Daniel Guyot Instituut, the first Dutch school for the deaf, after the example of l'Épée, who he had visited in France.

=== Dialect formation in early schools for the deaf ===
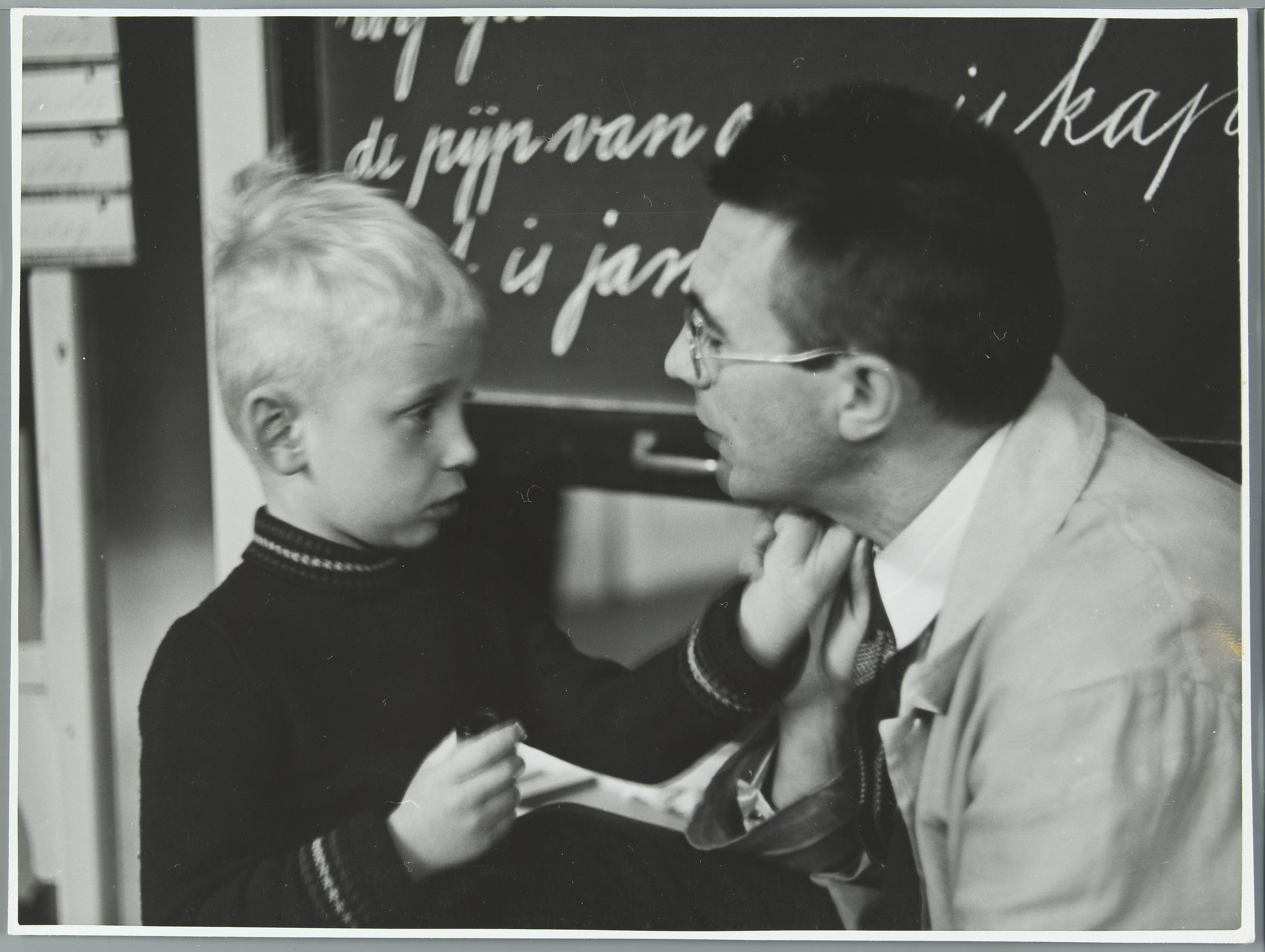
Education for the deaf-and-mute in Amsterdam (1938). Pupil in front of the class feels the educator's larynx move when making sounds.

Before the standardisation of the sign language several regional variants were used in the Netherlands and the use of signs was discouraged in order to stimulate deaf people to acquire self-reliance. In the 1900–1980 period, the use of signs was prohibited in education as a consequence of the Milan Conference of 1880. Instead, the oralist method (also called the 'German method') was practiced: deaf people were instructed to learn to speak by imitating hearing people by lip reading, feeling how they used their larynx to make sounds that they were then tasked to imitate. Nevertheless, deaf people continued to use signs amongst themselves, leading to the rise of five dialects within and around the five schools for the deaf Groningen, Rotterdam, Amsterdam, Voorburg and Sint-Michielsgestel.

Region	Dialect-forming school for the deaf	
Amsterdam	Vereniging voor Doofstommenonderwijs in Amsterdam (1910–1994), Signis (1994–2009)	Kentalis (2009–present)
Groningen	Henri Daniel Guyot Instituut (1790–2002), Koninklijke Effatha Guyot Groep (2002–2009)	Kentalis (2009–present)
Sint-Michielsgestel	Instituut voor Doven (1814–2003), Viataal (2003–2009)	Kentalis (2009–present)
Voorburg (1926–2000); Zoetermeer (1980–present)	Christelijk Instituut Effatha (1888–2002), Koninklijke Effatha Guyot Groep (2002–2009)	Kentalis (2009–present)
Rotterdam	Koninklijke Ammanstichting (1853–2002), Koninklijke Auris Groep (2002–present)	

=== Standardisation ===
As of 1995, more and more schools for the deaf in The Netherlands teach Signed Dutch (Nederlands met Gebaren). This uses the grammar of Dutch rather than NGT.

=== Recognition ===
In September 2019, D66, PvdA and CU proposed a bill of law initiative for official recognition of NGT. Since 13 October 2020 has been officially recognised.

== Education ==
There are currently five schools for deaf children in the country, with the first being built at the end of the 18th century and the rest between the end of the 19th century and the beginning of the 20th century. While the first school used a manual method to teach the language, signing was originally prohibited in each of the latter schools and they instead tended to use an oral method of teaching. Today, because of cochlear implants, education is consistently leaning towards oralist methods.

== See also ==
- Fingerspelling
- Legal recognition of sign languages
- List of sign languages
- Sign Language Studies (journal)
