= Italian Sign Language =

Sign language of Italy

- Lingua dei Segni Italiana
- Region: Italy, San Marino, Switzerland
- Native speakers: 40,000 (2013)
- Language family: French sign: Italian Sign Language

Language codes
- ISO 639-3: ise – inclusive code Individual code: slf – Swiss-Italian SL
- Glottolog: ital1288
- ELP: Swiss-Italian Sign Language

Italian Sign Language (Italian: Lingua dei segni italiana, LIS) is the visual language used by deaf people in Italy. Deep analysis of it began in the 1980s, along the lines of William Stokoe's research on American Sign Language in the 1960s. Until the beginning of the 21st century, most studies of Italian Sign Language dealt with its vocabulary. According to the European Union for the Deaf, the majority of the 60,000–90,000 Deaf people in Italy use LIS.

== Language structure and language family ==
Like many sign languages, LIS is in some ways different from its "spoken neighbor"; thus, it has little in common with spoken Italian, but shares some features with non-Indo-European oral languages (e.g. it is verb final, like the Basque language; it has inclusive and exclusive pronominal forms like oceanic languages; interrogative particles are verb final (You go where?).

A sign variety of spoken Italian also exists, the so-called Signed Italian which combines LIS lexicon with the grammar of spoken Italian: this is not Italian Sign Language, however.

Some features of LIS are typical of sign languages in general, e.g. agreement between nouns, adjectives and verbs is not based on gender (masculine, feminine, neuter) but it is based on place, that is the spatial position in which the sign is performed: nouns can be placed everywhere in the space but their position must be consistent with that of pronouns and verbs. The LIS translation of the sentence "The child speaks to the mother" appears as Child-here mother-there this-speak-that, rather than involving forms like "he, she". The voice intonation is replaced by facial expressions which mark interrogative sentences, imperatives and relative clauses. Other features of Italian Sign Language which can be found also in oral languages are: classifiers; dual, trial, quattrial and even quinquial forms in addition to the general plural; verbs inflected for person.

The most detailed analysis of a part of the grammar of LIS is by Chiara Branchini, On Relativization and Clefting: An Analysis of Italian Sign Language. Laura Fedeli has described sociolinguistic features of LIS, including differences in use by gender. There are also some deafblind in Italy who use a form of tactile sign language.

French Sign Language family tree

Old French Sign Language (influenced by l'Epée c. 1760–1789)
French Sign Language (c. 1790–present)	Belgian Sign Language (c. 1790–2000)	Dutch Sign Language (c. 1790–present)	Austro-Hungarian Sign Language (c. 1780–1920)
American Sign Language (c. 1820–present)	French Belgian Sign Language (c. 1970–present)	Flemish Sign Language (c. 1970–present)	Italian Sign Language (c. 1830–present)
Austrian Sign Language (c. 1800–present)	Slovak Sign Language	Czech Sign Language (c. 1786–present)	Hungarian Sign Language	Ukrainian Sign Language (c. 1805–present)	Russian Sign Language (c. 1806–present)	Yugoslav Sign Language (c. 1840–present)
Bhutanese Sign Language	Black American Sign Language	Bolivian Sign Language	Costa Rican Sign Language	Jamaican Sign Language	Puerto Rican Sign Language	Dominican Sign Language

== History of LIS and LIS education ==
The Romans, along with most of Europe, inherited from Greece the notion that thought corresponds with the spoken word and thereby believed that deaf-mute individuals possessed lower intelligence and ability to reason. The first time that deafness was officially recognized in law and different types of deafness were differentiated, including distinguishing it from muteness, occurred under Emperor Justinian (527-565 CE). This provided at least some deaf for the first time with legal rights, though these deaf most likely concerned those deafened postlingually ( p. 238-9).

During the Middle Ages, these legal rights were severely restricted because the deaf could not serve feudal lords their military interests. The restrictions the deaf faced included losing the right to inheritance, to celebrate mass and to marry ( p. 239). Furthermore, two medical theories regarding deafness were common throughout the Middle Ages. One idea was that muteness was a defect of the tongue, to be cured by healing the tongue. Another idea was that the ability to hear was related to the mouth via a tube in the ear, to be cured by shouting in the mouth.

The first Italian text mentioning deaf people's ability to reason and to use their intellect, through signing or other means, was of the legal advisor Bartolo della marca c'Ancona early in the 14th century ( p. 240). This more positive look at deafness was continued with the onset of the Renaissance. The invention of the printing press and, hence, the widespread availability of books stimulated general interest in education practices and this entailed several positive developments for the deaf. ( p. 240)

The first Italian teacher of deaf pupils was Pedro Ponce de León (1520-1584 CE), a Benedictine monk. This was likely related to Benedictines their long tradition of holding silence and using signs to communicate. This was a tradition possibly dating back to the establishment of the vow of silence by St. Benedict in 529 CE in a town near Naples. In fact, the first recorded signs of this language date back to the 11th century. Interestingly, Benedictines also struggled with maintaining an 'official' set of signs for all Benedictines and with the continued arising of "unofficial" signs in the separate monasteries. ( p. 242-3)

The first Italian school for the deaf was founded by Tommaso Silvestri in the late 18th century. His teaching used a signing or manualist method inspired by the teaching practices of the famous Parisian educator of the deaf Abbé de l'Épée. Tommaso Silvestri had traveled to France and had seen the use of the signing method first hand ( p. 243). In 1793, Tommaso Silvestri wrote that signs stimulate the intelligence of the deaf and should be adopted in education.

In Italian texts of this time, the signing used by the deaf was always referred to as la lingua dei gesti ("the language of gestures"). That is, the use of the term "language" to describe deaf their means of communication reveals the respectable status sign language was given at this time. For example, in 1857, Ciro Marzullo wrote La grammatica pei sordo-muti ("The grammar for the deaf-mute"), a textbook describing and illustrating various signs which can aid to learn written languages and parts of speech. Moreover, in 1885, D. Gaminiano Borasari, an instructor of deaf-mute in Modena, wrote Principi generali dell'istruzione del Sordo-Muto nella lingua italiana ("A Guide to the teaching of Italian language to the deaf-mute"). The headings of the first chapter are very indicative of his attitude towards the deaf: "1. the deaf-mute, though speechless, use their reason, 2. they have a language, 3. what does it consist of, and 4. the necessity of learning the language of the deaf for instructing them". This culminates in writings of that period left by deaf authors and various references to deaf. In particular, it seems that deaf were involved themselves in education for the deaf.

Notable is that only one historical deaf school was founded by a deaf person. This is notable particularly for its location, Milan, because this is where the infamous Conference of Milan was held in 1880. At the conference 164 education delegates – all hearing bar one – declared the oral method as a superior means of instructing the deaf over the manual method.

In the period after the Conference of Milan, there is no longer any mention of a "language" of the deaf. Rather, the focus shifts to teaching the spoken word and, specifically, the national language. By 1920 the program of education was still firmly oral. Nevertheless, various Associations of the Deaf were founded and the leaders of these organizations were usually deaf themselves. One of the few references to 'signing' in this period concern a reference to the Swedish mimicking language or mimicking method (linguaggio mimico o di metodo mimico), but this does not come close to the sign language referred to by Borasari or Marzullo.

Two factors have been proposed to explain the enormous influence and success of the Milan Conference in establishing the oral method. Firstly, German 'science' and thinking was very influential for Italy at this period in time and the oralist method was more established in German history. Secondly, the Italian unification (c. 1815-1870) entailed nationalism and a single language was deemed as key to uniformity ( p. 237-8). For the role of language in national education see in particular Branson and Miller ( p. 5).

At the end of the 20th century, mainstreaming became very influential. Mainstreaming is trying to give deaf the same education as hearing by placing them in the same type of schools. This entailed that separate deaf education deteriorated to some extent.

== Official status of LIS ==
On May 19, 2021, Italy officially recognized LIS.

Often a first step in the official recognition of a language is the formalization of a grammar and a lexicon, the latter in the form of a dictionary. It is unclear when the first full LIS dictionary was produced, but at least by now various LIS dictionaries exist. For example, one not-for-profit foundation aimed at improving the living conditions of the deaf and deaf-blind offers a bilingual dictionary with both written Italian and visual depiction of signs in book form. Another notable example is an online electronic dictionary where the meanings of all the signs are both written down in Italian and signed in LIS using video. This particular dictionary is a project of the European Academy of Bozen/Bolzano, an independent research institute with linguistic research as one of its five main goals.

The formalization and recognition of an official grammar is, nevertheless, somewhat more problematic. Even today, people usually consider LIS "a 'grammarless' language," necessitating a scholar to write his dissertation in 2006 with the aim "to provide evidence that LIS . . . does have its own grammar" ( p. 1). That is not to say, however, that academics are generally passive in the study of LIS. Porcari and Volterra published an extensive overview of academic literature related to LIS covering all possible fields from history to psychology, revealing an active role of the academic world.

Until 2021, LIS was not officially recognized ( p. 1) even though the state of Italy has a tradition of recognizing minority languages. In 1999 the following minority languages were officially recognized: Albanian, Catalan, German, Greek, Croatian, French, Franco-Provençal, Friulian, Ladin, Occitan, Sardinian and Slovene. Also, Italy signed the European Charter for Regional or Minority Languages in 2000, although it has not as yet ratified it and it is also not clear which specific languages Italy considers for inclusion in the ratification. Nevertheless, the Italian state has indirectly recognized LIS in acts and laws. For example, there are two laws (no. 104/92 and no. 17/99) in which sign language and sign language users are indirectly referred to ( p. 3, 19).

There is, however, an official qualification awarded by the Ministry for Public Instruction for Support Teachers for teachers of LIS. Teachers qualify if they have a certain degree of knowledge of LIS (as set down in law no. 104/92). These communication assistants have to facilitate communication between deaf students, their classmates and teachers and is part of a broader European project to better the position of the deaf ( p. 30-31).

In April 2003, the Council of Europe encouraged the 45 member states to improve the position of sign languages in television broadcasting and to stimulate the subtitling of television programs. In Italy this has resulted in the closed captioning of two national television programs and that daily three news segments are interpreted with LIS ( p. 39-40)

== Education ==
There are three possible approaches education policy for students with 'special' education needs: firstly, a one-track approach where it is attempted to include all pupils within mainstream education, secondly, a multi-track approach where mainstream and special education systems exist next to each other with an attempt to link the two and, thirdly, a two-track approach where two distinct education systems exist and in which pupils with special educational needs are placed in special schools ( p. 24-5).

As noted earlier, the recent trend in Italy, in line with the trend in the European Union, is the first approach – to include deaf students in mainstream schools. In Italy this is facilitated by providing teacher with supplementary materials and training. Relatively speaking, Italy started much earlier with developing and implementing inclusive policies than most other countries, resulting in a relatively mature program ( p. 24-5).

However, learning LIS is generally not part of following mainstream education, but is only offered by private or state-owned schools specifically for the Deaf. "No opportunity is granted to the Deaf to learn Italian Sign Language, or especially to know other Deaf persons, while they attend the hearing school" ( p. 227). However, law no. 517/1977 guarantees parents the freedom to choose to which school they send their children, be it public schools together with hearing children or to schools specifically for the deaf (Corazza 1991). In total 25 deaf schools exist in Italy, offering various different teaching methods, depending on the school: sign language, oral and bilingual education. [The school founded by Tommasso Silverstri still exists.] However, it seems that more parents are starting to favor bilingual education: "In Italy, increasing numbers of families are choosing a bilingual education for their deaf child (LIS and Italian)" ( p. 28).

This call seems to have been quite successful. True bilingual education programs for the deaf were set up in various cities (at least one in Turin, Genoa and Rome) in cooperation with deaf teachers. Moreover, placing LIS competent and often deaf classroom assistants in nursery and elementary schools has somewhat been supported by the national government or local government agencies. Moreover, it is now promoted by the government to place more than one deaf child in any mainstream classroom. Moreover, law no. 17 of 28/01/1999 guarantees funding for LIS competent tutors at universities. Finally, law no. 104/92 provides for the presence of LIS interpreters, though the source does not specify under what conditions ( p. 28).

== Signing community ==
An important marker for the status of a signing community is the existence and viability of a national association for the deaf. An Italian National Association of the Deaf (Ente Nazionale per la protezione e l'assistenza dei Sordi) was founded in 1932 and became a full member of the European Union of the Deaf in 1985. Objectives of this not-for-profit foundation include promoting social inclusion, protecting their moral, civil, cultural and economic rights and promoting their dignity and full autonomy in all matters of life. The president and all six board members are deaf, though the only staff member, the executive director, is hearing. The foundation estimates that about 60,000 deaf live in Italy of which 32,000 are member of the foundation.

On the strength of the community the Italian National Association of the Deaf reports the following facts. The foundation proposed draft bills to the government to recognize LIS as an official language and this was actually pre-approved by the Council of Ministers, but it was later suspended due to a political crisis. Moreover, two main sign language interpreter associations, ANIOS and ANIMU, co-exist in Italy that offer 82 and 200 interpreters, respectively. Furthermore, there are 103 provincial and 19 regional deaf clubs and there is a separate youth section within the foundation.

Furthermore, the activities of several other parties for the Deaf are notable. Firstly, a website offering an encyclopedic service, comparable to Wikipedia the Free Encyclopedia, based on LIS video lectures is available. Although somewhat outdated due to the rising popularity of mobile phones, a text-to-speech telephone service is still available in most parts of Italy as of 2011.

However, there is still today a very popular view that sign language is not a full language. Some believe LIS is absolutely necessary to develop deaf children's full intelligence and potential, while others believe that being able to write and speak Italian is key for children to develop fully (, 228). Those who became deaf or hard of hearing at a later age often promote the hybrid communication where signing is only serves to sign the spoken language. Such languages are Sign Supported Italian and Exact Signed Italian ( p. 50-1).

Finally, the status of the signing community is also related to the extent to which deaf are involved in research on deafness and their own community. In a 2001 study on the educational development of preschoolers in a footnote it is mentioned that "A key element of the project was the involvement of native LIS signers, deaf colleagues, and LIS interpreters at almost all stages in the planning and execution of the research" ( p. 49).

== See also ==
- Gesticulation in Italian – Form of nonverbal communication

== Relevant Literature ==
- Volterra, Virginia, Maria Roccaforte, Alessio Di Renzo, and Sabina Fontana. Italian Sign Language from a Cognitive and Socio-semiotic Perspective: Implications for a general language theory. (2022). John Benjamins.
