= Legal recognition of sign languages =

Map of legal recognition of sign languages. Countries which officially recognise a national sign language Countries which do not recognise a national sign language

The legal recognition of signed languages differs widely. In some jurisdictions (countries, states, provinces or regions), a signed language is recognised as an official language; in others, it has a protected status in certain areas (such as education). Although a government may stipulate in its constitution (or laws) that a "signed language" is recognised, it may fail to specify which signed language; several different signed languages may be commonly used.

The most frequently used framework for the legal recognition of sign languages, adopted and further developed by the World Federation of the Deaf, was developed by Dr Maartje De Meulder.

Extending legal recognition is a major concern of Deaf culture. Symbolic recognition does not guarantee an improvement in the lives of signed-language users, and it has been argued that signed languages should be supported not merely as an accommodation for disabled people, but as a communication medium in language communities.

== Status by country ==
=== Argentina ===
Argentine Sign Language was officially recognized by the government of Argentina in 2023.

=== Australia ===
Auslan was recognised by the Australian government as a "community language other than English" and the preferred language of the Deaf community in 1987 and 1991 policy statements. Although the recognition does not ensure the provision of services in Auslan, its use in Deaf education and by Auslan-English interpreters is becoming more common.

It is now increasingly recognised that signing deaf people constitute a group like any other non-English speaking language group in Australia, with a distinct sub-culture recognised by shared history, social life and sense of identity, united and symbolised by fluency in Auslan, the principal means of communication within the Australian Deaf Community.

— Australia's Language: The Australian Language and Literacy Policy (page 20). (Australian Government Publishing Service, Canberra, 1991)

=== Austria ===
Austrian Sign Language (Österreichische Gebärdensprache, or ÖGS) was recognised by the Austrian Parliament in 2005. On 1 September 2005, the Constitution of Austria was amended to include a new article: §8 (3) Die Österreichische Gebärdensprache ist als eigenständige Sprache anerkannt. Das Nähere bestimmen die Gesetze. ("Austrian Sign Language is recognised as an independent language. The laws will determine the details.")

=== Belgium ===
==== French Community ====
Belgium's Parliament of the French Community recognised French Belgian Sign Language (LSFB) by decree in October 2003. The recognition entails:

1. cultural (symbolic) recognition
2. the formation of a commission to advise the Government of the French Community in all LSFB-related matters

According to the Décret relatif à la reconnaissance de la langue des signes (Decree on the Recognition of Sign Language), "It concerns a generic recognition that goes hand-in-hand with a general measure, permitting every minister to take action in fields relative to his authority."

==== Flemish Community ====
Flemish Sign Language (Dutch: Vlaamse Gebarentaal or VGT) was recognised on 24 April 2006 by the Flemish Parliament. The recognition entails:

1. a cultural (symbolic) recognition
2. the formation of a commission to advise the Flemish government on all VGT-related matters
3. funding of VGT research and development

Cultural recognition entails that the Flemish Government recognises the Flemish Sign Language as the language of the Deaf Community in Flanders. This 'recognition' encompasses the following three meanings: (1) the Flemish Government acknowledges the correctness of the fact that the Flemish Sign Language is the language of the Deaf Community in Flanders, (2) the Flemish Government also accepts the existence of this language in the judicial domain and treats it accordingly and (3) the Flemish Government expresses its respect for this language.

==== German-speaking Community ====
German Sign Language was legally recognised in 2019 by the Parliament of the German-speaking Community.

=== Brazil ===
Although Brazilian Sign Language (LIBRAS) was legally recognised in 2002, a 2005 law stipulated that it could not replace written Portuguese. The language must be taught as a part of the speech-language pathology curriculum, and LIBRAS is an elective undergraduate subject.

=== Canada ===
Maritime Sign Language (MSL), which derives from British Sign Language, is moribund in Canada's Maritime provinces. It is not officially recognised, and has been replaced by ASL in schools. The Halifax School for the Deaf, which operated from 1856 to June 1961, taught in MSL; after that, the Interprovincial School for the Education of the Deaf (later renamed the Atlantic Provinces Special Education Authority, or APSEA) in Amherst, Nova Scotia, took over until it closed in 1995.

Inuit Sign Language (IUR), used in Canada's Arctic communities, was developed locally by families and communities for their deaf families and community members.

==== Federal ====
The Accessible Canada Act (ACA), passed on 21 June 2019, recognised "American Sign Language (ASL), Quebec Sign Language and Indigenous sign languages (...) as the primary languages for communication by deaf persons in Canada."

The ACA only recognises ASL at the federal level.

==== Provincial and Territorial ====
- Alberta
  - The Legislative Assembly passed a motion recognising ASL as a language of instruction.
- Manitoba
  - Manitoba has legally recognised ASL since 1988.
- Ontario
  - The Ontario Education Act sanctions the use of ASL and Langue des signes québécoise as languages of instruction in all schools for deaf students in Ontario.
- Saskatchewan
  - The Accessible Saskatchewan Act recognises ASL and indigenous sign languages states that "Sign languages are recognized as the primary languages for communication by deaf persons in Saskatchewan"
- Nunavut
  - Nunavut considered giving Inuit IUR legal status. IUR made its debut in the Nunavut legislature in 2008.

=== China ===
Chinese Sign Language has no formal legal protection.

=== Chile ===
Chilean Sign Language (Spanish: Lengua de Señas Chilena or LSCh), was enacted as Law No. 20,422 in 2010 to ensure equal opportunity for disabled people. The law recognises sign language as the natural means of communication for the deaf community.

=== Czech Republic ===
Czech Sign Language gained legal recognition with the passage of the Sign Language Law, 155/1998 Sb ("Zákon o znakové řeči 155/1998 Sb").

=== Cyprus ===
Cypriot Sign Language was recognised as a language equivalent to Greek.

=== Denmark ===
Danish Sign Language gained legal recognition on 13 May 2014. The Danish Parliament established the Danish Sign Language Council "to devise principles and guidelines for the monitoring of the Danish sign language and offer advice and information on the Danish sign language."

=== European Union ===
The European Parliament unanimously approved a resolution about sign languages on 17 June 1988. The resolution suggests that all member states recognise their sign languages as official languages of the Deaf community.

The European Parliament [...] calls on the Commission to make a proposal to the Council concerning official recognition of the sign language used by deaf people in each Member State.

The EP issued another resolution in 1998, with essentially the same content as the 1988 resolution. A third resolution was passed in 2016. It was drafted by Helga Stevens, Europe's first deaf female MEP and president of the European Union of the Deaf from 2005 to 2007. The resolution, on sign language and professional sign-language interpreters, draws on Deaf studies and linguistics.

=== France ===
French Sign Language has been recognised since 2005 under Act No. 2005-102.

=== Finland ===
Finnish Sign Language was recognised in the constitution in August 1995:

Section 17 - Right to one's language and culture [...] The rights of persons using sign language and of persons in need of interpretation or translation aid owing to disability shall be guaranteed by an Act.

— The Constitution of Finland

=== Germany ===
German Sign Language was officially recognised in April 2002, from the perspective of it being a language of a disability group, but not from the perspective of it being a language of a cultural minority.

==== Berlin ====
Berlin has recognised German Sign Language in its equality legislation since 1999.

=== Greece ===
Greek Sign Language was recognised as an official language in 2000 and gained equal status with Modern Greek in 2017.

=== Iceland ===
Icelandic Sign Language was recognised by law in education in 2004:

This National Curriculum Guide contains, for the first time, provisions on special Icelandic instruction for students whose mother tongue is not Icelandic. There are also new provisions on special Icelandic instruction for deaf and hearing-impaired pupils and sign-language instruction for the deaf. The objectives for Icelandic instruction of immigrants and the deaf and of sign-language instruction fall under the subject area of language arts (Icelandic) in compulsory school. [...] Sign language is of basic importance for the development of language, personality and thinking of deaf children. For the deaf, sign language is the most important source of knowledge and their route to participation in Icelandic culture and the culture of the deaf. Sign language is of great importance for all school work and for the pupils' life and work.

— The National Curriculum Guide for Compulsory School (Ministry of Education, Science and Culture, 2004) (official translation)

In June 2011, Icelandic Sign Language was officially recognized as a first language. In No. 61/2011 under Article 3 it states that "Icelandic sign language is the first language of those who have to rely on it for expression and communication, and of their children. The government authorities shall nurture and support it. All those who need to use sign language shall have the opportunity to learn and use Icelandic sign language as soon as their language acquisition process begins, or from the time when deafness, hearing impairment or deaf-blindness is diagnosed. Their immediate family members shall have the same right."

=== Indian subcontinent ===
Although Indo-Pakistani Sign Language (IPSL) is officially unrecognised, it is used in India, Bangladesh, and Pakistan.

=== Ireland ===
The Irish Parliament passed the Irish Sign Language Act 2017 passed on 14 December 2017, and was signed into law by President Michael D. Higgins on 24 December of that year, giving Irish Sign Language legal recognition. Before 2017, there was no automatic right for deaf people to have an ISL interpreter except for criminal-court proceedings. ISL recognition provides more legal rights and better access to public services, including education, healthcare, media and banking.

=== Italy ===
Italian Sign Language (Lingua dei Segni Italiana, LIS) was recognised on 19 May 2021. Although opponents of LIS recognition say that it is not a language because it lacks grammar, its grammar has been studied.

=== Japan ===
Japanese Sign Language was recognized as a language by the Basic Act for Persons with Disabilities, which was enacted in 2011.

==== Prefectural ====
In 2013, the first general sign language law was established in Tottori Prefecture. A proposal for a "Japanese Sign Language Act" that started in Hakusan City in Ishikawa Prefecture in 2013, reached unanimous support across the 1788 local legislatures.

=== Kenya ===
The 2010 Constitution of Kenya recognises Kenyan Sign Language and, according to Article 7.3b, says that Kenya would promote its development and use. KSL is given official status in Article 120 (1), which says that "the official languages of Parliament are Kiswahili, English and Kenyan Sign Language and the business of Parliament may be conducted in English, Kiswahili and Kenyan Sign Language."

=== Luxembourg ===
German Sign Language was recognised in 2018 as a language for which children have the right to access education in sign language in both secondary school and primary school, and family members were given the right to access up to 100 hours of sign language courses.

=== Malta ===
Maltese Sign Language (Maltese: Lingwa tas-Sinjali Maltija, or LSM) was officially recognised by the Parliament of Malta in March 2016.

=== Mexico ===
Mexican Sign Language (lengua de señas mexicana, or LSM) was declared a "national language" in 2003, and it began use in public deaf education. Deaf education in Mexico had focused on oralism (speech and lipreading), and few schools conducted classes in LSM.

=== Nepal ===
Although Nepali Sign Language has not been recognised as the official language of Nepal's deaf population, legislation is proposed which will bring Nepali law into line with the UN Convention on the Rights of Persons with Disabilities.

=== Netherlands ===
Roelof van Laar explaining the 2016 bill to recognise NGT

Dutch Sign Language (Dutch: Nederlandse Gebarentaal, or NGT) was recognised by law in 2020. The Christian Union party introduced a bill to recognise NGT in 2010, but it did not pass. In October 2016, MPs Roelof van Laar (Labour Party) and Carla Dik-Faber (Christian Union) proposed a bill legally recognising NGT as an official language. MP Attje Kuiken (Labour Party) took over the bill in September 2019 (after Van Laar's departure), and MP Jessica van Eijs (Democrats 66) joined Kuiken and Dik-Faber. At the end of the month, the Advisory Division of the Council of State said that the text of the bill was still too vague and did not clarify which problems it intended to address and how it would do so; it asked if "the Deaf culture" mentioned in the bill also needed to be legally recognised and, if so, what that term entailed.

=== New Zealand ===
New Zealand Sign Language became the country's third official language, joining English and Māori, when the New Zealand Sign Language Act 2006 was passed in the New Zealand Parliament on 6 April 2006.

=== North Macedonia ===
Macedonian Sign Language (Macedonian: Македонски знаковен јазик, romanized: Makedonski znakoven jazik) is officially recognized as a "natural way of communication between people", and is regulated by a law which allows anyone in North Macedonia to study it. The law also ensures the right to an interpreter upon request.

=== Norway ===
Norwegian Sign Language is recognised by law for education. It is recognized as one of Norway's national languages.

=== Papua New Guinea ===
Papua New Guinean Sign Language became the country's fourth official language in May 2015.

=== Philippines ===
Article 3 of Republic Act No. 11106 declared Filipino Sign Language the country's national sign language, specifying that it be recognized, supported and promoted as the medium of official communication in all transactions involving the deaf and the language of instruction in deaf education.

=== Peru ===
Peru officially recognized Peruvian Sign Language as the country's national sign language by law in 2010.

=== Portugal ===
Art. 74, 2 (h): In implementing the education policy, the state shall be charged with protecting and developing Portuguese sign language, as an expression of culture and an instrument for access to education and equal opportunities.

— Constitution of Portugal

=== Russia ===
Russian Sign Language (Russian: Русский жестовый язык, romanized: Russkii zhestovyi yazyk) has had legal recognition since 2012. Since the federal Law on Protection of People with Disabilities passed and the UN Convention on the Rights of Persons with Disabilities was implemented, services in Russian Sign Language have been greatly expanded. A UN report in 2018 noted that, for example, between 40 and 240 hours of free interpretation are provided to each individual per year in Russia.

=== Slovakia ===
Slovak Sign Language was recognised in 1995 by law.

=== South Africa ===
Until 2023, South African Sign Language (SASL) was not specifically recognised as an official language by the country's constitution. The phrase "sign language" is used generically. On 13 November 2009, the Constitutional Review Committee met to explore the possibility of upgrading SASL to South Africa's 12th official language. In May 2022 the 18th Constitutional Amendment Bill to make SASL an official language was published for public comment. In May 2023 the bill was voted on by parliament, and on 19 July 2023 it was signed into law as the Constitution Eighteenth Amendment Act of 2023.

==== Provincial ====
South African Sign Language is specifically recognised as a language that citizens should be able to access provincial services in 5 provinces through the following legislation:

- Northern Cape Use of Official Languages Act, 2013
- Mpumalanga Provincial Languages Act, 2014
- North West Provincial Languages Act, 2015
- Gauteng Provincial Languages Act, 2016,
- Use of Free State Official Languages Act, 2017

=== South Korea ===
The Korean Sign Language Act (한국수화언어법; 韓國手話言語法; Hanguk Suhwa Eoneo Beop), which was adopted on 3 February 2016 and came into effect on 4 August 2016, established Korean Sign Language as an official language for the Deaf in South Korea equal in status with Korean. The law also stipulates that the national and local governments are required to provide translation services in Korean Sign Language to Deaf individuals who need them. After Korean Sign Language had been established, it became a requirement for there to be signed interpretations in court. KSL is also used during public events and social services programs. South Korea offers sign language courses for hearing. Special sign language instruction courses are available for parents with deaf children.

=== Spain ===
In 2007, the Spanish parliament, the Cortes Generales, passed the Law 27/2007 (23 October 2007) on the recognition of sign languages in the country, including Spanish Sign Language.

==== Catalonia ====
In 2010, the Parliament of Catalonia passed Law 17/2010 on the Catalan Sign Language.

==== Valencia ====
Article 13,4: The Generalitat shall grant the use of the sign language of deaf persons (which shall be used for education) with protection and respect.

— Statute of Autonomy of Valencia

=== Sri Lanka ===
According to a 23 September 2010 report, Sri Lankan Sign Language has been officially recognised.

=== Sweden ===
Sweden was one of the first countries in the world to officially recognize a signed language (Swedish Sign Language) as a language, and this has led to an expansion in availability of courses in school.

=== Switzerland ===
The Swiss Parliament approved a motion for the Government to bring forward legislation to recognise Swiss German Sign Language, French Sign Language and Italian Sign Language.

=== Taiwan ===
Taiwanese Sign Language was first recognised as a national language of Taiwan in 2019 by the National Languages Act in 2019.

=== Thailand ===
Thai Sign Language was recognised as "the national language of deaf people in Thailand" on 17 August 1999 in a resolution signed by the Permanent Secretary for Education on behalf of the Royal Thai Government which affirmed the rights of deaf people to learn the language at home and in schools. According to a 13 October 1999 report by Charles Reilly, "specific actions will be taken by the government, including hiring deaf people as teachers and instructors of sign language in deaf schools, and providing interpreters for deaf people in higher education."

=== Turkey ===
Turkish Sign Language is used by the country's deaf community. On 1 July 2005, the Grand National Assembly of Turkey enacted an updated Disability Law (No. 5378) which referred to sign language. According to Law No. 15, sign language is to be used in deaf education; Law No. 30 stipulates that sign language interpretation be provided to deaf people. There has been discussion in Parliament about developing a standardised sign language.

=== Uganda ===
On 8 October 1995, Uganda adopted a new constitution promoting the development of a sign language for the deaf. Ugandan Sign Language was not specified. Twenty-five-year-old Alex Ndeezi, executive director of the Uganda National Association of the Deaf from 2000 to 2014, was elected to Parliament in 1996.

XXIV (iii). The State shall [...] promote the development of a sign language for the deaf.

— National Objectives and Directive Principles of State Policy, Constitution of Uganda

=== United Kingdom ===
British Sign Language (BSL) achieved non-legislative recognition in 2003 by the UK government

BSL was recognised by the Parliament of the United Kingdom as a language of England, Scotland, and Wales in 2022. On 28 April 2022, the British Sign Language Act 2022 was given royal assent, giving BSL a similar status to Welsh in Wales, Scottish Gaelic in Scotland, and created a duty for the UK government, public bodies and English local authorities to promote the use of BSL, but it did not extend this obligation to devolved matters for Scotland, and Wales.

==== Wales ====
BSL achieved non-legislative recognition in 2004 by the Welsh government.

BSL may be recognised by the Senedd as a language of Wales, with the passage of Mark Isherwood's British Sign Language (Wales) Bill, giving BSL a similar status to Welsh in Wales, and would create a duty for the Welsh government, public bodies to promote the use of BSL.

==== Scotland ====
BSL achieved non-legislative recognition in 2011 by the Scottish government

BSL was recognised by the Scottish Parliament as a language of Scotland in 2015. On 22 October 2015, the British Sign Language (Scotland) Act 2015 was given royal assent, giving BSL a similar status Scottish Gaelic in Scotland, and created a duty for the Scottish government, public bodies and local authorities to promote the use of BSL.

==== Northern Ireland ====
British and Irish Sign Language were given non-legislative recognition by the Northern Ireland Office in 2004. In 2024, the Minister for Communities, "set out proposals to increase the number of interpreters and, ultimately, bring forward a Sign Language Bill". The bill was introduced in February 2025 as the Sign Language Bill. Unlike England, Scotland, Wales, Northern Ireland has two sign languages – BSL and ISL, so the legislation recognises both ISL and BSL.

==== Mayors ====
===== Greater London =====
In 2023, the Mayor of London, Sadiq Khan, signed the British Deaf Association's Charter for British Sign Language "to address discrimination, empower deaf communities and improve relationships between public sector organisations and Deaf communities".

===== Greater Manchester =====
In 2024, as a candidate for Mayor of Greater Manchester, Andy Burnham pledged to require that there is BSL sign on the live stream of all meetings of the Greater Manchester Combined Authority.

=== United States ===
The federal government does not recognize any language, spoken or signed, as an official language. However, several U.S. universities accept American Sign Language credit to meet their foreign-language requirements. In some states, the study of American Sign Language is eligible for foreign language credit at the high school level. In 2015, California became the first US state to legislate language development milestone guidance pertaining to children whose first language is a signed language.

=== Uruguay ===
Although Uruguay has no "official" languages, Uruguayan Sign Language (Spanish: Lengua de señas uruguaya, or LSU), was legally recognised as the language of deaf persons on 10 July 2001.

In the 2008 law 18.437 (Ley General de Educación, 12 December 2008), LSU is considered (with Uruguayan Spanish and Uruguayan Portuguese) a mother tongue of Uruguayan citizens. In policy documents of the Comisión de Políticas Lingüísticas en la Educación Pública (Public Education Language Policy Commission, part of the Administración Nacional de Educación Pública or ANEP), it is proposed that LSU be the principal language of deaf education.

=== Venezuela ===
Venezuelan Sign Language was recognised in the country's constitution on 12 November 1999.

=== Zimbabwe ===
The Zimbabwean sign languages, grouped as "sign language", are recognised in the 2013 Constitution of Zimbabwe as one of the sixteen "officially recognised languages of Zimbabwe".

== Sources ==
- Report on the status of Sign Languages in Europe (PDF link)
- Official Recognition of British Sign Language
