= Languages of Belgium =

- Official: Dutch (1st: ~50%, 2nd: ~13%) French (1st: ~36%, 2nd: ~46%) German (1st: ~1%, 2nd: ~17%)
- Regional: Romance languages: Walloon, Picard, Champenois, Lorrain Germanic Languages: Limburgish, Luxembourgish Dialects of Dutch: West Flemish, East Flemish, Brabantian Dialects of German: Moselle Franconian, Ripuarian
- Foreign: English (2nd: 58%), Spanish (2nd: 9%)
- Signed: Flemish Sign Language (VGT), French Belgian Sign Language (LSFB), German Sign Language (DGS)
- Keyboard layout: Belgian AZERTY
- Source: https://europa.eu/eurobarometer/surveys/detail/2979

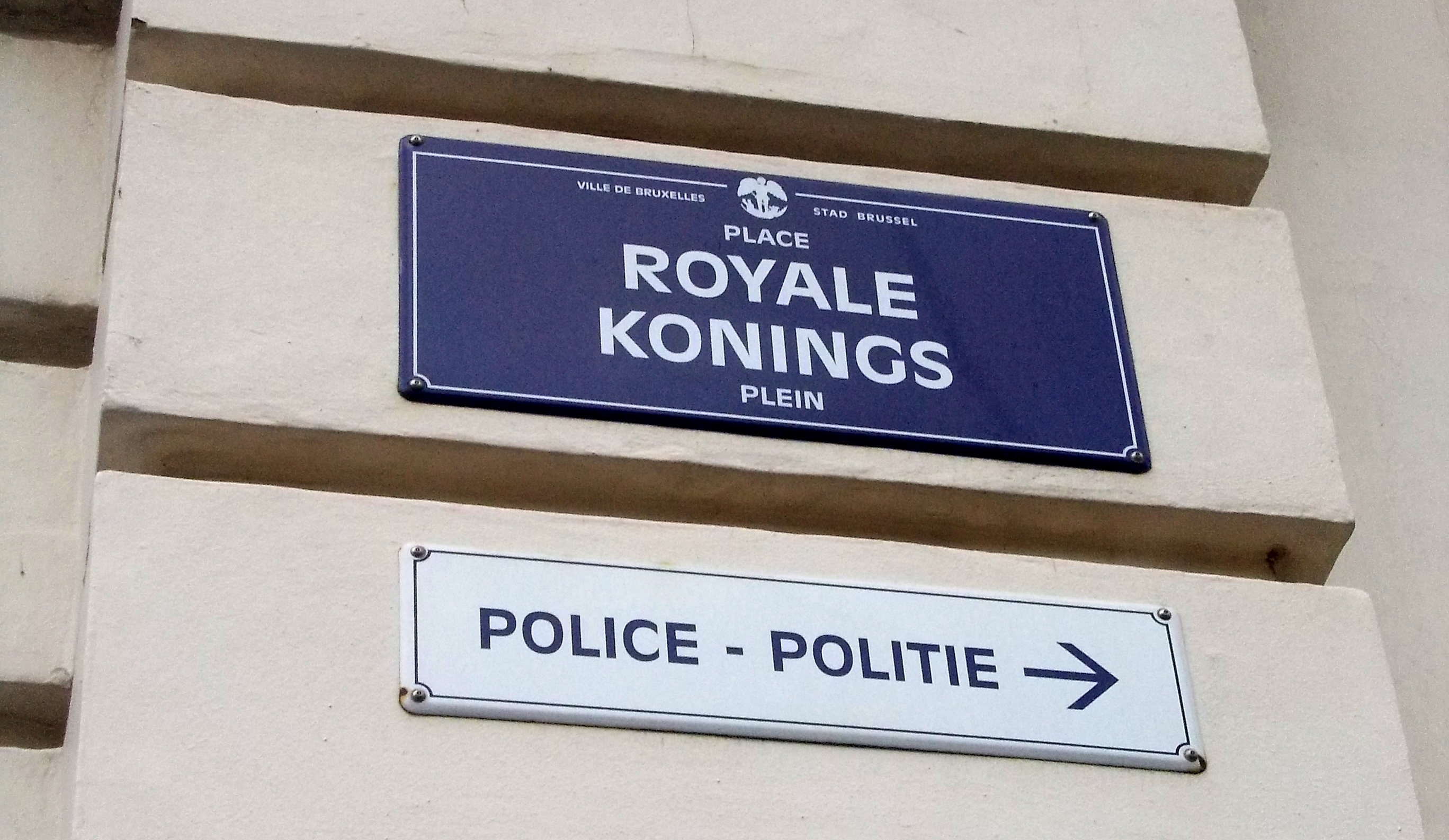
Two bilingual signs (both in French and Dutch) on a street in Brussels

As a result of being in between Latin and Germanic Europe, and historically being split between different principalities, the Kingdom of Belgium has three official languages: Dutch, French, and German. A number of non-official, minority languages and dialects are spoken as well.

== Official languages ==
=== Legal status ===
The Belgian Constitution guarantees, since the country's independence, freedom of language in the private sphere. Article 30 specifies that "the use of languages spoken in Belgium is optional; only the law can rule on this matter, and only for acts of the public authorities and for legal matters."

For those public authorities, there is extensive language legislation concerning Dutch, French and German, even though the Belgian Constitution does not explicitly mention which languages enjoy official status. Article 4 divides the country into linguistic areas, which form the basis of the federal structure: "Belgium has four linguistic areas: The French-speaking region, the Dutch-speaking region, the bilingual region of Brussels Capital, and the German-speaking region."

Before the federal structure and the language legislation were gradually introduced in the later 20th century, French was generally the only language used by public authorities. For example, the Dutch version of the Constitution has enjoyed equal status to the original French one only since 1967, and the German version since 1991.

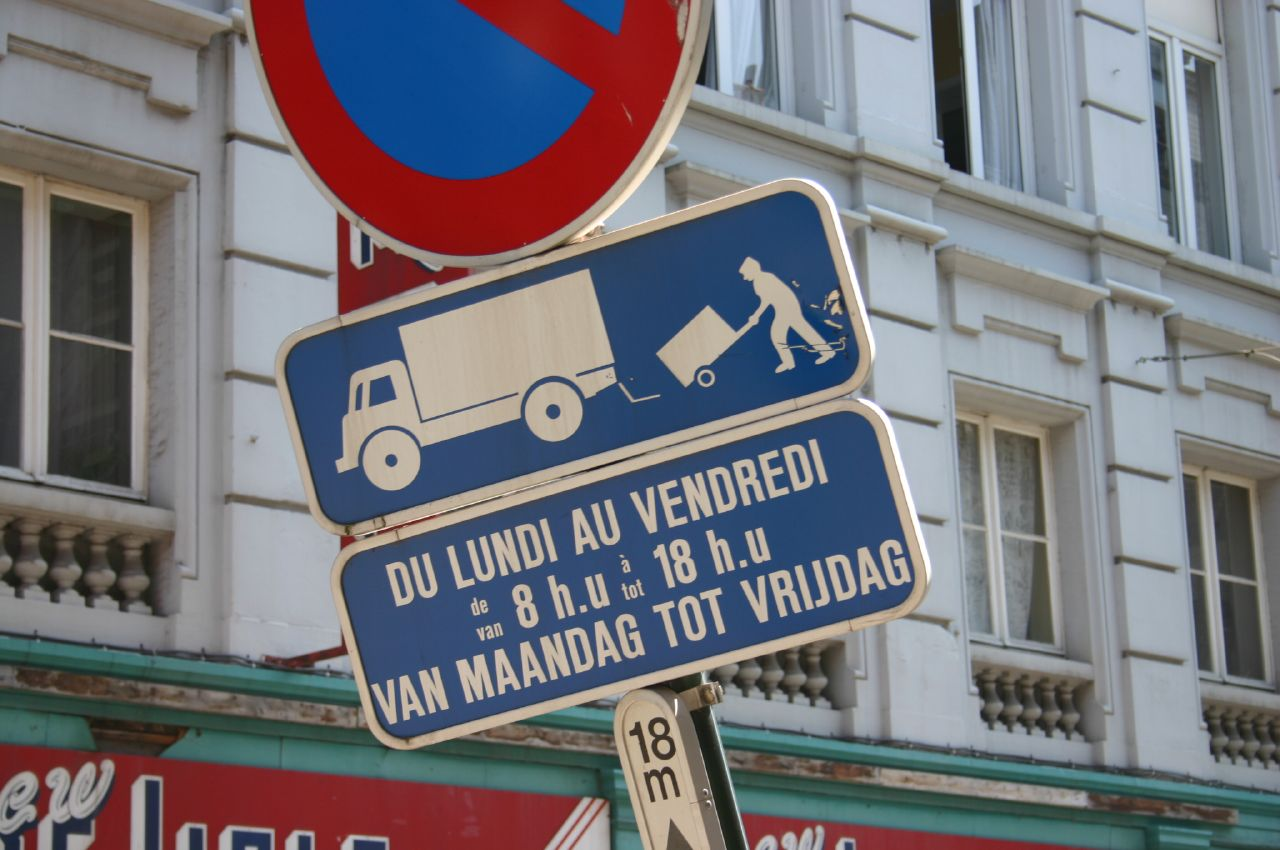
A traffic sign worded in both French and Dutch (as from top to bottom) in Brussels

Of the inhabitants of Belgium, more than half belong to the Flemish Community, 40% to the French Community, and 1% to the German-speaking Community. These figures relating to official Belgian languages overlook substantial numbers of immigrants and their children, who may speak a foreign language as primary language, as well as of Belgian regional migrants, who likely largely balance one another for native French and Dutch speakers.

A large French-speaking population lives around Brussels, in Flanders, though by geography is considered part of the Flemish Community. Though the standard form of Dutch used in Belgium is almost identical to that spoken in the Netherlands, and the different dialects across the border, it is often colloquially called "Flemish".

=== Dutch ===
Dutch is the most spoken primary language of Belgium and the official language of the Flemish Community and the Flemish Region (merged to Flanders). Along with French, it is an official language of the Brussels-Capital Region. The main Dutch dialects spoken in Belgium are Brabantian, West Flemish, East Flemish, and Limburgish. All these are spoken across the border in the Netherlands as well, and West Flemish is also spoken in French Flanders. Much like English, Flemish dialects have adopted more French and other Romance vocabulary through mutual cultural exchange throughout history when compared with other Dutch dialects. As such, they are not always readily intelligible for Dutch speakers outside Flanders. Nevertheless, linguists regard these as varieties of Dutch. Words which are unique to Belgian Dutch are called belgicisms (as are words used primarily in Belgian French). The original Brabantian dialect of Brussels has been very much influenced by French. It is now spoken by a minority in the Capital region, since the primary language of most inhabitants shifted during the Francization of Brussels.

=== French ===
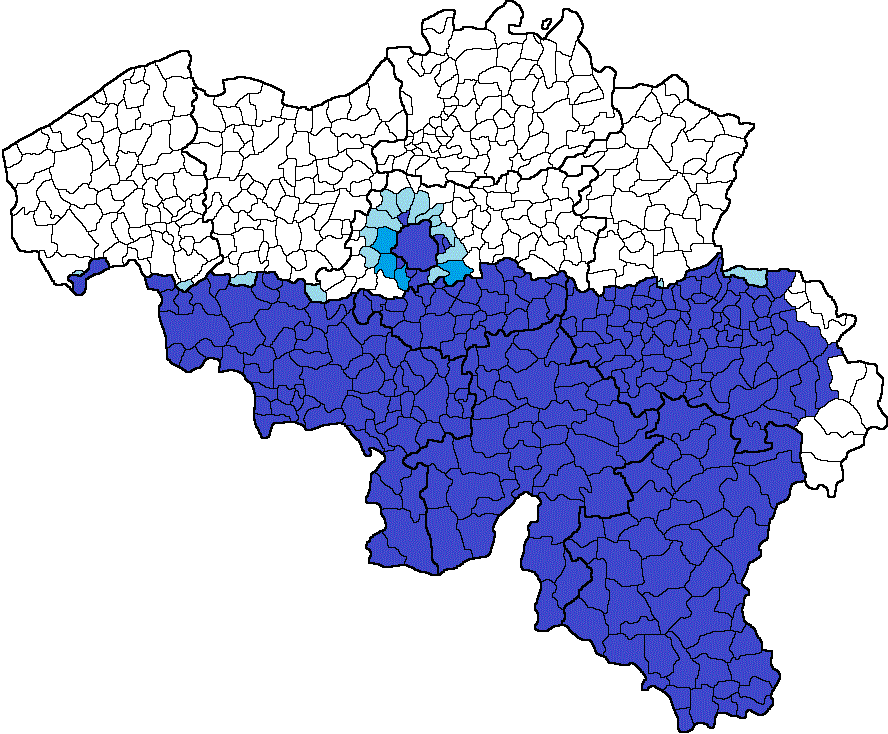
Map of French-speaking Belgium. >50% French speakers 30 to 50% French speakers 10 to 30% French speakers

The second-most spoken primary (Belgian) language, used natively by approximately one third of the population, is French. It is the official language of the French Community (which, like the Flemish Community, is a political entity), the dominant language in Wallonia (having also a small German-speaking Community), as well as the Brussels-Capital Region. Almost all of the inhabitants of the Capital region speak French as either their primary language (50%) or as a lingua franca (45%). Many Flemish people also speak French as a second language. Belgian French is in most respects identical to the French of France, but differs in some points of vocabulary, pronunciation, and semantics.

According to the Organisation internationale de la Francophonie, 76% of Belgians could speak French in 2022.

=== German ===
German is the least prevalent official language in Belgium, spoken natively by less than 1% of the population. The German-speaking Community of Belgium numbers 79,500, residing in an area of Belgium that was ceded by the former German Empire as part of the Treaty of Versailles, which concluded World War I. In 1940, Nazi Germany re-annexed the region, following its invasion of Belgium during World War II; after the war it was returned to Belgium.

== Use ==
Distribution of languages of Belgium
Dutch	59%
French	40%
German	1%

In national politics, politicians can freely choose to speak in any of the three official languages. In turn, the Belgian parliament provides simultaneous interpretation for those who require it to assist in communication.

Education is provided by the Communities, Dutch in the Flemish Community (Flanders and Brussels), French in the French Community (Wallonia and Brussels), German in the German-speaking community. Instruction in other languages is prohibited in government-funded schools except for foreign language subjects. However, the English language has become increasingly used in higher education.

Also all official correspondence and communication with the government (e.g. tax papers, local politics, ID/passport requests, building permits etc.) must be in the official language of the region or community. Inhabitants of a few municipalities are granted an exception to these rules.

== Multilingualism ==
In 2006, the Université catholique de Louvain, the country's largest French-speaking university, published a report with the introduction (translated):

This issue regarding economies is devoted to the demand for knowledge of languages in Belgium and in its three regions (Brussels, Flanders, Wallonia). The surveys show that Flanders is clearly more multilingual, which is without doubt a well-known fact, but the difference is considerable: whereas 59% and 53% of the Flemings know French or English respectively, only 19% and 17% of the Walloons know Dutch or English. The measures advocated by the Marshall Plan are heading towards the proper direction, but are doubtlessly quite insufficient to fully overcome the lag. [This particular 2006–2009 'Marshall Plan' was devised in 2004 and published in 2005 to uplift the Walloon economy.]

Within the report, professors in economics Ginsburgh and Weber further show that of Brussels' residents, 95% declared they can speak French, 59% Dutch, and 41% know the non-local English. Of those under the age of forty, 59% in Flanders declared that they could speak all three, along with 10% in Wallonia and 28% in Brussels. In each region, Belgium's third official language, German, is notably less known than those.

== Non-official languages ==
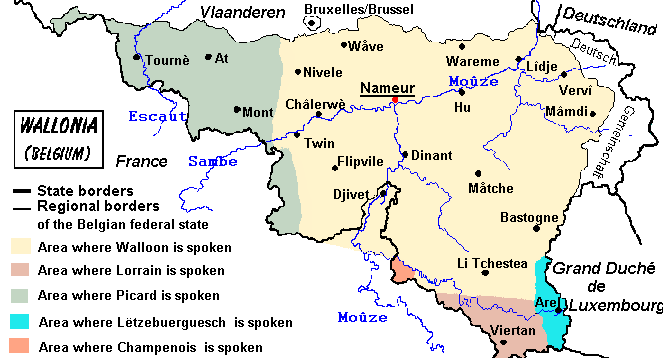
A linguistic map of the original languages in Wallonia, now largely replaced by standard Belgian French

In addition to the three official languages, others are spoken in Belgium, for instance in Wallonia, where French became dominant only relatively recently. Sometimes seen as dialects, the varieties related to French have been recognized by the French Community as separate languages (langues régionales endogènes, lit. 'regional native languages') since 1990. But there have been no significant measures to support usage of those varieties.

=== Romance ===
==== Walloon ====
Walloon is the historical language of southern Belgium, and most of the areas where French is now spoken were Walloon-speaking. It is also the traditional national language of the Walloons. Though it has been recognized since 1990, like other vernaculars in Belgium, it is spoken mainly by older people. Some younger Walloons may claim some knowledge. It is used mainly in rural regions, where change comes more slowly. It is also used in theatre productions and other forms of literature, though not in schools.

==== Picard ====
Another language related to French, and also a historic language of the region, Picard was recognized in 1990 by the government of the French Community. Picard has been historically based in France, with speakers also in the western part of Wallonia.

==== Champenois ====
Champenois was also legally recognized in 1990. It is mainly spoken in Champagne, France, and a small part of Wallonia.

==== Lorrain ====
Like the other indigenous languages closely related to French, Lorrain was recognized in 1990. It is mainly spoken in Gaume, a part of Belgian Lorraine.

=== Germanic ===
==== Dutch ====
Flanders too has a number of dialects, but linguists regard these as varieties of Dutch rather than a separate Flemish language, with the exception of Limburgish and West Flemish. The main Dutch dialects in Belgium are Brabantian and East Flemish. Standard Dutch, as spoken in Belgium, is mostly influenced by Brabantian. There are literary traditions in both the East Flemish and West Flemish dialects.

==== Limburgish ====
Limburgish is a language which is spoken in Limburg province.

==== Luxembourgish ====
Since 1990 this language has been recognised by the Walloon authorities as Francique (Franconian). It was the only non-Romance language recognized in the 1990 decree.

==== Marols ====
Marols, also known as Brusseleir, is a nearly extinct dialect spoken in Brussels, and used primarily in informal contexts. It is mostly a mixture of French and Dutch influences. Marols originated from the Brabantian dialect and gained greater French influences after the Kingdom of Belgium was established in 1830 following the Belgian Revolution. The dialect was named after the Marollen, a neighborhood in Brussels.

==== Yiddish ====
Yiddish is spoken by many among the 18,000 Jews living in Antwerp, where there is a considerable number of orthodox Jews who "maintain a largely traditional Jewish way of life...[in which] Yiddish is widely spoken even outside the homes and also by Jews who were born in Belgium."

=== Sign languages ===
==== LSFB ====
LSFB, or French Belgian Sign Language, is used primarily in Wallonia and Brussels and is related to LSF and other Francosign languages. It developed from Old Belgian Sign Language, which developed as a result of contact between Lyons Sign Language and LSF.

==== VGT ====
Like LSFB, Flemish Sign Language, or VGT, is a Francosign language descended from Old Belgian Sign Language. It is used primarily in Flanders, with five major regional dialects: West Flanders, East Flanders, Antwerp, Flemish Brabant, and Limburg. There is dialectal variation between men and women speakers due to historical developments of the language.

==== DGS ====
Unlike VGT and LSFB, DGS, or German Sign Language, is unrelated to LSF and comprises its own language family. DGS is related to PJM and Shassi. It is used primarily around the German-speaking communities of Belgium, although German and DGS are unrelated.

=== Indo-Aryan ===
Sinte Romani is spoken by many among the 10,000 Romani or Sinti living in Belgium. It has significant German influence and is not mutually intelligible with other Romani languages. The language belongs to the Northwestern Romani dialect group. The language and people are often called "Gypsies" by outsiders, a term considered to be pejorative due to its connotations of illegality and irregularity.

=== Main foreign languages ===
Since the late 20th century, Belgium has received immigrants from different areas of Europe, the Mediterranean, and North Africa. They and their descendants speak languages including Berber (Riffian), Arabic (Maghrebi), Spanish, Turkish, Portuguese, Italian, Greek, Polish, and English.

== See also ==
- Language legislation in Belgium
