= French Sign Language family =

Sign language family derived from Old French Sign Language

French Sign Language
- Francosign
- Geographic distribution: Before 1850, Western Europe, and North America; today parts of Europe, the Americas, Africa, and Asia.
- Linguistic classification: One of the world's primary language families
- Early form: Old French Sign Language

Language codes
- Glottolog: lsfi1234

The French Sign Language (LSF, from langue des signes française), or Francosign, family is a language family of sign languages which includes French Sign Language and American Sign Language.

The LSF family descends from Old French Sign Language (VLSF), which developed among the deaf community in Paris. The earliest mention of Old French Sign Language is by the abbé Charles-Michel de l'Épée in the late 18th century, but it could have existed for centuries prior. Several European sign languages, such as Russian Sign Language, derive from it, as does American Sign Language, established when French educator Laurent Clerc taught his language at the American School for the Deaf. Others, such as Spanish Sign Language, are thought to be related to French Sign Language even if they are not directly descended from it.

== Language family tree ==
=== Anderson (1979) ===
Anderson (1979) postulated the following classification of LSF and its relatives, with derivation from Medieval monks' sign systems, though some lineages are apparently traced by their manual alphabets and thus irrelevant for actual classification:

- LSF
  - Monastic sign languages (described 1086)
  - "Southwest European" Sign Languages
    - Proto-Spanish
      - Spanish Sign Language (dictionary 1851)
      - Venezuelan Sign Language
      - Irish
        - Australian Catholic
    - Old Polish
      - Polish Sign Language
    - Old French Sign Language (VLSF, before l'Épée)
      - Eastern French: Old Danish (edu. 1807), Old German, German Evangelical (edu. 1779 Austria), Old Russian (edu. 1806)
      - Western French
        - Middle French Sign Language finger-spelling group: Netherlands (1780), Belgium (1793), Switzerland, Old French
        - Middle French (dict. 1850)
          - French
        - American (edu. 1816; later including components from Northwest European sign languages)
        - International finger-spelling group: Norway, Finland, Germany, US
        - Old Brazilian
          - Brazil, Argentina, Mexico

=== Wittmann (1991) and later research ===
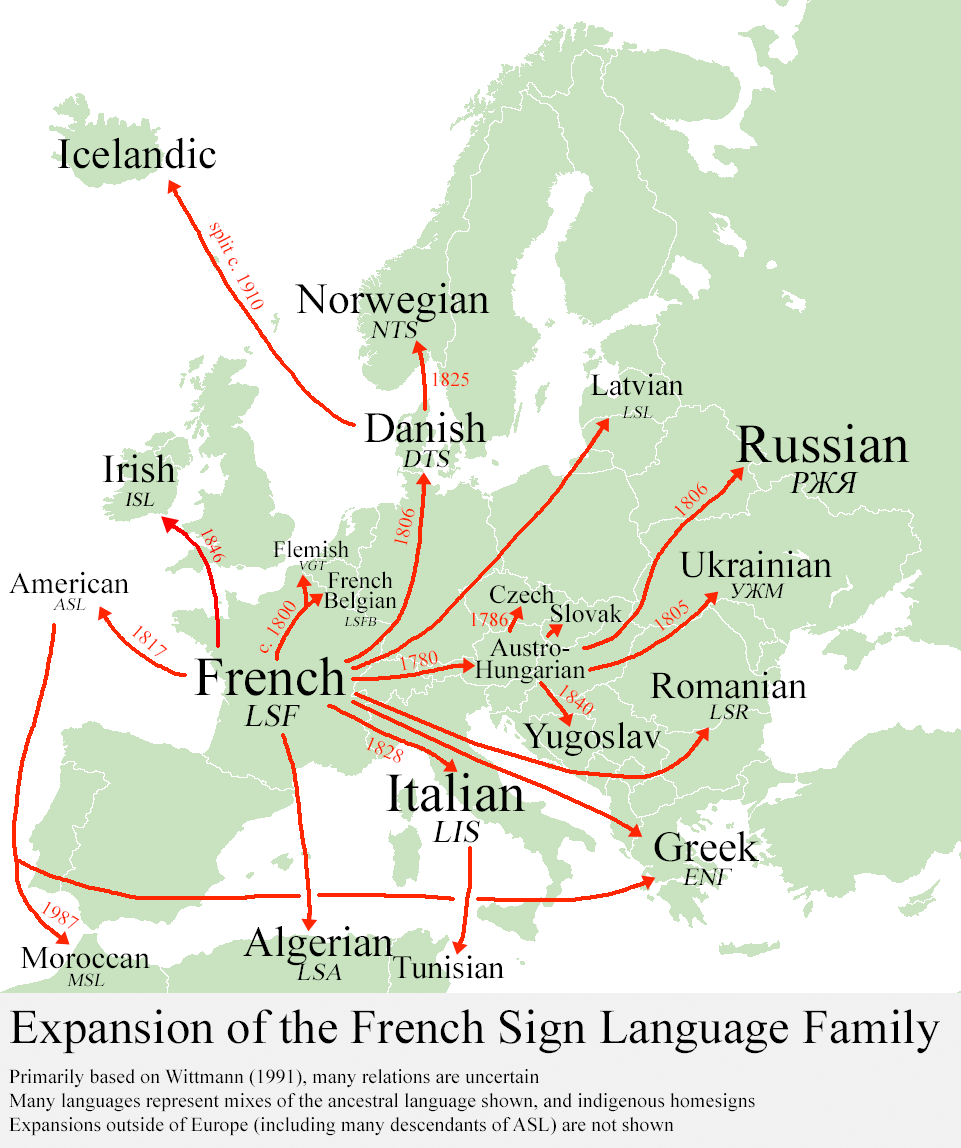
Map of languages in the French Sign Language family, in Europe and the Maghreb

Henri Wittmann (1991) has been influential in scholarly attempts at constructing the French Sign Language family tree. He listed most of the following suspected members of the family, with date of establishment or earliest attestation. Subsequent scholarly research has confirmed most of his conclusions, but rejected others and expanded the family tree with new branches, while removing others.

- French Sign Language (1752; may be different from Old French Sign Language)
  - Austro-Hungarian Sign Language (1780; now seen as separate Austrian Sign Language and Hungarian Sign Language)
    - Czech Sign Language (1786)
    - Ukrainian Sign Language (1805)
    - Russian Sign Language (1806)
      - Bulgarian Sign Language (1920)
      - probably Estonian Sign Language (1866)
    - Slovak Sign Language
    - Slovenian Sign Language (1840)
    - Croatian Sign Language (1885)
    - possibly Israeli Sign Language (1934) (but German Sign Language may be a stronger possibility)
  - Belgian Sign Language (c. 1800 – c. 2000), split during the federalisation of Belgium
    - Flemish Sign Language (c. 1970 – present)
    - French Belgian Sign Language (c. 1970 – present)
  - Dutch Sign Language (1799)
  - Danish Sign Language (1806)
    - Norwegian Sign Language (1825)
      - Malagasy Sign Language (1950)
    - Icelandic Sign Language (split c. 1910)
    - Faroese Sign Language (1960)
  - Latvian Sign Language (1806)
  - Philippine Sign Language (1806?) (frequently attributed to American Sign Language)
  - American Sign Language (1817, with possible local admixture)
    - Puerto Rican Sign Language (1907)
    - Thai Sign Language (1951, creolized with indigenous sign).
    - Ghanaian Sign Language (1957)
    - Nigerian Sign Language (1960)
    - Kuala Lumpur Sign Language (1960?; now Malaysian Sign Language?)
    - Bolivian Sign Language (1973; a dialect of American Sign Language)
    - Moroccan Sign Language (1987?)
    - Black American Sign Language
    - and "Eskimo Sign Language"? (dubious: the indigenous Inuit Sign Language is an isolate)
  - A mixture of LSF and ASL may have given rise to
    - Quebec Sign Language (1817)
    - Greek Sign Language (with local admixture)
  - Italian Sign Language (1828)
    - Tunisian Sign Language (with local admixture)
  - Irish Sign Language (1846)
  - Mexican Sign Language (1869)
  - Algerian Sign Language (undated)
  - Romanian Sign Language (undated)
  - ? Catalan Sign Language (undated, but early)

Post-1991 modifications

Wittnann believed Lyons Sign Language, Spanish Sign Language, Brazilian Sign Language, and Venezuelan Sign Language, which are sometimes counted in the French family, had separate origins, though with some contact through stimulus diffusion, and it was Lyons rather than French Sign Language that gave rise to Belgian Sign Language. Chilean Sign Language (1852) has also been included in the French family but is not listed by Wittmann. Hawaiian Pidgin Sign Language (with possible local admixture) turned out to be an isolate, unrelated to French, American, or any other Sign Language. J. Albert Bickford concluded that there was 'no substantive evidence that the [Lyons Sign Language] ever existed' and retired it from Ethnologue in 2017.

French Sign Language family tree

Old French Sign Language (influenced by l'Epée c. 1760–1789)
French Sign Language (c. 1790–present)	Belgian Sign Language (c. 1790–2000)	Dutch Sign Language (c. 1790–present)	Austro-Hungarian Sign Language (c. 1780–1920)
American Sign Language (c. 1820–present)	French Belgian Sign Language (c. 1970–present)	Flemish Sign Language (c. 1970–present)	Italian Sign Language (c. 1830–present)
Austrian Sign Language (c. 1800–present)	Slovak Sign Language	Czech Sign Language (c. 1786–present)	Hungarian Sign Language	Ukrainian Sign Language (c. 1805–present)	Russian Sign Language (c. 1806–present)	Yugoslav Sign Language (c. 1840–present)
Bhutanese Sign Language	Black American Sign Language	Bolivian Sign Language	Costa Rican Sign Language	Jamaican Sign Language	Puerto Rican Sign Language	Dominican Sign Language

== See also ==
- BANZSL
