= French Sign Language Academy =

Academy in Paris, France

- Académie de la langue des signes française
- Formation: June 20, 1979; 47 years ago
- Founder: Guy Bouchauveau, Christian Bourgeois
- Founded at: Paris
- Website: www.languedessignes.fr

The French Sign Language Academy (French: Académie de la langue des signes française), abbreviated ALSF, is a French association to promote French Sign Language (FSL). It was founded in 1979 by Guy Bouchauveau and Christian Bourgeois, the first president. It offers training in FSL and participates in research of the language in partnership with the International Visual Theater. The ALSF is an accredited training center for the Diplôme de Compétences en Langues (Diploma of Language Competence).

== The Hands of Gold Award ==
In 1999, the association created The Hands of Gold Award (Prix des Mains d'Or), awarded to individuals or associations who have done outstanding work to protect or promote the Deaf community.
