= Lingueo =

French education company

- Website type: Virtual education
- Available in: English, Spanish, French, German, Italian, Russian, Portuguese, Romanian, Swedish
- Owner: Lingueo
- Creators: Guillaume le Dieu de Ville, Arnaud Portanelli
- Website: www.lingueo.com
- Registration: Required

Lingueo is a French company in the language education field that aims to help people learn languages through practice with trainers who teach their native language.

== Name ==
Lingueo is a portmanteau of the Latin word "lingua", which means "tongue" (and, by extension, "language"), and the word "video", which refers to language learning by videoconference.

== History ==
Created in 2007, Lingueo is a French enterprise situated in Paris and founded by Guillaume le Dieu de Ville and Arnaud Portanelli.

== Service ==
Lingueo language training organization is certified by Qualiopi and OPQF. More than 15 languages are offered by this company and all courses are certified and eligible for financial aid for training. The company counts among its clients the largest French companies as well as innovative international start-ups. The courses are held directly on the website through videoconferences, and no software to install whatsoever. Lingueo offers a possibility to learn the most commonly spoken languages, and promotes the learning of regional languages as well as French Sign Language. In addition to linguistic learning, Lingueo promotes diversity and cultural exchange. More than 20 different languages are taught on Lingueo by almost 1000 tutors around the world. This effort has been recognized by the European Commission, who rewarded Lingueo in the spring of 2009 with the European Language Label, which is a prize awarded to the most innovative language learning projects.
