= Deafness in Venezuela =

Deafness in Venezuela reflects on both the opportunities and the hardships prevalent for DHH (Deaf and Hard of Hearing) individuals residing in Venezuela. It recognizes Venezuela's official sign language, the availability of hearing screenings, the availability of intervention technologies, the legal state DHH people face, and the recent changes to Venezuelan primary education for DHH students.

Map of Venezuela in South America

== Sign language ==
The official sign language of Venezuela is LSV (Language de Señas Venezolana) or in English, VSL (Venezuelan Sign Language). This is a deaf community sign language with an EGIDS language scale level of 6a, meaning its usage is rated as vigorous. VSL has been taught in schools dating back to 1937, where it was derived from Spanish Sign Language due to the early prominence of Spanish Sign Language teachers before it became a legally recognized language of Venezuela since 1999. There are approximately 86,000 Venezuelan signers in the nation.

== Newborn hearing screening ==
There are no written laws requiring neonatal hearing screening in Venezuela, so none are required to be put into practice. Eight newborn hearing screening sectors are established, seven of them are funded privately while only one receives mixed funding. The funding for these screening programs is there, however the nation lacks formally established backing. Financial disruptions remain the greatest barrier for Latin America as a whole to ratify neonatal hearing screenings. In the limited screenings available, it was proven that 3.5% of all Latin American school-aged individuals were found to have at least one of three different disabilities (vision loss, hearing loss, intellectual delays), and these conditions appeared more consistently in males. Though these screenings are limitedly available, those who are tested are not looked at within their first month of life, which is the universal CDC recommendation for newborns.

Hearing screenings themselves are not mandatory practice in Venezuela, but beginning in 1999 they did begin to roll out nationwide public newborn screening for 2 different disorders instead: CHT (congenital hypothyroidism) and PKU (phenylketonuria).

== Early intervention ==
Due to Venezuela's financial situation, although it is written in rule that DHH individuals are to be provided with signing interpreters if verbal communication is unavailable in Article 41 in the Venezuela Bolivarian Republic Constitution, there are a lack of interpreters for those who rely on LSV. This creates communication barriers for deaf civilians needing access to medical or legal resources.

Similarly to the lack of availability of signing interpreters in Venezuela, the availability regarding access to hearing aids is also something written into law but not as often implemented. Only 10-20% of DHH individuals who could benefit from hearing aids have been able to achieve access to getting them.

For those with better financial standing who have lower hearing levels, cochlear implants are another option offered in Venezuela. Implantations are not required by law, as there are other options for DHH persons. Surgery costs for cochlear implantations average around $262,000 American dollars. Within South American, Venezuela has the lowest percentage of implantation failure, that being at 8%.

== Human & civil rights ==
The World Federation of the Deaf (WFD) raised major concerns with the Venezuelan government in 1997 regarding the availability of translations, subtitles, and sign language interpreting for both spoken and written media. Although the Venezuelan government opted not to respond in writing to the WFD, The Bolivarian Republic of Venezuela Constitution, which was ratified 2 years later, covered their concerns in Article 101. DHH individuals and LSV in Venezuela are now nationally given equal opportunity from under Article 81 of the Bolivarian Republic of Venezuela Constitution in 1999. Article 101 .

== Primary/secondary education ==
Within Latin America, Venezuela was one of the first to globally recognize in 1985 that DHH people are in need of education and access to both written and signed languages. They have had schools for deaf education who focus on teaching LSV since 1937, yet they were not expanded on until 1985. The change in 1985 to have Venezuelan teachers also educate on LSV was so sudden that the educators had no time to prepare curriculums or even educate themselves first. Deaf education including LSV is written to be funded directly from the government in Article 81 of Venezuela's Bolivarian Republic Constitution.

In 1985, the capital of Venezuela, Caracas, was home to 804 DHH students who had access to inclusive specialized programs for learning. Survey results were split 51% male and 49% female students. Most of the students in this study were under the age of 14 as per Venezuela schools' graduation age and only half were 10 years of age or younger. Venezuela currently demonstrates 9 years of deaf education for a student in school-aged years. In each deaf education classroom, it is estimated that there are about 15 students per teacher.

LeSeVen is an educational application developed by linguistic researchers made for school-aged DHH individuals in Venezuela, initially proposed in 2018 at the 18th Annual Latin American Conference on Learning Technologies. The goal with their app is to provide DHH people with the ability to gain knowledge of written Venezuelan vocabulary through LSV. In schools, it is used to provide teachers with detailed statistics on the student's understanding of the language to further their language development.
