= Belgian Sign Language =

Belgian Sign Language may refer to two closely-related sign languages:

- Flemish Sign Language
- French Belgian Sign Language
