= Greek Sign Language =

Sign language of the Greek deaf community

- Ελληνική νοηματική γλώσσα
- Native to: Greece; Cyprus
- Native speakers: Estimates run from 6,000 to 60,000 (2014); Differences may reflect degree of fluency.
- Language family: French Sign: LSF–ASL mix; Greek Sign Language

Language codes
- ISO 639-3: gss
- Glottolog: gree1271

Greek Sign Language (Greek: Ελληνική νοηματική γλώσσα, romanized: Ellinikí noimatikí glóssa, ENG) is a sign language used by the Greek deaf community.

Greek Sign has been legally recognized as the official language area of the Deaf community for educational purposes in Greece since 2000.

On December 19, 2013, the OMKE (Greek Federation of the Deaf) presented the Declaration on the Constitutional Recognition of the Greek Sign Language.

== Historical evolution ==
The language developed from American Sign Language, French Sign Language, and older local sign languages in Greece in the 1950s, as Greece was in the process of urbanization and many deaf people moved to tows.

The Greek Sign Language is recognized as the first language of deaf and hard of hearing students by law 2817/2000. Since 2000, according to the aforementioned law, as well as 3699/2008, knowledge of the Greek Sign Language is a mandatory qualification for the recruitment of new professionals in the education of deaf students. By Law 4488/2017 (Article 65 (2)). The Greek Sign Language is recognized as equal to the Greek language. In addition, the law stipulates that the state is taking measures to promote it and to cover all the communication needs of the deaf and hard of hearing citizens.

== Use of language ==
The Greek Sign Language is not international. Each country develops its own sign language with fundamentally different meanings and a different alphabet. There are both common features and differences at a morphological level. Nevertheless, the Deaf of different states can communicate comfortably through the International Sign, which is essentially a code that serves the simple daily communication needs. As is the case with the spoken languages, dialects exist in each country.

Although there is no official data, users of the Greek Sign Language in Greece are estimated at 40,600, with a rapid upward trend due to interest in learning the language by hearing people. The increase in its distribution is due to its official policy, as well as the broadcasting of news and meetings of the Greek Parliament by Greek television by interpreters.

The educational material that exists in the Greek Sign Language is limited. Since 2010 there has been a steady increase in the production of accessible educational material in electronic and printed form for deaf students.

== Bibliography ==
- Curbetis B., Markakis, E. & Steinhauer, G. (1999). The Greek Sign Language and its Teaching in Deaf Schools. Pedagogical Institute, Athens.
- Lampropoulou, V. (2007). "Η έρευνα της ελληνικής νοηματικής – Παρατηρήσεις φωνολογικής ανάλυσης" ("The research on Greek Sign Language: Observations of phonological analysis"). In Greek. pdf.
- Kourbetis V., & Hatzopoulou M. (2010). I Can Also With My Eyes: Educational Approaches and Practices for Deaf Students . Kastaniotis, Athens
