= Deafness in France =

History, culture, and education of deaf and hard-of-hearing people in France

Deafness in France covers the experiences, education, and community of deaf and hard of hearing (DHH) people in France. The history of deaf and hard of hearing (DHH) people in France is long. As of 2014, there were about 10,000,000 (10 million) hearing impaired people in France (16.1% of the population), of whom about 360,000 (0.6% of the population) had "very serious or total" functional limitations, meaning they were unable to hear a conversation with multiple people and who identified as deaf or hard of hearing. While French Sign Language (LSF) is the main sign language in France, American Sign Language (ASL) is also used and studied. French Cued Speech, a mixture of spoken French and LSF, is also not uncommon.

== Culture ==
DHH individuals in France sometimes take steps in early and mid-life to integrate themselves into hearing society. One of the most common steps is using cochlear implants, devices affixed to ear structures that transmit sounds to the auditory nerve. This allows certain types of hearing loss to be bypassed. Many children born in France are screened for deafness within a week of birth, and when deafness is found, many doctors immediately recommend a cochlear implant for the child. This is controversial, with many parents believing it is too early to apply the procedure. France is recognized for identifying DHH children earlier than most other countries, and many people say that cochlear implantation is undertaken too early, potentially alienating DHH children. Speech therapy, which some associate with alienation, is also commonplace. In speech therapy, DHH people are trained to speak. This gives a sense of abnormality to many involved, but it is carried out because it eases functioning for many DHH individuals outside DHH communities and in predominantly non-signing communities.

Communities and structures exist to prevent DHH individuals from being alienated and to celebrate them. Small, informal communities of DHH individuals are common; in these relatively close-knit circles, cochlear implants, speech therapy, and other methods of conforming are unnecessary. Associations exist to represent the needs of and celebrate DHH individuals. Examples include performances and classes at the IVT theater; the political advocacy of FNSF for DHH people; and the bi-yearly Festival Clin d'Oeil. This festival celebrates arts, parties, movies, and conversation, entirely signed and geared toward DHH individuals. These structures help form communities around deafness, and many individuals shy away from the societally enforced conformist practices in favor of this independent community and their various subsets across the DHH spectrum.

== Education ==
Since 1989, French law has standardized second-language education during primary school; however, unlike in some other countries, it prohibits DHH students’ primary or secondary language from being a sign language. This presents major obstacles. A 2005 law, designed as an equal rights policy, integrated DHH students into mainstream schools, removing much of the support they previously had. As a result, many DHH students attend schools with staff not trained or funded to effectively teach them. These students tend to fall behind. 99.6% of DHH students take English as their first foreign language; the majority who take a second foreign language choose French Sign Language, as this is the earliest opportunity to study their native language. DHH students therefore must generally take two foreign language courses before their native LSF. Many withdraw from their second languages and put themselves behind academically in order to master French; this strategy was popularized by a 2003 study by Ivani Fuselier‐Souza. Some schools teach French cued speech, or "signed French"—a mixture of LSF and spoken French—to mixed classes of hearing and DHH students, but the use of this technique is limited by low levels of training and funding.

While some schools are geared toward DHH students specifically, not all DHH children have access to them, so many language-deficient DHH individuals go through their education without tools to succeed. One 2020 study on spelling errors made by DHH French students showed that while the number of spelling errors did not vary much, the severity of each spelling error ran deeper due to fundamental misunderstandings of the language and, as a result, was significantly harder to understand.

== History ==
In 1755, a French priest, Abbe Charles-Michel de L'Épée, opened a school for the deaf using his own funds. This school produced LSF, which is generally considered the first complete sign language directly traceable to a modern sign language.

Around this time, with the advent of French Sign Language, caretakers of DHH people shifted from being primarily educators to being doctors. Due to new forms of communication, many diseases and injuries became quicker and easier to diagnose. The amount of care DHH people receive from doctors and educators is now greater. However, there are issues with the rate of identification of deadly diseases and infections, particularly cancer, for DHH people; in that case, the average stage of identification is roughly a full stage later than typical identification.

=== World War II ===
A particularly tense time in deaf history was during World War II, during which many deaf people were killed as part of population culling under Nazi orders. France was a place where this was practiced, and while no specific numbers are available, the effects were not insignificant.

There were conflicts in France itself, where many deaf people applied to work in factories to aid the war effort but were turned away unlawfully. In the wake of this, letters were written and published in popular newspapers such as the Gazette, and policies that made it illegal to turn away deaf workers were put into place. However, these policies affected only French deaf males due to other policies in place.

In 1942, the French Prime Minister Pierre Laval conducted a worker-prisoner exchange with Germany. For every three French workers he sent to Germany, a prisoner of war would be freed and released back to France. Deaf workers were primarily sent, and many ended up becoming prisoners of war themselves, mainly those who could not quickly learn to interpret spoken German; these were the majority.

Perhaps as a result of the active ways that DHH individuals made themselves prominent and heard in wartime France, more deaf characters appeared in French media, leading to a flourishing of deaf arts and a fight for individuality.

== Organizations ==
=== FNSF ===
The FNSF (Fédération Nationale des Sourds de France, National Federation of Deafness in France) is a federation involved in 89 different organizations, comprising a wide array of topics in which the views of the DHH community are underrepresented. This federation seeks to ensure that the rights and views of DHH individuals in France are more fully considered and helps oversee some legal processes. As of 2021, this federation was involved in meetings with the Ministries of National Education and Social Affairs, the National Consultative Committee for People with Disabilities, the High Authority of Health, the National Institute of Prevention for Education and Health, the National Monuments Center, and the Superior Audiovisual Council, among others. The predominant values of the federation are culture, unity, participation, self-representation, consistency, patrimony, and solidarity. These values are upheld in its decisions. They are the values placed at the center of education in the camps that it hosts across Europe to facilitate the education of LSF for underprivileged DHH children. It is a member of the European Union of the Deaf and the World Federation of the Deaf.

=== IVT ===
IVT (International Visual Theater) is based in Paris, where it has been stationed since 1981. The organization is run by Emmanuelle Laborit and Jennifer Lesage-David, who use the theater as an educational and community-building center for individuals in the DHH community. Many attend the theater to take classes, participate in performances, and be in a setting where LSF is the standard. Dozens of shows run annually, and hundreds attend classes over the same period. Classes on language, culture, various arts, and more are held within the building and online, as the theater contributes as broadly as it can to the educational facilitation of DHH people in France.

=== DEAFI ===
DEAFI, founded in 2009, is a French communication organization that helps the deaf community by improving communication. To broaden education and communication, the company specializes in communication and connections and is known for webcams that aid in the remote use of LSF. The company assists in online communication, especially during the COVID-19 outbreak. Its overall goal is to give clients the tools to become independent. The company further specializes in connecting its clients with specialized education and job opportunities to facilitate future independence.
