= Brazilian Sign Language =

Sign language of Brazil

- Libras
- Native to: Brazil and Brazilian diaspora
- Region: Urban areas
- Signers: 630,000 (2021)
- Language family: Language isolate?

Language codes
- ISO 639-3: bzs
- Glottolog: braz1236
- ELP: Língua Brasileira de Sinais

Brazilian Sign Language (Portuguese: Língua Brasileira de Sinais [ˈlĩɡwɐ bɾaziˈlejɾɐ dʒi siˈnajs]) is the sign language used by deaf communities of Brazil. It is also known in short as Libras (pronounced [ˈlibɾɐs]) and variously abbreviated as LSB, LGB or LSCB (Língua de Sinais das Cidades Brasileiras; "Brazilian Cities Sign Language").

== Recognition and status ==
Brazilian Sign Language is well-established; several dictionaries, instructional videos and a number of articles on the linguistic features of the language have been published. It has dialects across Brazil reflecting regional and sociocultural differences.

A strong sign language law was passed by the National Congress of Brazil on April 24, 2002, and (in 2005) is in the process of being implemented. The law mandates the use of Brazilian Sign Language in education and government services.

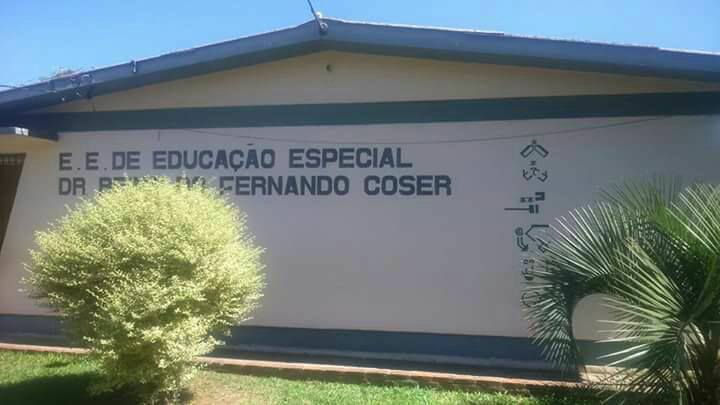
Signwriting used on outside of school for deaf in Santa Maria, Rio Grande do Sul

Educational approaches have evolved from oralism to Total Communication and bilingualism.

In addition to being recognized nationally since 2002, Libras has also been made official at the municipal level in Belo Horizonte, Curitiba, Ouro Preto and Salvador. In Rio de Janeiro, the teaching of Libras was made official in the curriculum of the municipal school system.

April 24th was made official as the National Day of Brazilian Sign Language.

== Alphabet ==
Libras fingerspelling uses a one-handed manual alphabet similar to that used by the French Sign Language family.

There are 44 distinct handshapes used in the language.

== Writing ==
Sutton SignWriting is the dominant writing system in Brazil. A master's in linguistics dissertation titled "A arte de escrever em Libras" by Gabriela Otaviani Barbosa found that SignWriting is used in 18 Federal Universities and in 12 public schools in Brazil.

Historical efforts were commonly transcribed using Portuguese words, written in upper case, to stand for each equivalent Libras morpheme.

Transcription of Libras signs using SignWriting has been in place since at least 1997 with the SignNet Project in Porto Alegre and Fernando Capovilla's dictionaries in São Paulo. The University of Santa Catarina at Florianopolis (UFSC) has required courses in SignWriting as the preferred form of LIBRAS transcription.

SignWriting is cited as being useful in the pedagogy of young children.

The Federal University of Santa Catarina has accepted a dissertation written in Brazilian Sign Language using Sutton SignWriting for a master's degree in linguistics. The dissertation "A escrita de expressões não manuais gramaticais em sentenças da Libras pelo Sistema signwriting" by João Paulo Ampessan states that "the data indicate the need for [non-manual expressions] usage in writing sign language".

== In film ==
In September 2017, new Libras accessibility requirements took effect in Brazil mandating availability of Brazilian Sign Language for films shown in Brazilian movie theaters. Sign language is displayed to moviegoers on a second screen device. Sign language is stored as a Sign Language Video track in the Digital Cinema Package (DCP), synchronized with the rest of the film. Sign Language Video tracks have no audio and are encoded as a VP9-compressed video encoded in PCM audio stored in Sound Track 15 of the DCP.

== Deaf and sign language organizations ==
The most important deaf organization is FENEIS, the Federação Nacional de Educação e Integração dos Surdos (National Federation of Deaf Education and Integration). There are a number of regional organizations in Curitiba, Caxias do Sul and Rio Grande do Sul.

== Classification ==
Wittmann (1991) posits that Brazilian Sign Language is a language isolate (a 'prototype' sign language), though one developed through stimulus diffusion from an existing sign language, likely Portuguese Sign Language and/or French Sign Language.

== See also ==
- Ka'apor Sign Language, an unrelated Indigenous sign language of Brazil.
