= Instituut voor Doven =

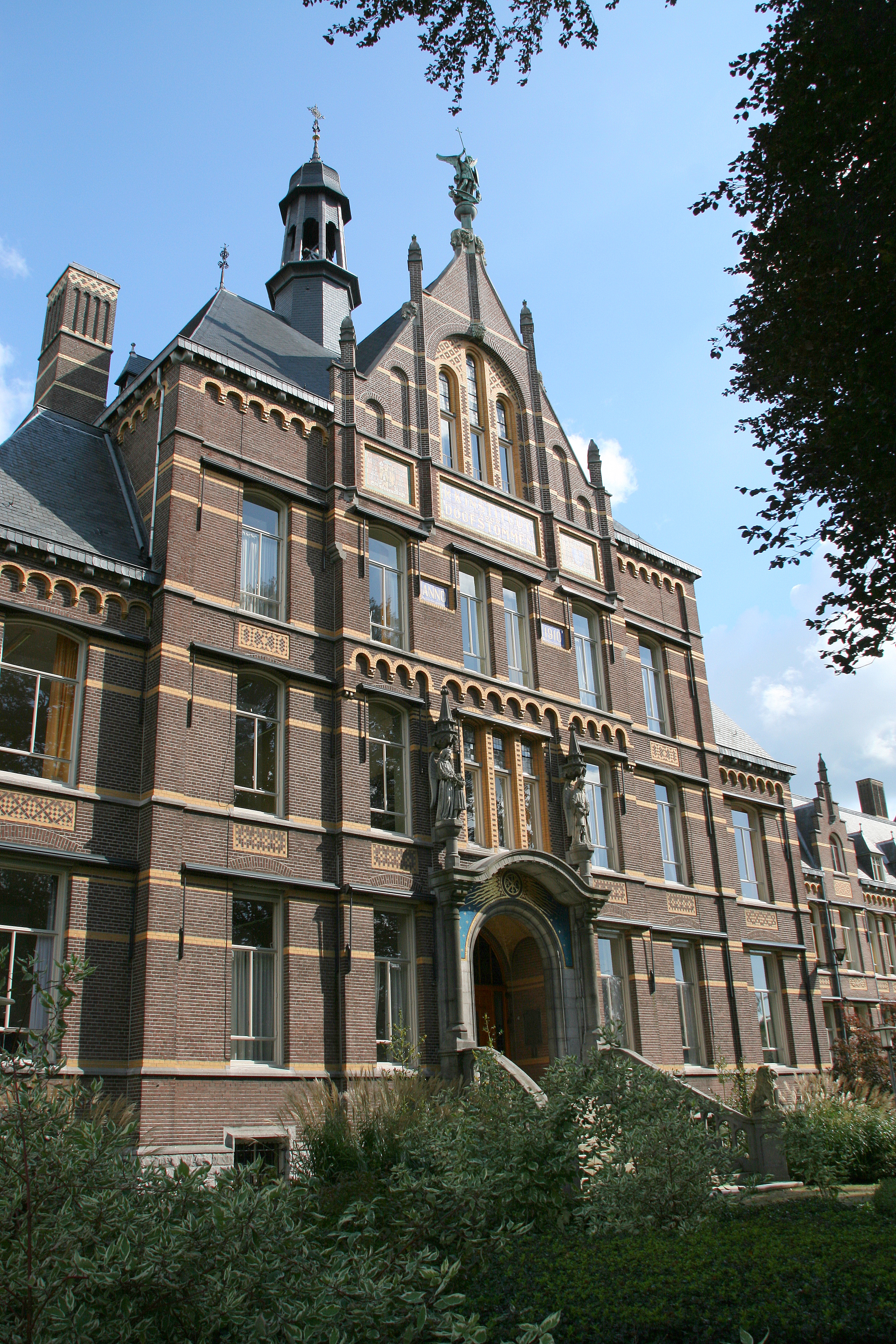

Location
- Theerestraat 42; 5271GD Sint-Michielsgestel, North Brabant; Netherlands
- Coordinates: 51°38′29.38″N 5°20′35.06″E

Information
- Founded: 1840
- Founder: Martinus van Beek

The Instituut voor Doven (IvD) was a deaf school, based in the south of the Netherlands for children who are deaf, hard-of-hearing and deaf-blind. It is referred by the deaf community as "gestel" when signed in Dutch Sign Language. The School was founded in 1840 by Father Martinus van Beek, a Roman Catholic priest. It was one of the five big deaf schools in the Netherlands.

== History ==
SInce 1828, Van Beek gave religious instruction to the four deaf children in Gemert, North Brabant, using a mixture of sign language, writing and fingerspelling. The motivation behind his teaching was to teach the Scriptures as he was anxious about deaf Catholics not knowing Church teachings. At that time, there was another deaf school in the north of the Netherlands, established in 1790. As Henri_Daniel_Guyot_Instituut in Groningen was led by a Protestant, Van Beek was quite anxious to create a boarding school for deaf children from Catholic families, to prevent them from going to Groningen.

With help from the Roman Catholic Bishops of 's-Hertogenbosch and Breda, Van Beek was given the castle Nieuw-Herlaar at Sint-Michielsgestel. which was used as a former seminary. The Zusters van de Choorstraat were asked to come and help teaching deaf children, They came on 15 September 1840 in St. Michielsgestel. Five years later in 1845, the Brothers of Maastricht came to educate the boys at IvD. In 1908, the foundation stone for the huge neo-Gothic building was laid on Theerestraat, Sint-Michielsgestel. The design was done by Hubert van Groenendael. The new building was completed in 1910 and the School moved out of the castle. Due to dwindling numbers of the Sisters in their Order, 31 October 1990 saw the last two Sisters leaving the School.

== Hostiebakkerij St. Michael ==
In 1844, the Sisters started Hostiebakkerij St. Michael which is a wafer bakery, created as an employment scheme for deaf people. There they would make communion breads and sell them to churches and Catholic organisations. It is now taken over by Kentalis. There the hosts are produced for churches in the Netherlands, the United States, the United Kingdom and Suriname. Hosts are sent to missionaries. After many years, a new building was built on Mgr. Hermuslaan, a stone's throw from the old bakery. It is one of the largest host bakeries, producing approximately 70m hosts every year, including gluten-free wafers.

== Language Use at IvD ==
At its location at Nieuw-Herlaar, oralism was introduced gradually in 1855 with sign language being banned in 1990. From the beginning, the School used the Van Beek gestures system, which is still used there today, mainly with deaf people with intellectual disabilities. A few interpreters reported saying they still use the system as their deaf parents were educated at IvD.

After the School's change to oralism, the use of sign language and gestures was actively discouraged with children being punished in the classroom. This happened both psychologically (through public lists of students who are most gestures were made) as physically, through the tying of hands and repeatedly hitting the fingers with a ruler after occasional use of gestures. It is speculated that the quality of education was in decline because much time was spent on speech training at the expense of other subjects and general language development.

Professor Bernard Tervoort, a former teacher at IvD, got into a fight with the school in 1964 about language use there as Father Van Uden discouraged the use of sign language there. However, from the 1990s, the School started to understand Tervoort's arguments who was way ahead of his time. Viataal had two of Tervoort's PhD students on its board of trustees.

== Merge ==
The merge between IvD and the Nijmegen-based Mgr. Terwindt Foundation was taken place in 1998 with the new name being IvD / MTW. In 2003, it was renamed as Viataal, with its main offices being on the IvD campus. In 2009, it was decided that Viataal was to be merged with KEGG and Sint-Marie to consolidate as Kentalis.

== Controversy ==
The School was the last deaf school in the Netherlands resisting the adoption of sign bilingualism campaigned by the deaf community, however with Kentalis taking over Viataal (the IvD successor organisation), sign bilingualism is enforced.

In 2002, sexual abuse among the pupils there at the School was reported. A book written by a former pupil was released at the same time, recounting his experiences with sexual abuse at IvD.
