= Ukrainian manual alphabet =

Alphabet used in Ukrainian Sign Language

The Ukrainian Manual Alphabet is used for fingerspelling in Ukrainian Sign Language.

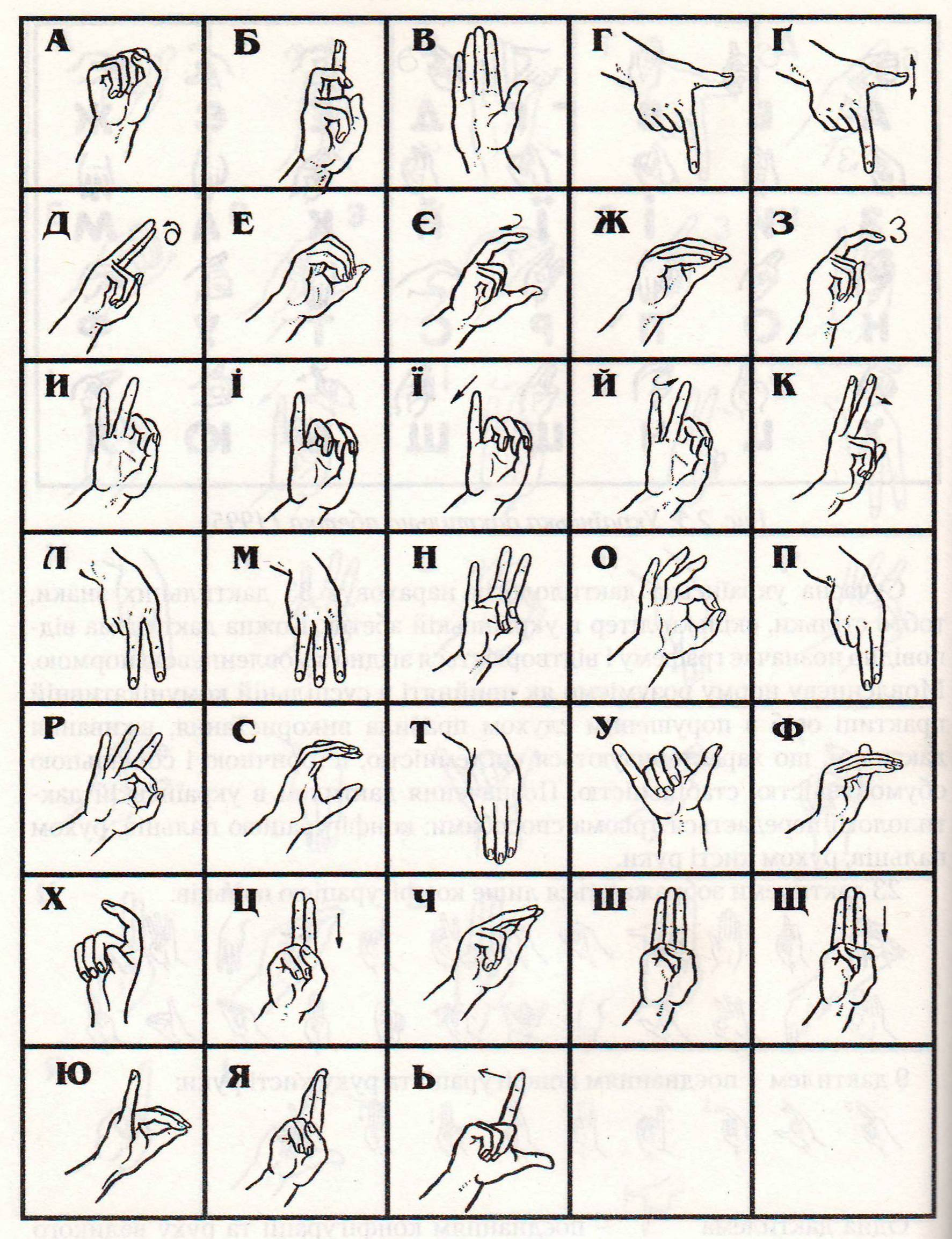
Ukrainian Manual Alphabet (UMA), post 2003. Differs from Soviet type of UMA in that it contains Ґ

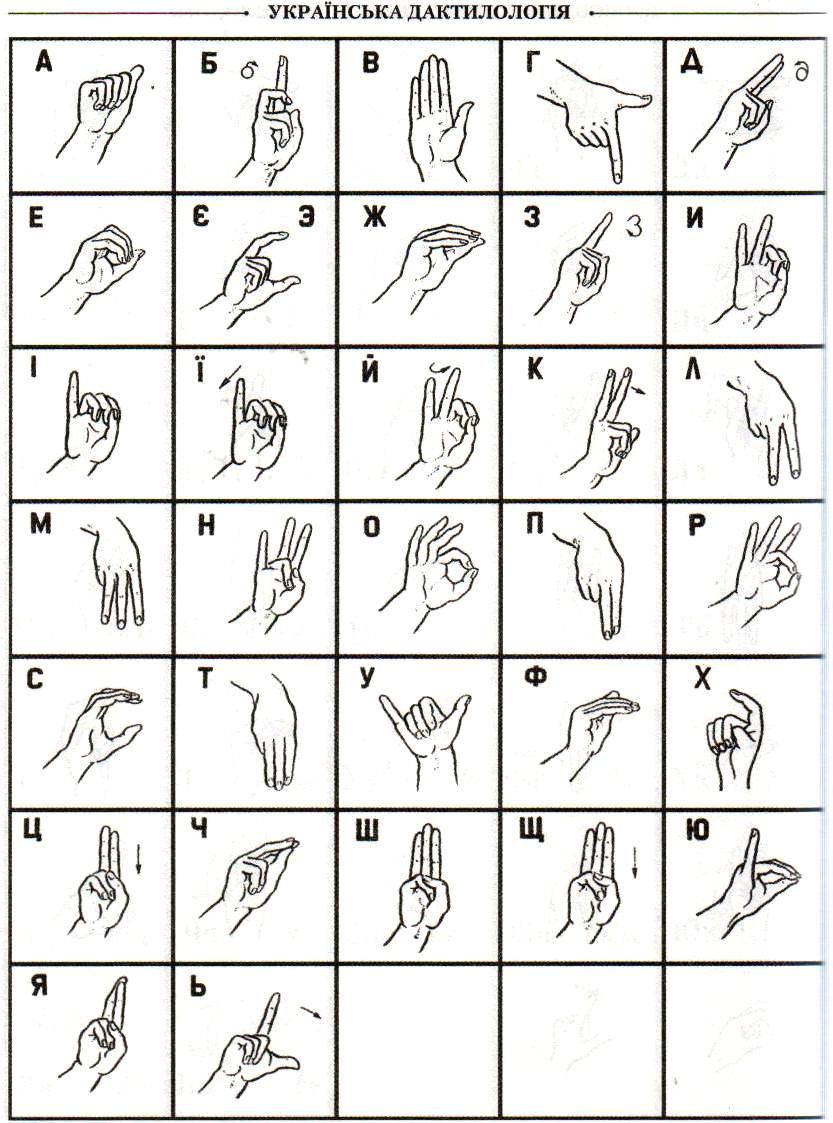
Soviet type of Ukrainian Manual Alphabet (UMA), used prior to 2003. Differs from the UMA used in independent Ukraine in that it lacks Ґ

The modern Ukrainian dactylic alphabet has 33 dactylic characters, which is the same number as the letters in the Ukrainian alphabet.
