= Czech Sign Language =

Deaf sign language of Czech Republic

- Český znakový jazyk
- Native to: Czech Republic
- Region: Central Europe
- Native speakers: 12,000 (2011 census); 10,000 (2014)
- Language family: French Sign: Austro-Hungarian Sign; Czech Sign Language

Language codes
- ISO 639-3: cse
- Glottolog: czec1253
- ELP: Czech Sign Language

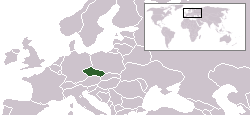
Location of the Czech Republic

Czech Sign Language (Czech: Český znakový jazyk, ČZJ) is the sign language of the deaf community in the Czech Republic. It presumably emerged around the time of the first deaf school in Bohemia (1786). It belongs to the French sign-language family and is partially intelligible with French sign language. Both ČZJ and Slovak Sign Language are descendant from Austro-Hungarian Sign language.
