= Venezuelan Sign Language =

Deaf sign language of Venezuela

- Lengua de señas venezolana
- Native to: Venezuela
- Native speakers: 86,000 (2021)
- Language family: Language isolate?

Language codes
- ISO 639-3: vsl
- Glottolog: vene1237
- ELP: Venezuelan Sign Language

Venezuelan Sign Language (VSL; Spanish: Lengua de señas venezolana, LSV) is the national deaf sign language of Venezuela. The term, "Venezuelan Sign Language," began to be used in the 1930s. It is widely used, and Venezuela has a national bilingual education program for VSL and Spanish, though the language used by adults differs from that of the classroom. There is a large VSL dictionary published by the Federación Venezolana de Sordos. VSL has been used in schools since 1937.

== Origin ==
The first known references to a Deaf community which used a sign language in Venezuela date from the 1930s. In 1935, the first school for children who are deaf or hard of hearing, the Instituto Venezolano de Ciegos y Sordomudos (Venezuelan Blind and Deaf Institute), was founded in Caracas. That school served as the cradle for a small community of signers, who created a sign language out of many signs which the children had used at home. A few years later the administration of the institute decided to separate the instruction of blind and deaf students and created the Escuela Taller de Sordomudos (Workshop School for the Prelingually Deaf). This school hired hearing teachers trained in Spain, who knew Spanish Sign language. The mingling of the system developed by the students and the language used by the teachers seems to be the origin of what is today VSL.

In 1950, the first generation of alumni of the schools founded the Asociación de Sordomudos de Caracas (Deaf Association of Caracas), under the direction of José Arquero Urbano, an immigrant who had been a leader of the Deaf community in Madrid. The influence of the signs brought by Arquero further transformed VSL, according to recollections collected from people involved in that period of the Association. Because of this many Venezuelan Deaf people assume that Arquero was the creator of VSL.

== Legal status ==
In 1999, after intensive lobbying by the Deaf associations of Venezuela, the constituent assembly included two references to LSV in the current constitution of Venezuela. Article 81 recognizes the right of Deaf people to communicate through LSV and Article 101 establishes that Deaf people have the right to be informed in their language through public and private television.

LSV, nevertheless, retains a lower legal status than the language officially recognized by the constitution. Article 9 grants the status of an "official language" to Spanish (throughout the nation) and to native languages (in the ancestral territories). LSV does not receive such recognition. The constitution only recognizes the right to use LSV.

== LSV studies ==
Studies on LSV indicate that the language has the same structural elements described in other sign languages, such as, the use of directional signs, the use of signs with classifiers, changes in the form of the sign to indicate mood and aspect, and a strong pragmatical dependence in defining argument roles. In addition, as a result of studies on the grammar of LSV, there has also been research into the psycholinguistics, sociolinguistics and ethnolinguistics of the Deaf community in the country.

== Number of LSV users ==
Included among the users of LSV are both the Deaf who use the language as their principal means of communication and hearing people who have a range of fluency in LSV.

The number of users is unknown. There are 1.2 million deaf in Venezuela, but most lost their hearing late in life. There were over 3000 deaf children in the national public school system in 2004, and around 9000 members of Deaf associations; with around 0.2% of children typically born deaf, there are an estimated congenitally 15,000 deaf people in Venezuela. However, it is not known how many of them speak VSL.
