= Old French Sign Language =

Attested sign language

Old French Sign
- Vieille Langue des Signes Française
- Native to: France; Pondicherry; French India
- Native speakers: Estimated 200 in Paris (1750s)
- Language family: French Sign
- Dialects: French Sign Language

Language codes
- ISO 639-3: None (mis)
- Glottolog: None

Old French Sign Language (French: Vieille langue des signes française, VLSF) was the language of the deaf community in 18th-century Paris at the time of the establishment of the first deaf schools. The earliest records of the language are in the work of the Abbé de l'Épée, who stumbled across two sisters communicating in signs and, through them, became aware of a signing community of 200 deaf Parisians.

Records of the language they used are scant. Épée saw their signing as beautiful but primitive, and rather than studying or recording it, he set about developing his own unique sign system ("langage de signes méthodiques"), which borrowed signs from Old French Sign Language and combined them with an idiosyncratic morphemic structure which he derived from the French language. The term "Old French Sign Language" has occasionally been used to describe Épée's "systematised signs", and he has often been (erroneously) cited as the inventor of sign language.

Épée, however, influenced the language of the deaf community, and modern French Sign Language can be said to have emerged in the schools that Épée established. As deaf schools inspired by Épée's model sprung up around the world, the language was to influence the development of many other sign languages, including American Sign Language. From the dictionaries of "systematised signs" that the Abbé de l'Épée and his successor, Abbé Roch-Ambroise Cucurron Sicard, published, one can see that many of the signs described have direct descendants in sign languages today.

Pierre Desloges, who was deaf himself and a contemporary of the Abbe de l'Épée, partially described Old French Sign Language in what was possibly the first book ever to be published by a deaf person (1779). The language certainly used of the possibilities of a spatial grammar. One of the grammatical features noted by Desloges was the use of directional verbs, such as the verb "to want".

From the few descriptions that exist, modern linguists are unable to build up a complete picture of Old French Sign Language, but ongoing research continues to uncover more pieces of the puzzle. It is not known how the language was acquired or how long the language had been developing before Épée established his school. However, evidence suggests that whenever a large enough population of deaf people exists, a sign language will spontaneously arise (cf. Nicaraguan Sign Language). As Paris had been the largest city in France for hundreds of years (and with 565,000 inhabitants in 1750), French Sign Language is a good candidate for one of the oldest sign languages in Europe.

Old French Sign Language is not related to Old French, which was spoken from roughly 1000 to 1300.
