= Slovak Sign Language =

Deaf sign language of Slovakia

- Slovenský posunkový jazyk
- Native to: Slovakia
- Native speakers: 15,000 (2014)
- Language family: French Sign: Austro-Hungarian Sign; Slovak Sign Language

Language codes
- ISO 639-3: svk
- Glottolog: slov1263

The Slovak Sign Language (Slovak: Slovenský posunkový jazyk, SPJ) is the sign language of the deaf community in Slovakia. It belongs to the French sign-language family. Bickford (2005) found that Slovak, Czech, and Hungarian Sign formed a cluster with Romanian, Bulgarian, and Polish Sign.

Despite the similarity of oral Slovak and Czech, SSL is not particularly close to Czech Sign Language.
