= French Belgian Sign Language =

Deaf sign language of Belgium

- Langue des signes de Belgique francophone (LSFB)
- Native to: French Community of Belgium
- Native speakers: 4,000 (2014)
- Language family: French Sign?: Belgian Sign Language; French Belgian Sign Language

Language codes
- ISO 639-3: sfb
- Glottolog: lang1248

The French Belgian Sign Language (French: langue des signes belge francophone, LSFB) is the deaf sign language of the French language Community of Belgium, a country in Western Europe.

It is closely related to the Flemish Sign Language, with differences primarily in mouthings, but is generally regarded today as distinct from it. It is distantly if at all related to French Sign Language.

== Legal recognition ==
By decree of 22 October 2003, the Parliament of the French Community recognised the Sign Language of French-speaking Belgium.

== See also ==
- Signed French
