= Flemish Sign Language =

Sign language used in Belgium

- Vlaamse Gebarentaal (VGT)
- Native to: Belgium
- Region: Flanders and Brussels
- Native speakers: 6,000 (2005) to 5,000 (2014)
- Language family: French Sign?: Belgian Sign Language; Flemish Sign Language

Official status
- Recognised minority language in: Flemish Community

Language codes
- ISO 639-3: vgt
- Glottolog: vlaa1235
- ELP: Flemish Sign Language

Flemish Sign Language (Dutch: Vlaamse Gebarentaal, VGT) is a deaf sign language of Belgium. It is closely related to French Belgian Sign Language, but they are now generally recognized as distinct languages. VGT is estimated to include around 6,000 sign-language users (Loots et al., 2003).

== History ==
When the first deaf schools were established in Flanders, the teachers were directly or indirectly influenced by the methods used at the Institution Nationale des Sourds-Muets à Paris (and consequently by French Sign Language). They either followed training programs in Paris or in two deaf schools in the Netherlands (Groningen and Sint-Michielsgestel), which were themselves influenced by the Paris school.

As with other neighbouring countries, the education of deaf children was strongly influenced by the resolutions that took place at the Milan Conference in 1880. These resolutions banned the use of signs in the education of deaf children in favour of an oral approach. It has been viewed as a dark day in the history of sign language. In 2010, the World Federation of the Deaf renounced the oralist resolutions of the 1880 Milan Conference.

By the beginning of the 20th century, there was a deaf school in every major town in Flanders. Some towns even had two: one for boys and one for girls. Most of the schools were residential and pupils only went home during the holidays, and later on also during the weekends. As a result, regional sign language varieties started to develop around every school.

== Regional variation ==
It is now generally accepted and confirmed by research that Flemish Sign Language consists of five regional varieties. They have developed in and around the different Flemish deaf schools: West Flanders, East Flanders, Antwerp, Flemish Brabant, and Limburg (De Weerdt et al., 2003).

Besides the differences between regions, there is also intra-regional variation. Until the 1970s, there were separate schools for deaf boys and girls, which has led to gender variation. Some signs which are commonly used today were boys' or girls' signs in origin. There are more reasons for the relatively high degree of intra-regional variation.

At the moment there is no standardized sign language in Flanders. There is however an ongoing process of spontaneous standardization (mostly due to increased contact between deaf people from different regions).

== Federalization ==
Another important aspect influencing the language is the federalization process which has taken place in Belgium along ethnic lines as Flemish or Walloon. Today, every Belgian belongs to a certain linguistic group and the same goes for deaf people. Ironically they are also considered Flemish or Walloon, part of the linguistic majority of speakers of Dutch or French, despite the sign language they use and the linguistic minority to which they belong. Sign language rights are administered by the Flemish community on behalf of DHH people in Flanders and Brussels.

The federalization occurred in 1993, which was the result of a long process. Cultural activities have been organized separately since then, and the Flemish and the Walloon deaf clubs have been subsidized from different sources. Contacts between Flemish and Walloon deaf people have become less and less frequent. This affected the sign languages' development in both communities, which are becoming more divergent as they go through separate standardization processes.

Therefore, the name for the sign language has changed over time. "Belgian Sign Language" became "Flemish-Belgian Sign Language", which later became the now preferred "Flemish Sign Language" on the Flemish side. On the Wallonian side, "French Belgian Sign Language" became "Walloon Sign Language".

In the 1970s, the national deaf federation, Navekados, split up into a Flemish and a Walloon federation. The current deaf organization of the Flemish Community is Doof Vlaanderen vzw, which has evolved from previous organizations as outlined below. This organization and its predecessors have been part of the European Union of the Deaf (EUD) since its founding in 1985.

- 1936 Nationaal Verbond der Katholieke Deof-mute-bonds (Navekados) was formed as the organization for all deaf Belgians
- 1977 Flemish & Waloon split into Federation of the Dutch-speaking Deaf Associations (Fenedo) & Féderation Francophone des Sourds de Belgique (FFSB)
- 1986 Fenedo became Fevlado (Federatie van Vlaamse Dovenorganisaties or Federation of the Flemish Deaf Organizations)
- 1986 Cultuur voor Deaf vzw (vereniging zonder winstoogmerk) was founded as a non-profit organization
- 2002 Cultuur voor Deaf became Fevlado-Diversus vzw
- 2017 Fevlado vzw & Fevlado-Diversus vzw merge into Doof Vlaanderen vzw

== Legal recognition ==
On 26 April 2006, the Flemish Parliament unanimously recognised the Flemish Sign Language as a language in Flanders. The decree consists of three major parts:

Recognition
The Flemish Sign Language is recognised as a language in the Flemish Community, including the Brussels-Capital Region.
Advisory committee
An advisory committee on the Flemish Sign Language is instated, with a maximum of fifteen members, half of which have to be deaf. Advise can be requested by the Flemish Government or the Flemish Parliament, but the committee can also formulate advises autonomously.
Knowledge and information centre
The decree arranges the recognition of a knowledge and information centre which has to: coordinate and stimulate linguistic research, support the further development of VGT, develop educational tools for use in teaching VGT and be the first point of contact.

Belgium ratified the United Nations Convention on the Rights of Persons with Disabilities (UNCRPD) on 2 July 2009.

== Flemish Deaf Parliament ==
In 2013–2014, Ghent University and Fevlado organized a series of town halls for the Flemish deaf community. Dr. Goedele A. M. De Clerck, a Flemish scholar specializing in deaf culture, helped facilitate this initiative and published an academic article summarizing the experience.

The G1000 democratic participation initiative/think tank in Belgium guided the methodology of integration employed by the Flemish Deaf Parliament. In the G1000, members of different language groups were put in the same room to assess feelings towards the other group, and observe how discussion between the groups changed these feelings.

The Flemish Deaf Parliament was meant to involve the deaf community in decision making and Flemish life. The discussions spanned a wide variety of topics, including increased access to information for the Flemish deaf population, means of increasing political participation, the cultural and sociolinguistic history of the Flemish deaf population, and the continuation of a Flemish deaf community. Education and career opportunities were discussed, including access to lifelong education, increasing social mobility for DHH people, and effective support for students through the transition from deaf schools to mainstreaming. The need for more interaction between age groups in the deaf community, particularly to provide role models; assisted transitions between stages of life; and improvement of elder care were also discussed. A focus on deaf empowerment and learning from other deaf communities around the world was also present.

Currently, many of these needs are met by deaf clubs throughout Flanders. To name a few, Nowedo in Bruges, De Haerne Club in Kortrijk, Madosa in Antwerp, Piramime in Turnhout, and Limburgia in Hasselt all provide access to resources and socialization for the Flemish deaf community.

== Usage ==
Since December 2012, the VRT news broadcast is available in the Flemish Sign Language.

The Flemish Parliament had sign language interpreters for the parliamentary debates while Helga Stevens, who is deaf, was member of the parliament.

Infant hearing screenings were first widely implemented in Flanders in 1998. As of 2019, approximately 97% of all newborns in Flanders receive hearing screening before the age of three months. Vestibular screening is also conducted around six months of age for infants with identified hearing loss. Linguistic milestone evaluations are also conducted before children reach two years of age, using a methodology adapted from the ASL VCSL checklist into VGT.
