= Bhutanese Sign Language =

Deaf sign language of Bhutan

- BhSL
- Drukgi Lagdai Khakay
- Native to: Bhutan
- Language family: unclassified

Language codes
- ISO 639-3: dyl
- Glottolog: bhut1234

Bhutanese Sign Language (BhSL; Drukgi Lagdai Khakay in Dzongkha) is the indigenous sign language of Bhutan, used especially at the Wangsel Institute for the Deaf, Paro, Bhutan.

Bhutan set up the program for the deaf in a hearing school in Thimphu ca. 2000, and the first dedicated school, in Paro, was approved in 2013. Part of government funding for deaf education includes developing Bhutanese Sign Language as the language of instruction. Development includes at least creating vocabulary for technical subjects, and deciding on which regional signs to use where they differ.

It is not clear if there are multiple sign languages in Bhutan, or merely local differences in vocabulary. It is unknown whether Bhutanese Sign Language is related to Indian Sign Language or Nepali Sign Language.

== Relevant literature ==
- Hofer, Theresia (forthcoming) 'Signed Languages in the Greater Himalayas and Tibet' In: Hildebrandt, K.; Modi, Yankee; Peterson, David and Hi. Suzuki (Eds.) The Oxford Guide to Tibeto-Burman Languages. Oxford: Oxford University Press.
