= Austrian Sign Language =

Deaf sign language of Austria

- Österreichische Gebärdensprache (ÖGS)
- Native to: Austria
- Native speakers: 8,000 (2014)
- Language family: French Sign: Austro-Hungarian Sign; Austrian Sign Language

Language codes
- ISO 639-3: asq
- Glottolog: aust1252

Austrian Sign Language (German: Österreichische Gebärdensprache, ÖGS) is the sign language used by the Austrian Deaf community—approximately 10,000 people (see Krausneker 2006).

== Classification ==
ÖGS and Hungarian Sign Language seem to be related for historical reasons (First School for the Deaf in Vienna), but HSL forms a cluster with neighboring languages rather than with ÖGS. Although there are no detailed studies of the extent of relatedness, ÖGS shares aspects of its grammar with German Sign Language and Swiss Sign Language, while the vocabulary differs (see Skant et al. 2002); Wittmann (1991) places it in the French Sign Language family.

== Research ==
Linguistic research on ÖGS started in the 1990s and is primarily conducted at the University of Klagenfurt and University of Graz. The Alpen-Adria-Universität Klagenfurt (AAU) worked on the "Deaf learning" project (September 1, 2015 – August 31, 2018) financed under Erasmus+ as a cooperation for innovation and the exchange of good practices, strategic Partnerships for adult education aimed at deaf adults with Austrian Sign Language as their first natural language and the German written language as their second language with the aim of raising the level of literacy. The program was expanded by Eramus+ after its completion to promote achieving higher social, educational and financial positions through better access to the written language proficiency with the "Deaf language awareness" project (September 1, 2018 – July 7, 2021) by developing online courses for independent learning in ÖGS and written German text.

== Legal aspects ==
After a 15-year effort by the Deaf community, ÖGS was legally recognized by the Austrian Parliament on September 1, 2005.

== Fingerspelling ==
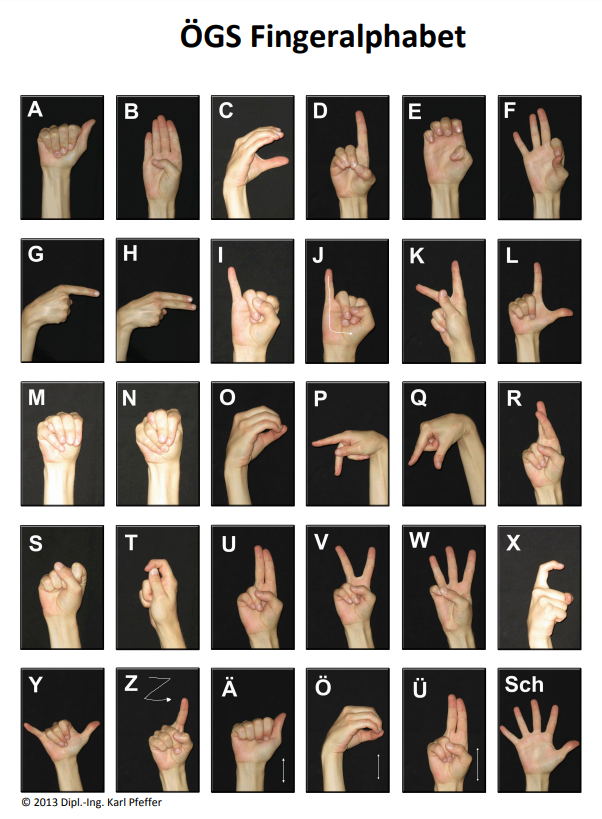
ÖGS Fingeralphabet

ÖGS possess hundred of signs, of which 26 signs represent single letters similar to the basic written German alphabet, 3 signs represent letter-diacritic combinations (Ä/ä, Ö/ö, Ü/ü) using the umlaut and 1 sign represents the German "sch" (trigraph).

== Associations ==
The Austrian Deaf community is represented by the Austrian Federation of the Deaf (the Österreichischer Gehörlosenbund).

There is one nationwide association for professional interpreters of ÖGS.

== See also ==
- Austrian-German
- Austro-Bavarian
- Austrian Federation of the Deaf
