= French Sign Language =

Sign language used predominately in France and French-speaking Switzerland

French Sign
- Langue des signes française
- LSF in French manual alphabet
- Native to: France, Switzerland
- Signers: 100,000 (2019)
- Language family: French Sign: French Sign
- Early form: Old French Sign
- Dialects: Marseille Sign Language

Language codes
- ISO 639-3: fsl – inclusive code Individual code: ssr – Swiss-French; Sign Language
- Glottolog: fren1243 French; Sign Language swis1241 Swiss-French; Sign Language
- ELP: Swiss-French Sign Language

French Sign Language (French: langue des signes française, LSF) is the sign language of deaf and hard-of-hearing people in France. LSF is the first language used by French citizens, and is used as a second language by a significant number of hearing and deaf French people. Although the exact number of users are uncertain, there are between 80,000 and 120,000 deaf users of LSF, out of a total of approximately 280,000 users.

== History ==
In the 1760s, Charles-Michel de l'Épée, a Jansenist priest and educator, founded the first public school for the Deaf in the world. He met two Deaf sisters, who inspired him to learn their "natural language" to teach them citizenship and Christianity. With their help, he spent most of the decade expanding their language with the purpose of representing "abstract concepts important to religion and metaphysics", subjecting it to the rules of general grammar, and codifying it. He called the result "methodical" sign language. De l'Épée was the first person to use a form of Old French Sign Language to educate the Deaf.

According to Oliver Sachs, de l'Épée believed sign language was the universal language philosophers wished for and that it provided the "key to all languages". Sachs also said that de l'Épée's use of sign language to educate the deaf was revolutionary because Enlightenment philosophy held that "the understanding of ideas depended upon the hearing of words". Scholar Sophia Rosenfield agreed, stating that de l'Épée's story was within "the realm of legend" and provided a "foundational 'creative myth' for the disciplines of Deaf history". Rosenfeld also states that de l'Épée's work is central to Deaf history because it was "deeply connected" to the founding of many modern institutions for educating the Deaf, including Gallaudet University in the U.S., as well as to the educational methods still used today. According to Rosenfeld, de l'Épée's experiments with Old French Sign Language and the fate of French Deaf people during the 1790s were linked to the fate of France and the politics of the era, when Sign Language was praised as "a miracle of patriotism" and "one of the great tools as well as achievements of the age".

Sachs considered de l'Épée's use of Old French Sign Language to educate the Deaf revolutionary. Sacks stated that using the indigenous language of the Deaf in France, de l'Épée opened up the world's learning and culture to the Deaf". His system of "methodical" signs, which Sachs called "a combination of their own Signs with signed French grammar", enabled his students to write down what was said to them through an interpreter. Sacks and Deaf historians Ulf Hedberg and Harlan Lane claimed that this method allowed Deaf people to read and write French and to gain an education for the first time. According to Hedberg and Lane, de l'Épée's system was used in the classroom, while Old LSF was used among the Deaf community and was never formally taught. It was acquired from older students and from the Deaf faculty, who "used it in the classroom much as any foreign language teacher might use the native language of the pupils to teach them another tongue". Sachs stated that despite de l'Épée's "immense admiration" for Old LFS and this view that it was complete form of communication, he also had reservations about the language. He believed that Old LFS lacked inner structure and a grammar. Author Gerald Shea stated that instead of learning his Deaf students' language, de l'Épée' combined his methodical signs with Old French Sign Language and his own "complementary" signs, which Shea thought "resulted in an unintelligible system".

American Sign Language (ASL) has its roots in LSF. In 1817, Thomas Gallaudet and Laurent Clerc, a Deaf student at de l'Épée's Institut National de Jeunes Sourds de Paris, co-founded the first public school for the Deaf in the U.S., in Hartford, Connecticut. Clerc introduced manualism in the U.S., teaching the students his native language, Old FSL, "the ancestor of contemporary ASL". According to Sachs, Old LSF quickly merged with the American indigenous sign languages used at the time, eventually becoming ASL.

By the mid-1970s, oralism as an ideology and educational methodology "reigned supreme in the education of Deaf children and teenagers" in France. LSF became forbidden in the classroom and was often banned in all places associated with the institutions Deaf students attended. According to linguist Christian Cuxoc, it resulted in the delay of Deaf children's progress during their first ten years of elementary school, compared with their hearing counterparts.

In 1975, a small group of participants at the World Federation of the Deaf (WFD) meetings in Washington, D.C., met to develop an alternative to the educational practices in France. In 1977, the Ministry of Health lifted the ban of LSF in educational settings, and the use of LSF was permitted in homes, high schools, and universities starting in 1980. In 1991, the Fabius Law was passed that authorized the choice of a bilingual education in both French and LSF for Deaf students. In 1996, there was a national demonstration of Deaf people that called for the official recognition of LSF as a language in France, and a national march was held in eight French cities, also calling for the official recognition of LSF. The French government finally made that recognition in February 2005 by passing Article L312-9-1.

== Grammar ==
Linguist Christian Cuxac defended LSF by demonstrating, like William Stokoe had done in the U.S. in 1960 for ASL and was at the time also being done for other European sign languages, that LSF had a double articulation, which French linguists considered evidence that LSF was indeed a language.

=== Fingerspelling ===
French left-handed fingerspelling alphabet

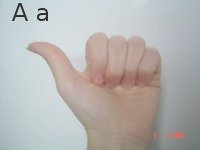
The letter A

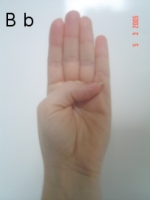
The letter B

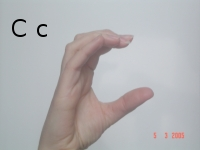
The letter C

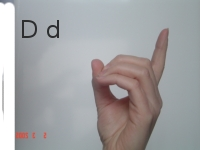
The letter D

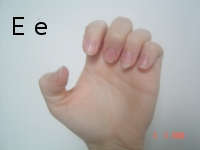
The letter E

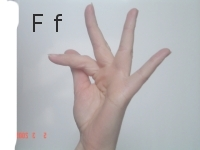
The letter F

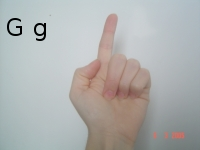
The letter G

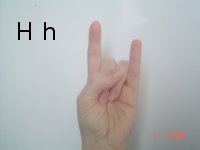
The letter H

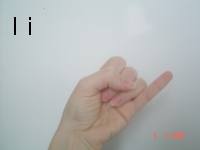
The letter I

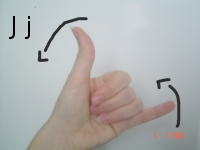
The letter J

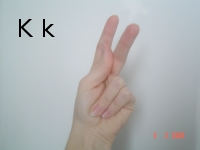
The letter K

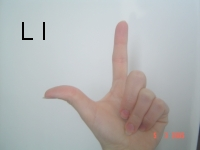
The letter L

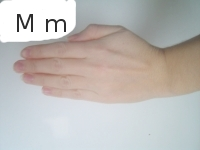
The letter M

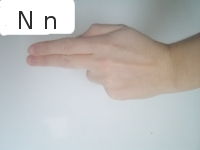
The letter N

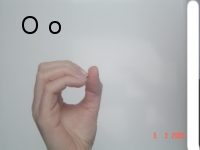
The letter O

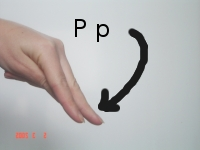
The letter P

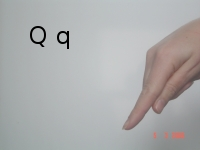
The letter Q

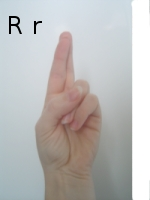
The letter R

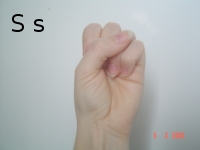
The letter S

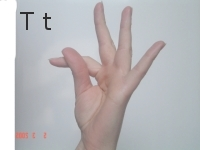
The letter T

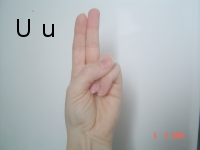
The letter U

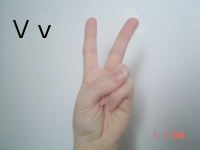
The letter V

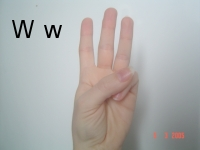
The letter W

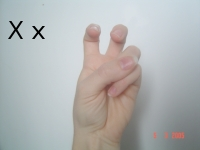
The letter X

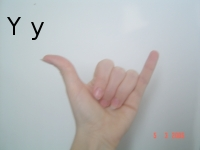
The letter Y

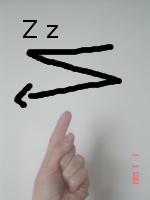
The letter Z

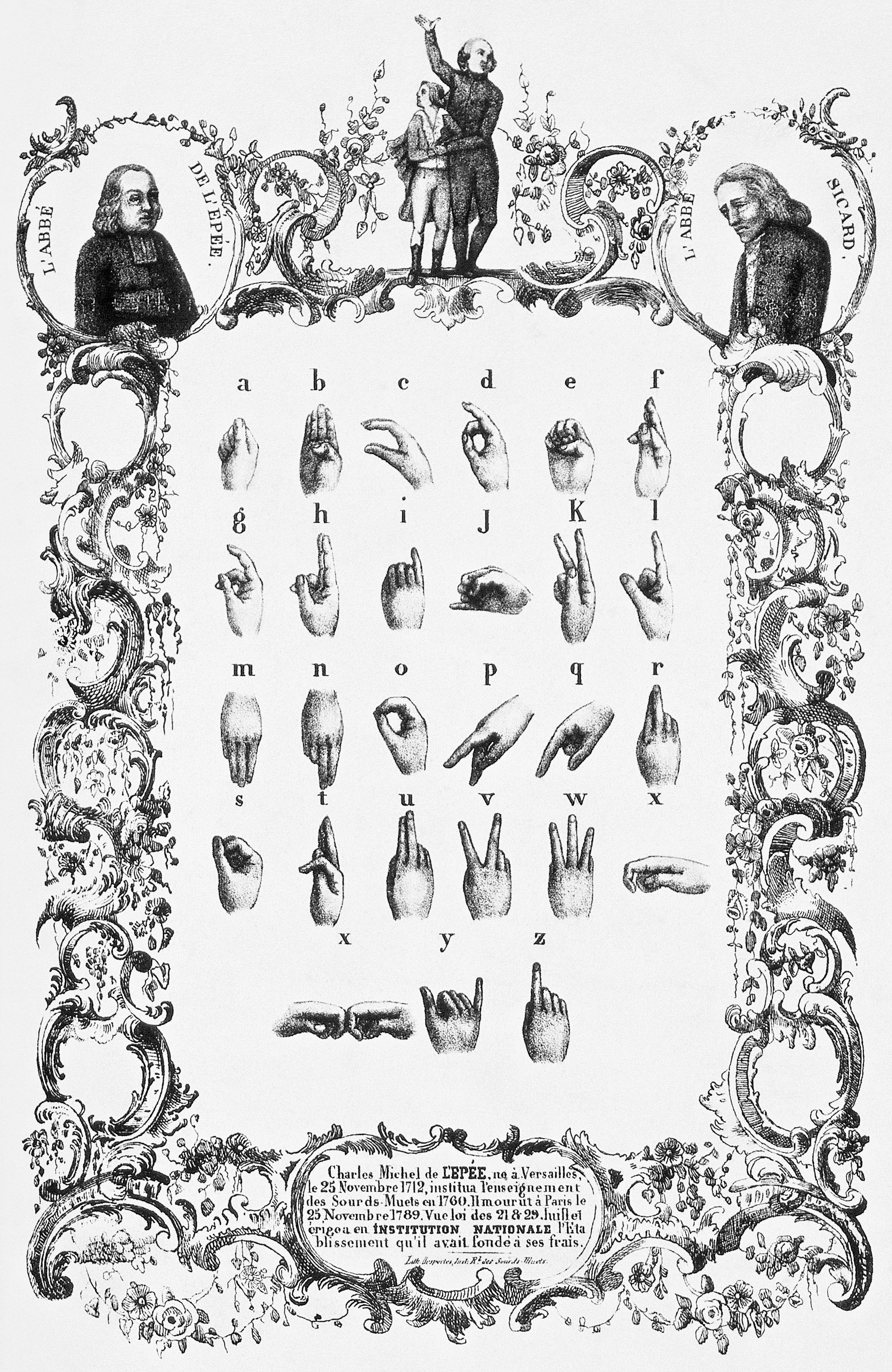
Vintage illustration of the French fingerspelling

== Works cited ==
- Cuxac, Christian (Winter 2024). "Linguistic Resurgence—Exploring Iconicity in French Sign Language". Sign Language Studies. 24 (2): 390–405.
- Hedberg, Ulf; Lane, Harlan (2020). Elements of French Deaf Heritage. Washington, D.C.: Gallaudet University Press. ISBN 978-1944838560.
- Rosenfeld, Sophia (Fall 2005). "The Political Uses of Sign Language: The Case of the French Revolution". Sign Language Studies. 6 (1): 17–37.
- Sacks, Oliver (1989). Seeing Voices: A Journey Into the World of the Deaf. New York: Vintage Books. ISBN 0-5200-6083-0.
