= Gacería =

Cant of the workers of Cantalejo, Segovia, Spain

- Gacería, Briquero, Briquería
- Native to: Spain
- Region: Province of Segovia
- Language family
- Writing system: Latin

Official status
- Official language in: It is not officially recognized. (It has a certain recognition in local signage. It appears in official documents of the Sepúlveda community since at least December 9, 1519 and of the city council since 1603.)
- Regulated by: There is no official standardizing body (The Cantalejo City Council has been compiling its use since 1993.)

Language codes
- ISO 639-3: –
- Extension of the variant in the province of Segovia and its surroundings Siglo XXI: Ciudad de Cantalejo Ochavo de Cantalejo with some presence of the variant Other municipalities with strong historical reminiscences of well-known gazebos Rest of the province with little presence Extinto: Remains of the Comunidad de Villa y Tierra de Sepúlveda, with notable recognition at least during the 16th century

Gacería, also known as briquería or briquero, is a linguistic variant whose core has its origins between the 12th and 13th centuries, it was especially rooted during the 19th and 20th centuries as cant and slang within the professional world of threshing and farming implement manufacturers, cattle dealers as well as other traditional commercial activities, although its use is not limited to work activity.

It is spoken especially in the Segovian city of Cantalejo and neighboring municipalities, although it is lukewarmly extended in other areas of the province of Segovia, in Castile and León, Spain.

Gacería incorporated Galician, French, Basque and Arabic words into its vocabulary, a linguistic practice employed also by traveling professional groups of Castile. Users of Gacería also incorporated words from Caló (Spanish Romani), Germanic languages and Catalan. These trade routes did not usually extend into the Basque Country or Valencia, but words from these foreign lexicons were incorporated for their foreignness.

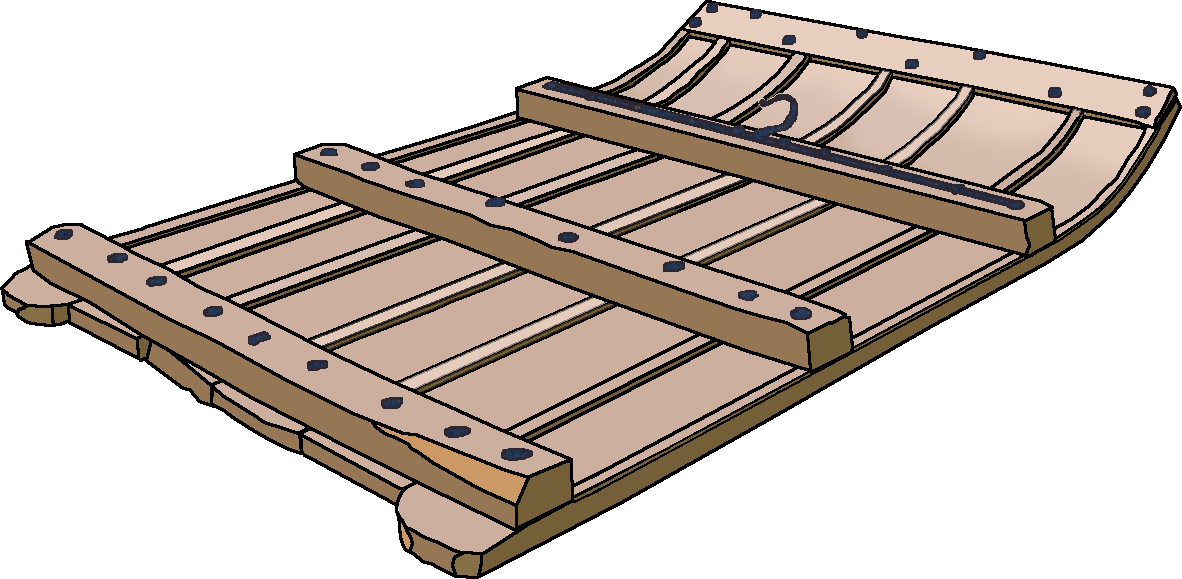
A Spanish trillo (threshing-board)

== Geographical distribution ==
=== Historical ===
In addition to the current extension, during the 16th century and previously, the presence of the gacería was greater and with a less exclusive dedication to the world of commerce. On December 9, 1519, the Comunidad de villa y tierra de Sepúlveda, a Castilian political institution of medieval origin extended over a large part of the northeast of the province and, at that time, also by some towns in the north of the current provinces of Madrid and Guadalajara, published a series of ordinances that were applied throughout this geographical extension in a mixture of the Castilian of the time and gacería, so this language must have had a palpable recognition in this entire area well into the Modern Age.

In this same century, the presence of the variant in the capital of Segovia is also evident, given that the playwright and actor Lope de Rueda, precursor of the Spanish Golden Age, would incorporate the gacería in his works after his time in Segovia, but without his presence in Cantalejo being recorded.

=== 21st century ===
Municipalities of the province of Segovia affiliated to the Cantalejo public school where gacería is taught as part of the curriculum

Cantalejo is the epicenter of the variant, and it is here where its use is most promoted through initiatives such as bilingual traffic signs, the Trillo Museum or the publication of books in the gazette.

The variant is also known in the surrounding villages, especially those of the Ochavo de Cantalejo - a geographical district of medieval origin - which, headed by Cantalejo, includes San Pedro de Gaíllos, Cabezuela, Fuenterrebollo, Sebúlcor, Aldeonsancho, Valdesimonte, Rebollar, Aldealcorvo, Consuegra de Murera and Villar de Sobrepeña.

Other towns where there are records of speakers of the variant are: Basardilla, where it was introduced by its parish priest in the post-war period after residing in Cantalejo, Veganzones, which is a municipality bordering the Ochavo, and Segovia capital, where a certain already established presence was added to that of emigration from the Brique countryside due to the rural exodus from the second half of the 20th century. A particular case is that of Prádena, not far from the Ochavo, where the existence of an abnormal amount of terminology exclusive to the town, much of it linked to the guild of muleteers, has led to the belief that it is the reminiscences of an ancient and practically extinct vehicular language, perhaps linked to the gacería.

In the overall computation of the province of Segovia there is a slight dispersion of vocabulary and speakers, but it is scarce.

Nowadays the language is taught at the Cantalejo school, which in addition to the children of the city includes those from several nearby towns that do not have their own school and are assigned to this school, these are: Rades de Abajo (Pedraza), La Velilla (Pedraza), Valleruela de Pedraza, Valleruela de Sepúlveda, La Matilla, Aldealcorvo, Rebollar (San Pedro de Gaíllos), Valdesimonte, Muñoveros, Puebla de Pedraza, Rebollo, Navalilla, Valle de Tabladillo, Carrascal de Río, Cobos de Fuentidueña, San Miguel de Bernuy and Fuente el Olmo de Fuentidueña.

== Lexicon ==
The known vocabulary comprises some 353 words (although until the beginning of the 20th century there was talk of the existence of thousands), with pronunciation following the phonetic rules of the Spanish language. The small vocabulary served those who used it, as only a handful of words from the argot were required for specific occasions, without the need for long speeches or paragraphs. Tracing its evolution or performing any lexicographical work is difficult, as Gacería employed words that either changed in meaning or were replaced by new words over time. Most of these 353 known words are nouns; there are some 40 verbs. Some common adjectives include: sierte' ("good, pleasant, pretty"), gazo ("bad," "stupid," "sick," "ugly" from Basque gaizto), pitoche ("small," "scarce," "little"), sievo ("old," "ancient"), quillado ("annoyed," "crazy," "gravely ill"), and urniaco ("dirty").

Some words were formed through the process of metathesis. Thus, the Castilian "criba" is brica in Gacería (whence briquero), "cribo" becomes brico, etc. Other words were formed through aphesis (from "apanar" was derived panar; from "otana," tana). In Gacería, the nouns atrevido and atrevida are used as pronouns to indicate whatever person or thing that currently form the topic of conversation. In Castilian, atrevido carries the meaning of "daring" or "impudent" as an adjective, and "daredevil" or "smart aleck" as a noun.

Gesticulation also plays a large part in giving added meaning to words from Gacería, as one word could potentially have many meanings. "In Gacería eyes speak more than words," one scholar has written. "A simple gesture is enough to change the meaning of a word."

=== Some words from Gacería ===
Gacería	English	Spanish (Castilian)	origin
ante	yesterday	ayer	from Galician onte 'yesterday'
nayuca	pub	taberna	from Galician baiuca 'tavern'
correndeiro	rabbit	conejo	from Galician corredor 'runner'
meca	sheep	oveja	
nícalos	ears	orejas	
sinífaros	Civil Guard	Guardia Civil	from Spanish signíferos 'signifer'
urdaya	meat	carne	from Basque urdaia 'lard'
zuzón sierte	(serrano) ham	jamón	literally, "good bacon"

== See also ==
- Barallete
- Bron
- Cant
- fala dos arxinas
