= Languages of Spain =

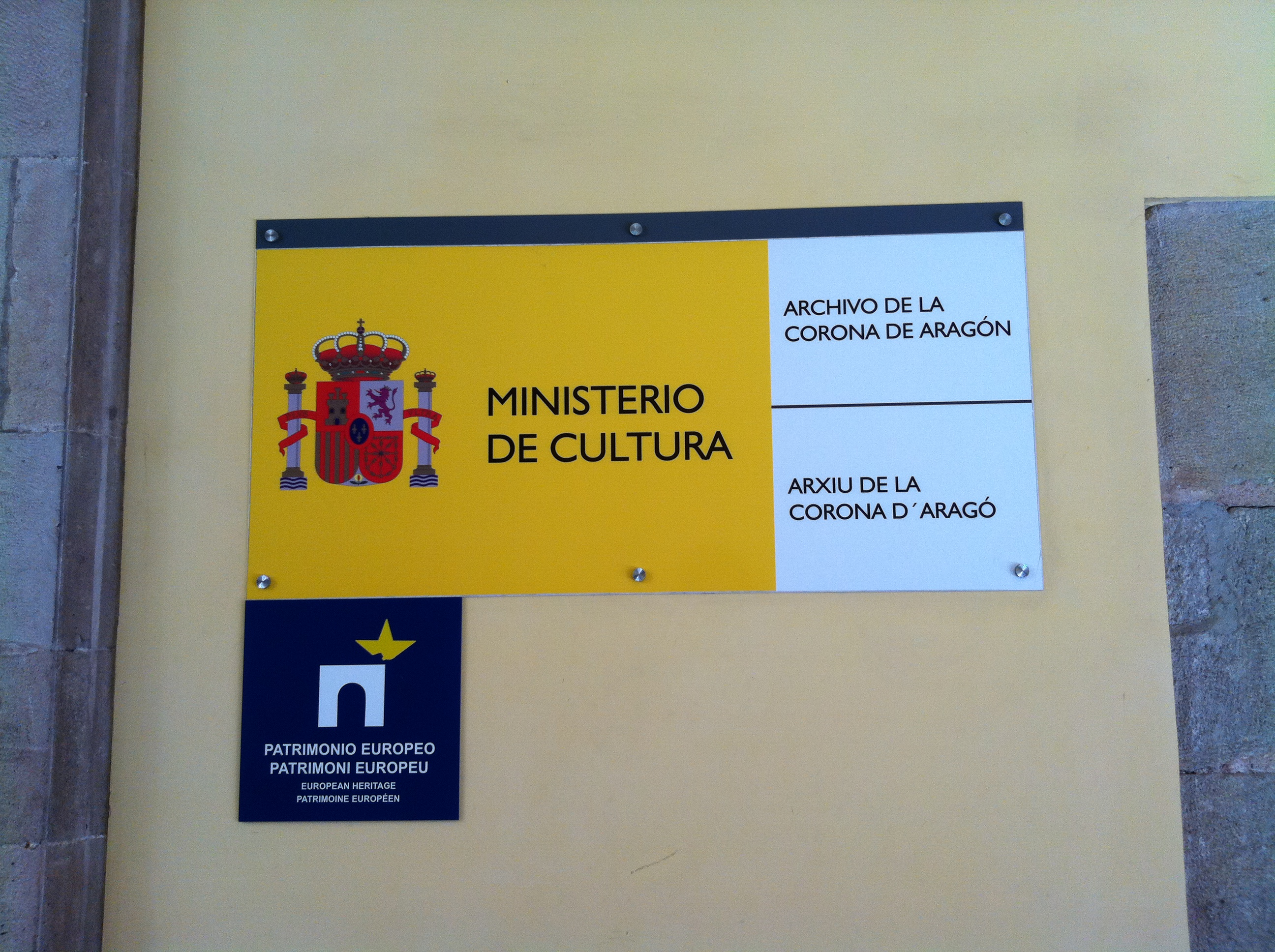
- Bilingual Spanish-Catalan signage at the General Archive of the Crown of Aragon
- Official: Spanish (nationwide); Aranese, Basque, Catalan, Galician and Valencian (Note: Valencian is the official and local name of the Romance language of the Valencian Community, also known as Catalan in other regions of Spain. Sometimes, it is used to refer to either the language as a whole or as a separate language.) (co-official in selected regions)
- Regional: Aragonese, Aranese, Asturian, Basque, Berber (Tarifit), Catalan, Ceuta Arabic, Fala, Galician, Leonese, Portuguese (Oliventine) and Valencian
- Minority: Caló
- Immigrant: Spanish, Portuguese, Moroccan Arabic, Berber, Romanian, Quechua, English, Chinese, Dutch, German, French, Bangla, Bulgarian, Ukrainian, Russian, Wolof, Punjabi, Hindu–Urdu, Wu dialects (Qingtian & Wenzhounese) (see immigration to Spain)
- Signed: Spanish Sign Language; Catalan Sign Language; Valencian Sign Language
- Keyboard layout: QWERTY

The majority of the languages of Spain belong to the Romance language family. The official national language is Spanish (also known as Castilian). In selected autonomous communities, Catalan or Valencian, Galician, Basque and the Aranese standard of Occitan are accorded co-official status alongside Spanish, and Aragonese, Asturian and Leonese (the latter two being variants of Asturleonese) are legally protected but not co-official. Basque is the only language with official status in Spain that is neither Romance nor Indo-European.

The Constitution of Spain regards these languages as "Spanish languages" (Spanish: lenguas españolas).

Spanish is the most widely spoken language, used by approximately 99% of the population as a first or second language. Catalan/Valencian is the first language of 10.5% of the population, followed by Galician at 3.8% and Basque at 1.4%. Immigration has also introduced communities of speakers of various other languages, the most prominent of which being Arabic, Romanian, English, Chinese and Ukrainian.

== Present-day languages ==
Map of native regional languages: Fala, Galician and Portuguese Asturleonese Spanish Aragonese Catalan/Valencian Aranese Basque

Spanish is official nationwide and is spoken by the majority of the population.

Catalan or Valencian is co-official under the name of "Catalan" in Catalonia and the Balearic Islands, and "Valencian" in the Valencian Community. The language is also spoken, although not official, in the eastern strip of Aragon (La Franja) and in the Carche area of the Region of Murcia.

Galician is the majority language of Galicia and is also spoken in adjacent areas of Asturias and Castile and León.

Basque is co-official in the Basque Country and municipalities of northern Navarre as designated by the Foral Law on Basque. It is a language isolate, having no demonstrable relationship with any other languages.

Aranese, a dialect and register of Occitan, is a co-official language of Catalonia. It is spoken in the Val d'Aran in northwest Catalonia.

Aragonese is spoken in the Pyrenean region of northern Aragon. It enjoys legal protection but does not have official status.

Asturleonese, a dialect continuum, has various standards with Asturian and Leonese being granted legal protection. In Asturias, about 25% of the population is reportedly able to understand, speak, read, and write in Asturian. Leonese is spoken in parts of Castile and León (provinces of León and Zamora).

Extremaduran, another Asturleonese language variety, is spoken in Extremadura. Fala, a variety mostly ascribed to the Galician–Portuguese group, is locally spoken in an area of the province of Cáceres (Extremadura) sometimes called the Valley of Jálama/Xálima, which includes the towns of San Martín de Trevejo, Eljas and Valverde del Fresno. Portuguese has been traditionally spoken by the inhabitants of the border towns of Cedillo and Herrera de Alcántara (province of Cáceres), La Alamedilla (province of Salamanca, primarily spoken up until the mid-20th century), and Olivenza (municipality in the province of Badajoz, claimed by Portugal). Extremaduran, Fala and Oliventine Portuguese each have the status of a Bien de Interés Cultural in Extremadura.

Moroccan communities in Ceuta and Melilla speak Ceuta Arabic and Tarifit respectively. Both lack government protection.

Caló, a mixed language, is spoken by the Spanish Romani communities across the country, with a large concentration in Andalusia and Catalonia, though it seems to be in the process of becoming just a dialect of Spanish. It should not be confused with Romani, the Indo-Aryan language originally spoken by the Roma, which is most probably no longer spoken in Spain.

=== Other Romance varieties ===
Spanish itself boasts a substantial internal variation in the country. For example, the Andalusian or Canarian dialects, each with their own subvarieties, some of them being partially closer to Spanish dialects in the Americas, which they heavily influenced to varying degrees, depending on the region or period and according to different and non-homogeneous migrating or colonisation processes. Despite being a dialect, some Andalusian speakers have attempted to promote Andalusian as a different language independent of Spanish.

Five very localised dialects are of difficult filiation: Fala; Cantabrian and Extremaduran, two Astur-Leonese dialects also regarded as Spanish dialects; Eonavian, a dialect between Asturian and Galician, closer to the latter according to several linguists; and Benasquese, a Ribagorçan dialect that was formerly classified as Catalan, later as Aragonese, and which is now often regarded as a transitional language of its own. Asturian and Leonese are closely related to the local Mirandese which is spoken in an adjacent territory on the opposite side of the border, in Portugal. Mirandese is recognised and has some local official status.

Silbo Gomero, a whistled code of Canarian Spanish, is used on the island of La Gomera.

== Statistics ==
Top language spoken at home (Pew Research survey, 2019)
1. Spanish (81.0%)
2. Catalan (8.00%)
3. Valencian (4.00%)
4. Galician (3.00%)
5. Basque (1.00%)

In terms of the number of speakers and dominance, the most prominent of the languages of Spain is Spanish, spoken by about 99% of Spaniards as a first or second language. According to a 2019 Pew Research survey, the most commonly spoken languages at home other than Spanish were Catalan in 8% of households, Valencian in 4%, Galician in 3% and Basque in 1%. A study in 2016 by the University of Navarra focused on which languages were used most frequently to consume news within a week (using multiple-choice surveys). The response included foreign languages, Spanish and only co-official and protected languages. 95.2% consumed news in Spanish and 30.4% in a co-official or protected language. The study reflects that the consumption of protected languages is proportional to their knowledge and that the consumption of foreign-language news is greater than that of regional-language news.

=== 2021 census data ===
First language of those aged two or over, 2021 census
Language	Initial language	
Language	Absolute	Percentage
Spanish	37,650,425	81.53
of which only Spanish	34,477,775	74.66
Catalan (including Valencian and Balearic)	4,846,933	10.50
Galician	1,742,974	3.77
Arabic	1,001,792	2.17
English	730,251	1.58
Romanian	664,407	1.44
Basque	658,030	1.42
French	432,209	0.94
Portuguese	251,497	0.54
Chinese	221,331	0.48
German	205,289	0.44
Italian	188,651	0.41
Bulgarian	152,037	0.33
Russian	147,864	0.32
Ukrainian	76,297	0.17
Polish	61,926	0.13
Berber	59,797	0.13
Dutch	51,672	0.11
Urdu	50,983	0.11
Guarani	36,807	0.08
Wolof	34,581	0.07
Asturian	26,584	0.06
Other languages	347,363	0.75
Total	46,181,637	>100.0

== Language policies ==
Spanish is official throughout the country; Catalan/Valencian, Galician, Basque, and Aranese Occitan have legal and co-official status in their respective communities and (except Aranese Occitan) are widespread enough to have daily newspapers and significant book publishing and media presence. Catalan and Galician are the main languages used by the respective regional governments and local administrations. Starting in 2023, members of the lower house of the Spanish Parliament were allowed to use Basque, Catalan and Galician in their interventions. Members of the upper house already could use those languages in some specific discussions and initiatives.

In addition to these, there are some protected languages. A protected language does not have co-official status but can be taught in schools as an optional subject, with the possibility of having TV shows in the protected language as well as institutions for that language.

Limited Asturian-language content is available on RTPA, and the language is learned as an optional subject by 53% of primary education students. There is a prominent movement demanding for the declaration of Asturian as an official language in Asturias, which is a matter of an ongoing political debate. Aragonese is offered as a subject in about 30 schools in Aragon, with around 1,300 students as of 2023. Limited Aragonese-language television content has been broadcast by Aragón TV, with shows such as A Escampar la Boira or Charrín Charrán. Limited content in Tarifit has also been broadcast by Televisión Melilla.

Regarding education, the models vary considerably. Some schools in Catalonia and the Balearic Islands guarantee the possibility of an education entirely in the regional language, but most of the schools apply bilingual education with more weight of Catalan. In Galicia, the Galician language is prohibited in certain subjects by law, restricted to a maximum of one-third of education and absent in 92% of the first education of Galician students. In the Valencian Community the existence of Catalan-speaking areas and Spanish-speaking areas generates debates about the presence of the language in education, proposing an equal presence of Valencian (Catalan) and Spanish, which does not conform to any of the linguistic parts.

As for non-official languages, Asturian can be studied as an optional subject in both primary school and high school, a policy that has been in place since 1984. Aragonese is de facto not taught due to the lack of teachers, even though there is demand for it in many schools. Leonese, Extremaduran and Fala are totally excluded from regional education, as is Galician in the outer Galician-speaking territories.

== Historical languages ==
Alongside the languages spoken in Spain to the present day, other languages used to be widely spoken within its present-day borders:

Distribution (assumed) of languages in the Iberian peninsula between 1000~2000 C.E.

- Tartessian
- Iberian
- Celtic languages
  - Celtiberian
  - Callaecian
- Lusitanian
- Punic
- Guanche
- Germanic languages
  - Gothic
  - Vandalic
  - Frankish
- Arabic
  - Andalusi Arabic
  - Classical Arabic
  - Judeo-Arabic
- Andalusi Romance (Mozarabic)
- Judaeo-Spanish (Ladino)
- Judaeo-Catalan (the existence of a Jewish-Catalan variety distinct from the Catalan used by Christians has been questioned)
- Romani

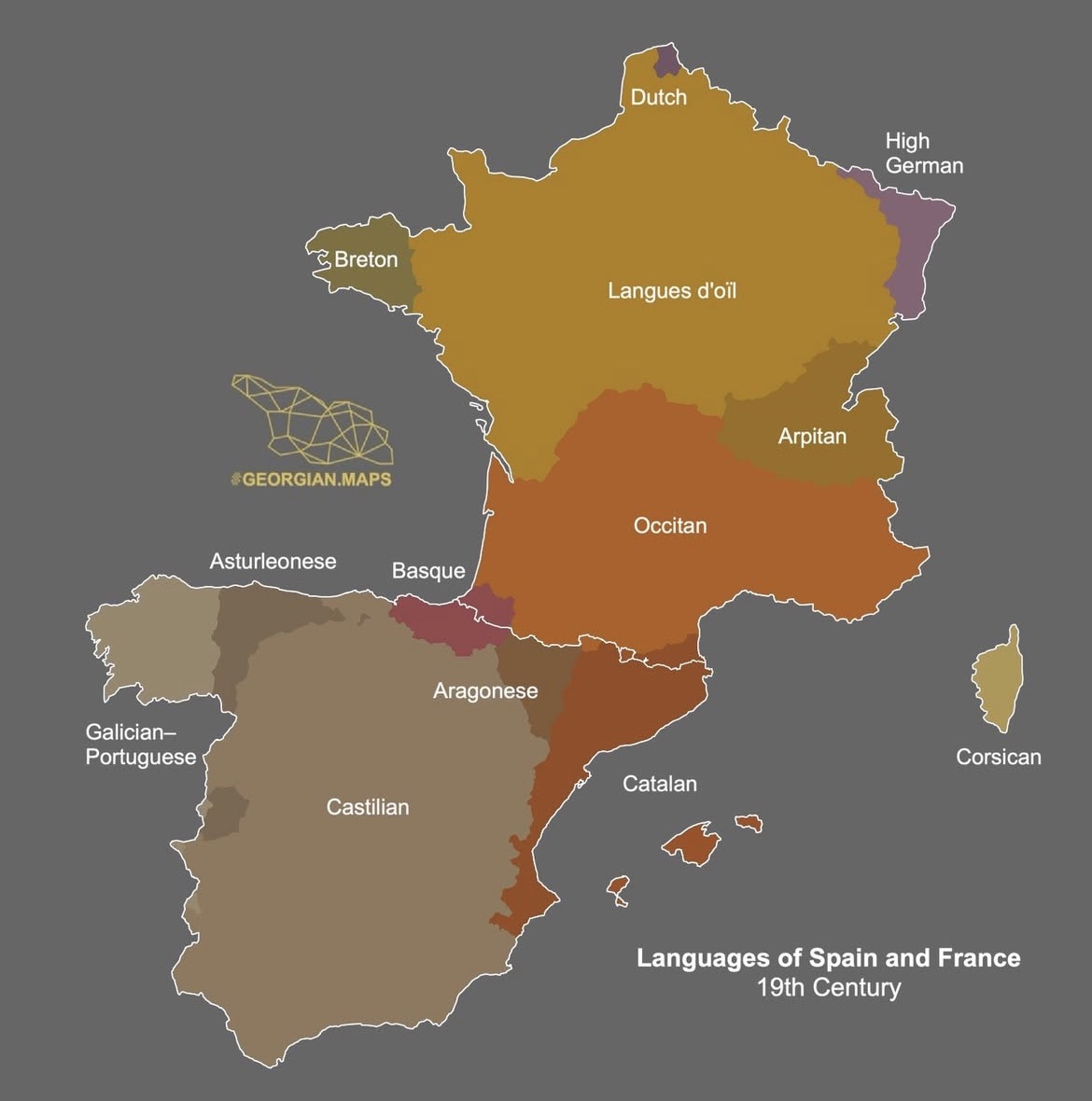
Languages of Spain and France in the 19th century

== Variants ==
There are also variants of these languages proper to Spain, either dialects, cants or pidgins:

- Barallete
- Bron
- Caló
- Cheli
- Erromintxela
- Fala dos arxinas
- Gacería
- Germanía
- Xíriga

== See also ==
- Iberian languages
- Languages of Portugal
- Iberian Romance languages
- Language policies of Francoist Spain
