= Deafness in Spain =

Spain has an official population of just over 1 million people that are Deaf or hard of hearing (2.3% of the total population), although some surveys have said that as much as 10% of people in Spain report some form of hearing loss. Spain has a signing population of roughly 100,000 across three sign languages. One in four people with hearing loss report using a hearing aid such as a cochlear implant.

== Human and civil rights ==
Spain signed the Convention on the Rights of Persons with Disabilities (CRPD), as well as the optional protocols, on 30 March 2007. Both articles were later ratified on 3 December 2007. The World Federation of the Deaf highlights articles 2, 9, 21, 24, and 30 as important to Deaf people, which pertain to the definition of disability and the rights to accessibility, education, participation in culture. Many rights, among which were the rights to be educated in a sign language and the right to be able to communicate in that sign language, were guaranteed for deaf and deafblind people on 27 October 2007 alongside explicit recognition of the Spanish and Catalan sign languages. The CNSE, a state-run nonprofit in Spain, has also been a member of the European Union of the Deaf since its founding in 1985. The EUD noted that Spain stood out as having good practices when surveying the implementation of the European Accessibilities Act.

In the "List of issues prior to the submission" submitted to the CRPD, a few of the concerns shared by the people of Spain in regards to their following of the CRPD that would pertain to the DHH community include:

- Concern about people with disabilities access to public services, such as healthcare and education.
- Concern about the inclusion and accessibility of procedures in situations of risk and humanitarian emergencies
- Concern on the enforcement of the support of sign languages described in the 2007 law

== Sign languages ==
Spain has 3 legally recognized sign languages; Spanish Sign Language (LSE), Catalan Sign Language (LSC), and Valencian Sign Language (LSV). All three are classified as Deaf-community signing languages. LSE and LSC were officially recognized in 2007 by the country of Spain, and LSC was recognized by the Valencian Community in 2006 but is not explicitly recognized by the country as a whole. As of 2019, there are a total of 100,000 users (10% of Spain's total population of Deaf and hard of hearing) across all three languages, with 60,000 users of LSE, 25,000 of LSC, and 6,000 of LSV.

According to the EUD, Spain has 150 deaf sign language users for every 1 interpreter.

== Newborn screening and early intervention ==
Newborn hearing screenings were made mandatory in 2003. As of 2012, greater than 95% of newborns are screened for deafness, 50% with automatic auditory brainstem response (AABR) and 50% with both otoacoustic emission (OAE) and AABR, however each autonomous community within Spain performs their screening and intervention differently so it is inaccurate to make broad claims. In Madrid, most deaf children receive a cochlear implant.

== Education ==
The first recorded teaching of deaf children is in the mid 16th century by Pedro Ponce de Leon, a Spanish monk who tutored the deaf children of rich aristocrats on speaking and writing. The first state-sponsored school for the deaf opened in 1805. The 1857 Moyano Law, a law that organized Spanish education, mandated that teachers learn how to teach deaf and blind students and that schools for the deaf be established where they weren't available, however the former mandate was overwritten in a later law. The education of the deaf at the time mostly involved signing and fingerspelling but was switched to focusing on oralism after the 1880 Congress of Milan.

A 1970 law emphasized integration and limited enrollment in special schools to people with profound disabilities, causing many deaf children to be moved to classrooms with hearing teachers. The push for integration was reinforced in a law implemented in 1985, which allowed any child with a disability to go to a mainstream school if they wished and required schools to accommodate the student instead of treating them like a problem. However, these accommodations did not often include sign language due to schools still operating under an oralist doctrine and would not train teachers on deafness until 1991, leading to a low rate of graduation for deaf children.

In 1994, Spain hosted the World Conference on Special Needs Education: Access and Quality which, among other things, addressed the poor quality of education that results from deaf children being deprived of sign language. Shortly after, Spain issued Royal Decrees encouraging use of sign language in school and training for teachers in sign language and establishing the requirements for doing so. Rights for deaf and deafblind children to attend school as well as the right to learn Spanish Sign Language while in school was guaranteed in 2007, both in the signed and ratified UNCRPD and Law 27/2007. As of 2018, 82% of Deaf children attend mainstream schools alongside hearing children.

Literacy rates among deaf people in Spain are low compared to their hearing counterparts, although deafness itself is not a predictive factor for literacy. The literacy rate of deaf people across the world is less than 25%, and both Spanish students in general have a lower reading level than similar countries.
