= Signed Spanish =

Manually coded forms of Spanish

Signed Spanish and Signed Exact Spanish are any of several manually coded forms of Spanish that apply the words (signs) of a national sign language to Spanish word order or grammar. In Mexico, Signed Spanish uses the signs of Mexican Sign Language; in Spain, it uses the signs of Spanish Sign Language, and there is a parallel Signed Catalan that uses the signs of Catalan Sign Language along with oral Catalan. Signed Spanish is used in education and for simultaneous translation, not as a natural form of communication among deaf people. The difference between Signed Spanish and Signed Exact Spanish is that while Signed Spanish uses the signs (but not the grammar) of Spanish Sign Language, and augments them with signs for Spanish suffixes such as -dor and -ción, and with fingerspelling for articles and pronouns, Signed Exact Spanish (and Signed Exact Catalan) has additional signs for the many grammatical inflections of oral Spanish. All signed forms of Spanish drop the grammatical inflections of the sign languages they take their vocabulary from.

== See also ==
- Signed English and Signed Exact English
