= Official languages of Spain =

Native languages in autonomous communities with co-official languages
Autonomous community	Co-official language	Spanish	Co-official language	Equal use	Others
Catalonia	Catalan and Aranese Occitan	55.1%	31.0%	2.4%	10.1%
Valencia	Valencian (variety of Catalan)	60.8%	28.8%	9.5%	0.8%
Galicia	Galician	30.9%	40.9%	25.3%	2.9%
Basque Country	Basque	76.4%	17.5%	6.0%	n/d
Balearic Islands	Catalan	48.6%	37.9%	3.6%	9.9%
Navarre	Basque	91.9%	6.1%	2.8%	n/d

The official languages of Spain are many. Spanish, the official language of Spain, is the predominant native language in almost all of the autonomous communities in Spain. Six of the seventeen autonomous communities in Spain have other co-official languages in addition to Spanish. Bilingualism in different degrees and in distinct communicative situations between Spanish and another language is a habitual practice for many of the Spanish people who reside in one of these autonomous communities.

According to the Survey of the Involvement of the Adult Population in Learning Activities distributed by the National Institute of Statistics with data from 2016, in regards to the languages in Spain that are native languages or languages that are not native but used, 98.9% of the population speaks Spanish, 17.5% speaks Catalan (not including Valencian), 6.2% speaks Galician, 5.8% speaks Valencian (a variety of Catalan) and 3.0% speaks Basque. For autonomous communities, Catalan can be used by almost 85% of the population of Catalonia and 63.1% of the Balearic region, Galician is used by 89% of Galicians, Valencian is used by 51.8% of the residents in that community and Basque is spoken by 55.1% of the Basque population and 21.7% of people in Navarre. With regard to native languages alone, Galician is the native language of 82.8% of Galicians, Catalan is the native language of 31.6% of people in Catalonia and of 42.9% of the residents in the Balearic region. Valencian (a variety of Catalan) is the native language of 35.2% of the population in that community and Basque is the native language of 33.7% of the Basque people and of 14.6% of those from Navarre.

With the exception of Basque, which is a language isolate, all of the vernacular languages spoken now in Spain are Romance languages, within the family of the Indo-European languages. The majority belong to the sub-group of languages Iberian Romance, with the exception of Catalan/Valencian and Aranese, belonging to the Occitano-Romances and Aragonese. Affiliation between one subgroup or the other is a cause for active discussion.

== Spanish ==
Spanish (sometimes called Castilian) is the only official language of the entire country and is spoken habitually and as a native language among a vast majority of the Spanish population. Spain is, along with Colombia and after Mexico and the United States, ranked third in the world as the country with the most Spanish speakers.

Spanish is the only official language in Asturias, Cantabria, La Rioja, Aragon, Castile and León, Madrid, Castilla-La Mancha, Extremadura, Andalusia, the Canary Islands and the region of Murcia, as well as Ceuta, Melilla, and half of Navarre.

It is also co-official with other languages in Catalonia, Balearic Islands, the Valencian Community, Galicia, Basque Country and the Basque zone of Navarre. In all of the bilingual autonomous communities, with the exception of Galicia, Spanish is actually the native language of the majority of the population, although this is due in large part to the internal migration processes that occurred in Spain from the middle of the 20th century.

The predominance of Spanish started in the Middle Ages with the Reconquista, expanding throughout the Kingdom of Castile (in which the language was born) and later to other areas in the Iberian peninsula; it had cultural prestige and was also spoken in part of the Kingdom of Aragon and of the Kingdom of Navarre. It gained importance in becoming an auxiliary language, along with commercial and diplomatic communication, in the 16th and 17th centuries. In the following centuries Spanish continued its expansion at the expense of the languages bordering with it; this is shown clearly in the case of the Leonese and Aragonese languages, and also in the case of Basque. During the second half of the 20th century, Francoism drove the regional languages away from public use and favored the use of Spanish; the internal migrations happening around the same time contributed to the predominance of Spanish too. This situation was reverted with the arrival of democracy in Spain and especially with the passing of the Constitution of 1978 which recognized the co-official status of the regional languages in their respective territories; from then on the bilingual autonomous communities began several different policies to normalize the use of their languages, a situation that had special success in the field of education.

== Co-official languages ==
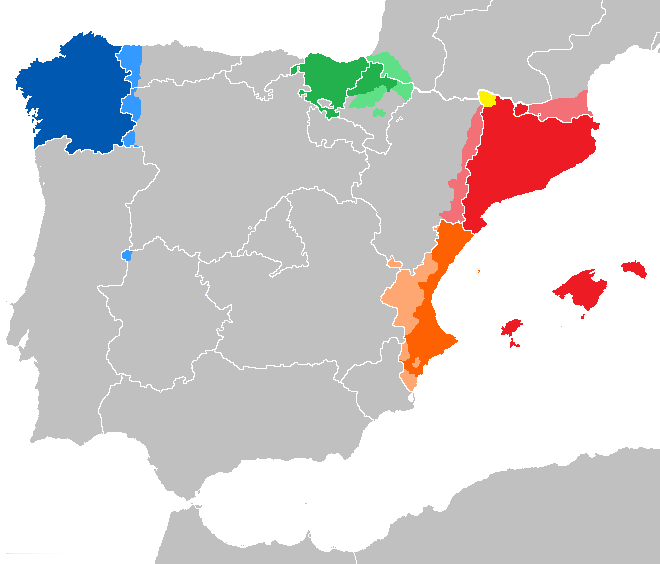
Co-official languages in Spain

The autonomous communities have established the following official languages in their respective territories: Catalan/Valencian in Catalonia (as Catalan), the Balearic Islands (as Catalan) and the Valencian Community (as Valencian), Galician in Galicia, Basque in the Basque Country and a part of Navarre, and Occitan in the form of Aranese in the Aran Valley of Catalonia.

=== Catalan/Valencian ===
The Catalan/Valencian language is recognised as an official language in Catalonia, the Balearic Islands and the Valencian Community along with Spanish; in Aragon the Statute of Autonomy defines the language, along with Aragonese, as "one of the manifestations that most stand out of Aragonese history and culture and a social value of respect, coexistence, and understanding". In the Valencian Community the official name for the language is Valencian, while in the other territories the official name is Catalan.

- In Catalonia, Catalan has two main varieties: Central Catalan, which is spoken in the provinces of Barcelona and Girona and in the eastern half of Tarragona, and Northwestern Catalan, which is spoken in the province of Lleida and the western half of the province of Tarragona. In Catalonia, Spanish is the native language of the majority of the population (55%), Catalan is the native language of 31.6%, and 3.8% consider both as their native language, according to a study done in 2008 by the government of Catalonia. Spanish is predominant in urban zones, especially in the metropolitan region of Barcelona and in the metropolitan area of Tarragona (76% of the Catalan population lives in those two areas), whereas Catalan is predominant in the rest of the autonomous community. Most Spanish speakers either were born elesewhere in Spain or have parents born elsewhere.
- Catalan spoken in the Balearic Islands, or Balearic Catalan, is a variety of eastern Catalan that presents some features that are very different from Peninsular Catalan, such as the replacement of the articles el/la by es/sa. In the Balearic Islands, Spanish is the native language of 47.7% of the population (most of them born elsewhere in Spain), Catalan of 42.6%, and 1.8% claim both languages as native, according to a survey done in 2003 by the Balearic government. Spanish is the predominant language in the metropolitan area of Palma de Mallorca and in Ibiza, while Catalan is predominant in Menorca and in the rural areas of Mallorca.
- In the Valencian Community, Valencian is a western variety of the Catalan/Valencian language spoken in this autonomous community. During the 20th century, different opinions about whether Valencian should be considered a language of its own or the same language as Catalan led to the Valencian linguistic conflict. There are two linguistic zones in the community: one monolingual with Spanish (accounting for 25% of the landmass and 13% of the population) and one bilingual between Spanish and Valencian (75% of the area, 87% of the population). In the bilingual zone, Spanish is the language spoken at home as a preferred form by 54.5% of the population, while Valencian is preferred by 36.4% and 6.2% use both languages, according to a study performed in 2003 by the Valencian government. Spanish is predominant in the metropolitan area of Valencia, the metropolitan area of Alicante-Elche and in the metropolitan area of Castellón de la Plana, while Valencian is predominant in the northern part of the province of Alicante, the south of Valencia province, and most of the province of Castellón. As in the case of Catalonia and the Balearic islands, many Spanish speakers have family origins elsewhere in Spain.

Additionally, within Spain Catalan/Valencian is also spoken, though not official, in the easternmost part of Aragon, known as La Franja (where it is called Catalan) and in the region of El Carche in the northeastern region of Murcia (where it is called Valencian).

In total, Catalan/Valencian is the language spoken at home by approximately 4,452,000 Spanish citizens.

=== Galician ===
Galician is co-official in Galicia (Spanish Constitution of 1978 article 3.2 and Statute of Autonomy of Galicia article 5). It also has "respect and protection" in Castile and León, according to article 5.3 of the Organic Law 14/2007, of 30 November, from the reform of the Statute of Autonomy of Castile and León; Galician is spoken in a northwestern corner of that community. Galician belongs, along with Spanish, to the group of Iberian Romance languages, and is closely related to Portuguese, with which it formed linguistic unity (Galician-Portuguese) during the Middle Ages. In fact, according to some Galician and Portuguese authors, they should still be considered a single language today despite the differences that have appeared since the Middle Ages (see Reintegrationism). Galician has three main dialectal areas: western, central, and eastern; those are subdivided into other areas. In addition to Galicia, Galician is spoken in western Asturias and in the westernmost area of the provinces of Leon and Zamora. The Fala of the Valley of Jalama in northwestern Extremadura is related to Portuguese and also to Galician.

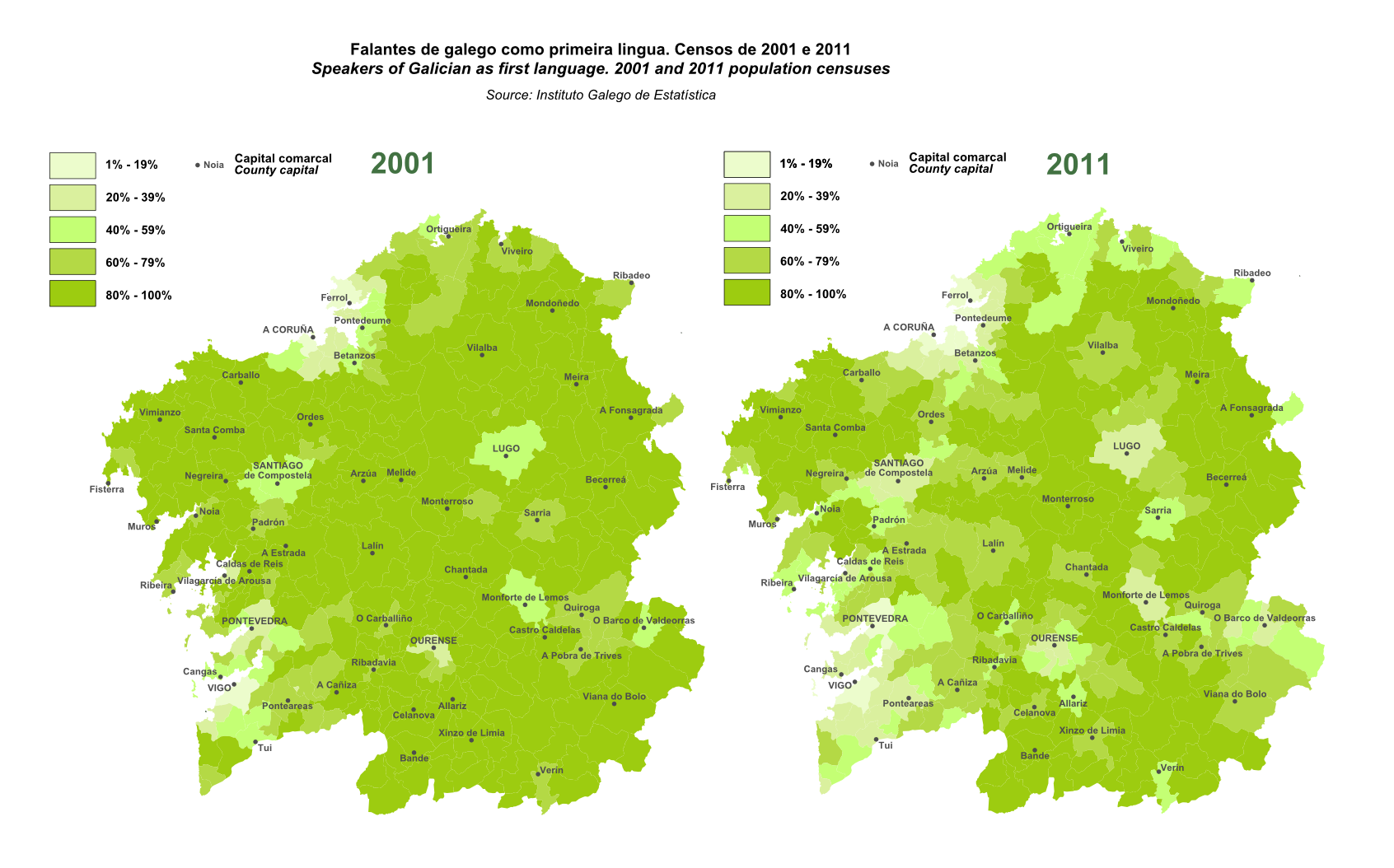
Percentage of Galician speakers (corrected)

In Galicia, Galician is the native language of 40.9% of the population, 30.9% claim Spanish as their native language, and 25.3% have both languages as native; 50.8% of the population habitually use more Galician than Spanish, while 47.8% habitually use Spanish.

As in other autonomous communities, Spanish is the language that is spoken most in urban areas of Galicia, while Galician is spoken in rural areas. In total, Galician is the language spoken at home by approximately 1,302,000 people. Another 563,000 speak Galician interchangeably with Spanish. Unlike in Catalonia, the Valencian Community and the Balearic Islands, in Galicia the main cause of the advance of Spanish over the local language (Galician) is not immigration, but language shift.

=== Basque ===
Basque is a co-official language with Spanish in the Basque Country and in the northern third of the Foral Community in Navarre. There are six main Basque dialects and a standard variety, Standard Basque.

- In the Basque Country, Basque is the official language in the entire territory. In almost the entire province of Alava and in the western zone of the province of Vizcaya the language hasn't been spoken for several centuries, the population of this areas is Spanish-speaking (66% of the population of Alava in 2011). The varieties of Basque spoken are: Biscayan in Vizcaya, north of Alava and in the west of Guipúzcoa; Gipuzcoan in most of Guipúzcoa; and Basque-Navarrese in the east of Guipúzcoa. The data from the sociolinguistic census in 2011 done by the Basque government showed that 32% of the population older than 16 years old spoke Basque bilingually (600,050 speakers), 17.2% were passive bilingual speakers (322,000) and 50.8% only spoke Spanish (951,000).
- In Navarre, Basque is co-official in the area called Basque-speaking zone, in the northeast of the community; the main dialect there is Upper Navarrese. To the south and the east of this zone, other municipalities form the Mixed Zone (where the use of Basque is promoted). Finally, the southern half of the territory is the Non-Basque-speaking area, historically of Romance language (Navarroaragones in the Middle Ages, and later Spanish). In total in Navarre, the last sociolinguistic study from the Navarre Institute for the Basque Language done in 2008 indicated that together with the population of Navarre the percentage of Basque speakers was 11.9% (additionally 6.2% of the population that didn't speak Basque well but had some knowledge), compared of 81.9% of Navarros that exclusively spoke Spanish.

Basque is spoken altogether by almost one million Spanish citizens (2.15% of the population).

=== Aranese Occitan ===
Aranese, a variety of the Occitan language spoken in the Aran Valley, in the northwest of Lleida province, is official in this valley and from 2006 in all of Catalonia following the new Statute of Autonomy. In the Aran Valley, Spanish is the native language of 38.8% of the population (many of them born elsewhere), Occitan in the form of Aranese is the native language of 34.2% and Catalan of 19.4%, according to the data from the census in 2001. Aranese is the native language of about 2,800 people, representing 0.007% of the population of Spain.

== Protected languages ==
In addition to the official languages, some languages in Spain enjoy status as "protected languages." In contrast to the co-official languages, a protected language

- is protected and promoted by the government;
- can appear in autonomous TV/radio with shows entirely in the protected language;
- can be taught as an elective subject in schools.

While protected languages may be available as electives, they are not required in any schools, as are the co-official languages. Additionally, protected languages are not used as the vehicular language in any region. The status of protected languages is often debated, and as of May 2023, there are movements to promote Aragonese and Asturian from protected to co-official status.

=== Aragonese ===
Aragonese is a romance language spoken by 25,556 native speakers (56,235 including passive speakers) according to a 2011 study.

As of 2023, Aragonese is offered as a subject in about 30 schools of the Aragon region, with around 1,300 students. Limited Aragonese-language television content is available on the regional public broadcaster, with shows such as A Escampar la Boira or Charrín Charrán. Aragonese is protected by the government of Aragon

=== Asturian ===
Asturian language is spoken by 100,000 native speakers (400,000 including passive speakers) in the region of Asturias.

Limited Asturian-language broadcasting is available on RTPA, and the language is learned as an optional subject by a 53% of primary education students. There is a prominent movement demanding for the declaration of Asturian as an official language in Asturias, which is a matter of an ongoing political debate. At this moment Asturian is a protected language, but could be co-official soon.

=== Leonese ===
The Astur-leonese variant known as leonese is spoken in the Castile and Leon region, where it has protection.
