= Basardilla =

Basardilla Vasardilla
- Municipality
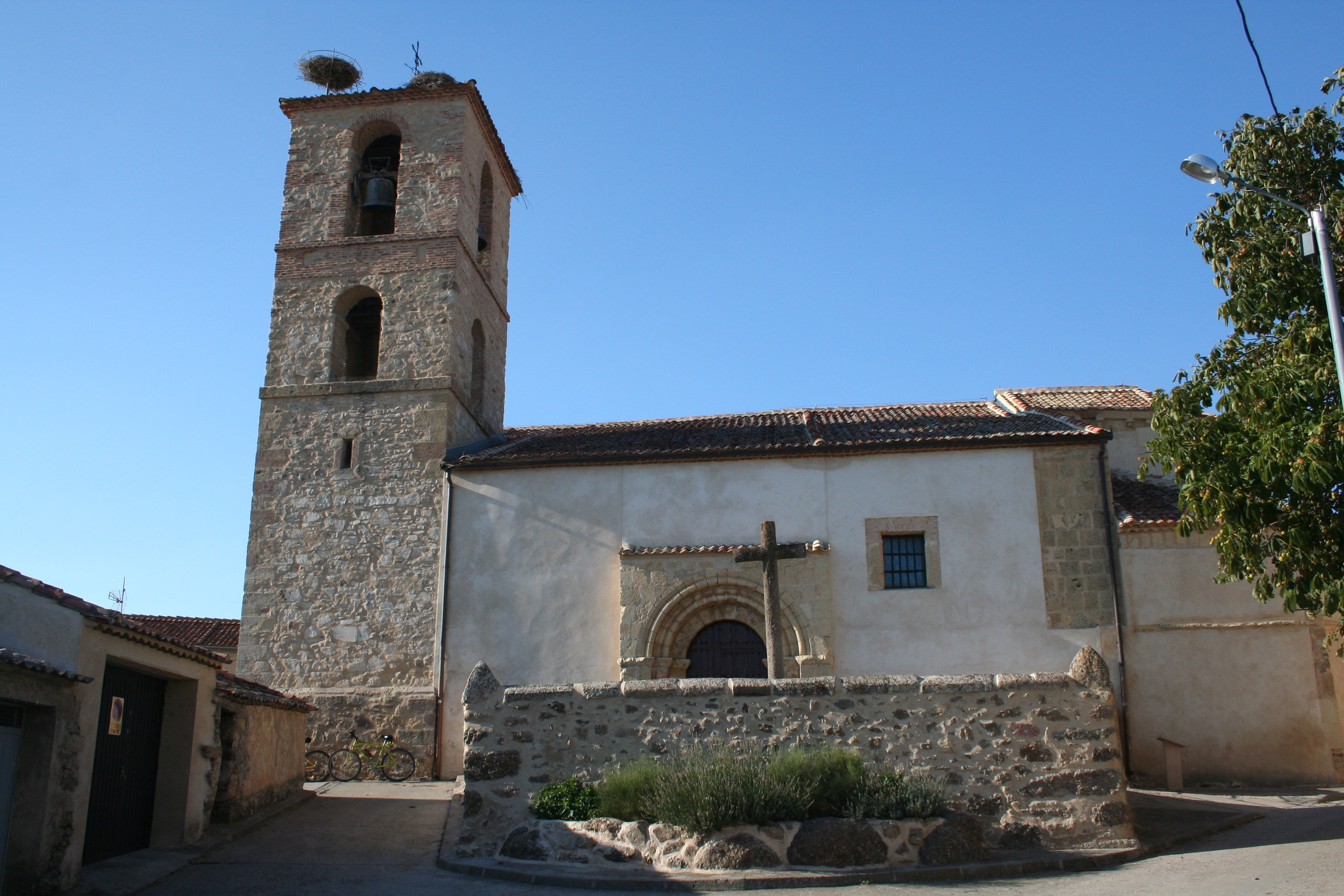
- Parish Church of San Bartolomé in Basardilla, Segovia, Spain

- Location in Spain. Basardilla (Spain)
- Coordinates: 41°01′38″N 4°01′29″W
- Country: Spain
- Autonomous community: Castile and León
- Province: Segovia
- Municipality: Basardilla

Area
  - Total: 19.02 km^{2} (7.34 sq mi)
- Elevation: 1,010 m (3,310 ft)

Population (2025-01-01)
  - Total: 136
  - Density: 7.15/km^{2} (18.5/sq mi)
- Time zone: UTC+1 (CET)
  - Summer (DST): UTC+2 (CEST)
- Website: Official website

Basardilla (historically and in gacería, Vasardilla) is a municipality located in the province of Segovia, Castile and León, Spain. The town's name has a Roman origin and means "Zarza Valley". It is located between Torrecaballeros and Brieva at an altitude of 1010 meters. According to the 2004 census (INE), the municipality had a population of 149 inhabitants.
