= Xíriga =

Cant used by tile workers from Asturias, Spain

Xíriga is an occupation-related cant on Asturian developed by the tejeros of Llanes and Ribadesella in Asturias. The tejeros were migrant workers in brick or clay, usually poor, who contracted themselves out for work sometimes in distant towns. Often mistreated by their overseers, the traveling craftsmen developed xíriga sometime around the 18th century as a defensive or private language in order to be able to talk freely in front of their employers/masters. Because it originated with poor working men who were largely illiterate, xíriga had no written form, and the language began to disappear with the decline of the tejeros although one can still hear it spoken occasionally by relatives or descendants.

The words created for or adopted into the language provide some insight into the social life, customs and beliefs of its original speakers—for example, there are a large number of verbs that translate "to rob" and many of the words are crude, blunt, or intended as insults.

As in the Gacería of the makers of threshing-boards and sieves in Cantalejo, Segovia and the Galician Fala dos arxinas, some of the words are taken from Basque language. While the Basque regions were far from the tejero routes, the non-Romance vocabulary of Basque makes it unintelligible to outsiders.

== Examples ==
araguía
meat. Haragia is Basque for "the meat"
asúa
fire. Sua is Basque for "the fire".
bai
yes. Bai is Basque for "yes"
bartolo
corn. Arto is Basque for corn. "Bartolo" is also a Spanish nickname for Bartholomew.
drama
mother. A vesre of madre
drape
father. A metathesis of padre.
ergue, erguín
stonecutter. Hargin is Basque for "stonecutter", arxina in fala dos arxinas.
