= Mexican Sign Language =

Language of deaf community in Mexico

Mexican Sign Language (LSM)
- Lengua de Señas Mexicana (LSM)
- Native to: Mexico
- Region: Cities
- Native speakers: 130,000 (2010 projection)
- Language family: French Sign: Mexican Sign Language (LSM)

Language codes
- ISO 639-3: mfs
- Glottolog: mexi1237
- ELP: Mexican Sign Language
- Map of the North American Francosign languages, featuring Mexican Sign Language (labelled as "LSM")

Video to promote better access to museums for disabled people with Mexican sign language

Mexican Sign Language (Spanish: Lengua de señas mexicana, LSM; also previously known by several other names) is the predominant language of the Deaf community in Mexico. LSM is a complete and organized visual language, which is expressed with the hands, face, and body, with its own distinct history, community, and culture. There are several dialects based on regional variation and LSM may be learned as a second language by hearing and Deaf signers. LSM is closely related to French Sign Language (LSF) and American Sign Language (ASL), although it is not mutually intelligible with either.

LSM originated in the mid-19th century following the establishment of the first school for the Deaf in Mexico City, Escuela Nacional de Sordomudos (ENS), in 1869. Deaf students at the school were instructed by educators using Old French Sign Language, but also brought with them their own home signs and signing systems, which led to the formation of LSM.

The number of native LSM signers is estimated to be between 49,000 and 195,000 people. LSM is classified as vulnerable.

== Geographic distribution and variation ==
Core signing populations are found in Mexico City, Guadalajara and Monterrey, with a number of smaller cities containing signing communities. There is also a growing number of LSM signers in the United States, particularly in areas along the Mexico–United States border and in Washington, D.C., due to educational and economic opportunities. Some members of the Deaf Latino community in the United States also use LSM.

Some regional variation is found (80–90% lexical similarity across the country according to Faurot et al. 2001) and there is lexical variation based on age and gender in the numeral system.

== Relationship of LSM to Spanish ==
Public service announcement with Mexican Sign Language interpretation

LSM is quite distinct from Spanish, with completely different verb inflections, different discourse structure and preferences for word order, and little use of the verb to be. However, there is extensive use of initialised signs with one study finding 37% of a 100-word list are initialised, compared to 14% for American Sign Language (Faurot et al. 2001). The same authors suggest that the Deaf community's comprehension of the Spanish language is very low.

The term "Signed Spanish" refers to signing that uses LSM signs (lexicon) in a Spanish word order, with some representations of Spanish morphology. There is a group of suffixes that signed Spanish uses in a way similar to that of signed English, e.g. signed symbols for -dor and -ción (for nouns). Articles and pronouns are fingerspelled. Signed Spanish (or Pidgin Signed Spanish) is often used by interpreters and during public reading or song-leading. Signed Spanish is also used by some hard of hearing and late deafened people.

== Relationship to other sign languages ==
LSM is widely believed by the Deaf community to have derived from Old French Sign Language (OFSL), which combined with pre-existing local sign languages and home sign systems when Deaf schools were first established in 1869. However, it is mutually unintelligible with American Sign Language, which emerged from OFSL 50 years earlier in the US, although the American manual alphabet is almost identical to the Mexican one. Spanish Sign Language used in Spain is different from Mexican Sign Language, though LSM may have been influenced by it.

== Status ==
In 2005, Mexican Sign Language was officially declared a national language in Mexico, along with Spanish and indigenous languages, to be used in the national education system for the Deaf. Before 2005, the major educational philosophy in the country focused on oralism (speech and lipreading) and with few schools that conducted classes in LSM.

A five-minute signed segment of a nightly television news program was broadcast in Signed Spanish in the mid-1980s, then again in the early 1990s, discontinued in 1992, and resumed as a 2-minute summary of headlines in 1997.

== See also ==
- Mayan sign languages
