= Muñoveros =

- Municipality
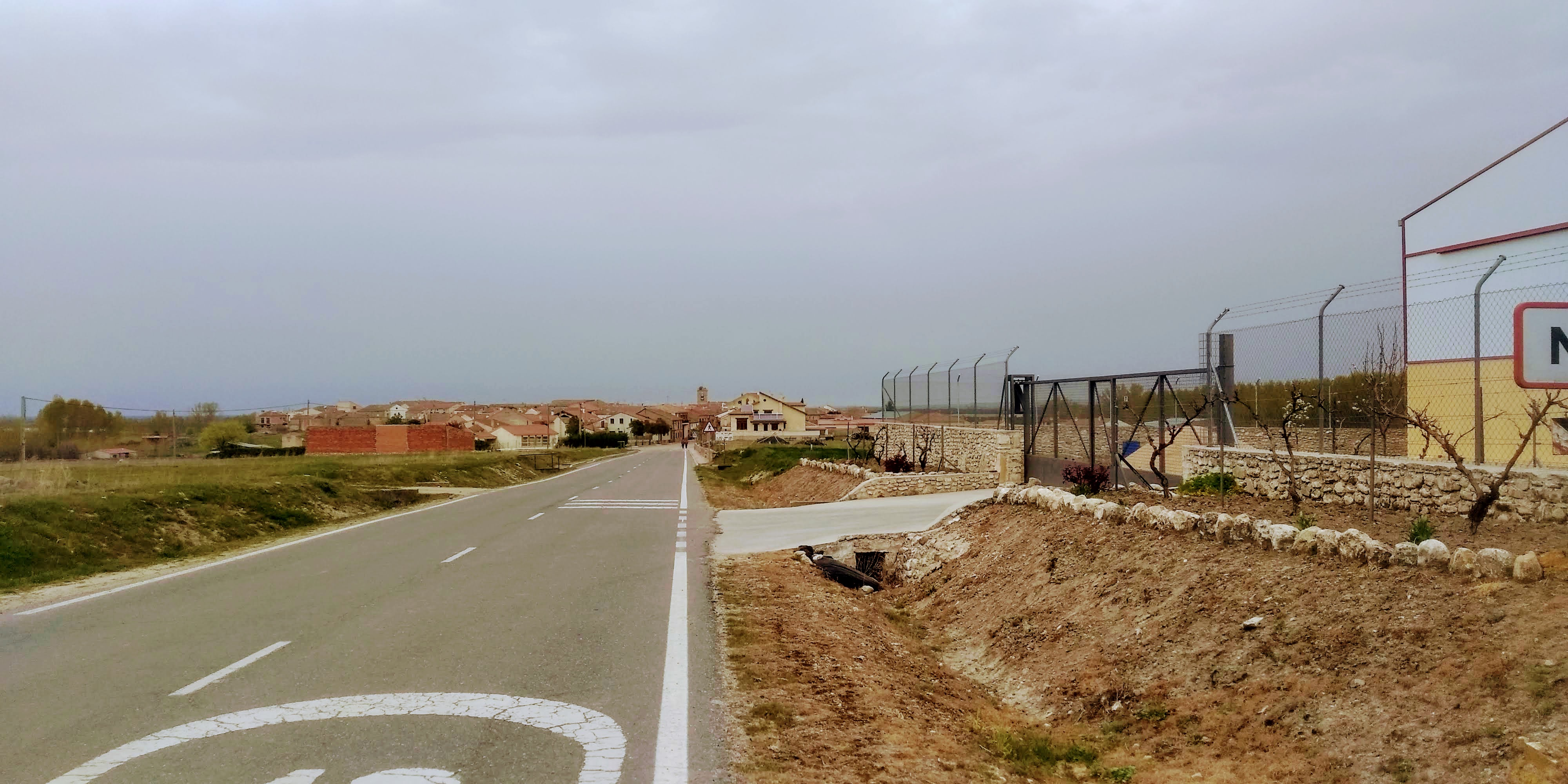
- Entrance to Muñoveros from the road that connects the municipality with Caballar

- Flag Coat of arms

- Location in Spain. Muñoveros (Spain)
- Coordinates: 41°10′20″N 3°57′06″W
- Country: Spain
- Autonomous community: Castile and León
- Province: Segovia
- Municipality: Muñoveros

Area
  - Total: 19 km^{2} (7.3 sq mi)

Population (2025-01-01)
  - Total: 138
  - Density: 7.3/km^{2} (19/sq mi)
- Time zone: UTC+1 (CET)
  - Summer (DST): UTC+2 (CEST)
- Website: Official website

Muñoveros is a municipality located in the province of Segovia, Castile and León, Spain. According to the 2022 census (INE), the municipality has a population of 127 inhabitants.

According to legend the tomb of Juan Bravo can be found in the church.
