= Valle de Tabladillo =

- Municipality
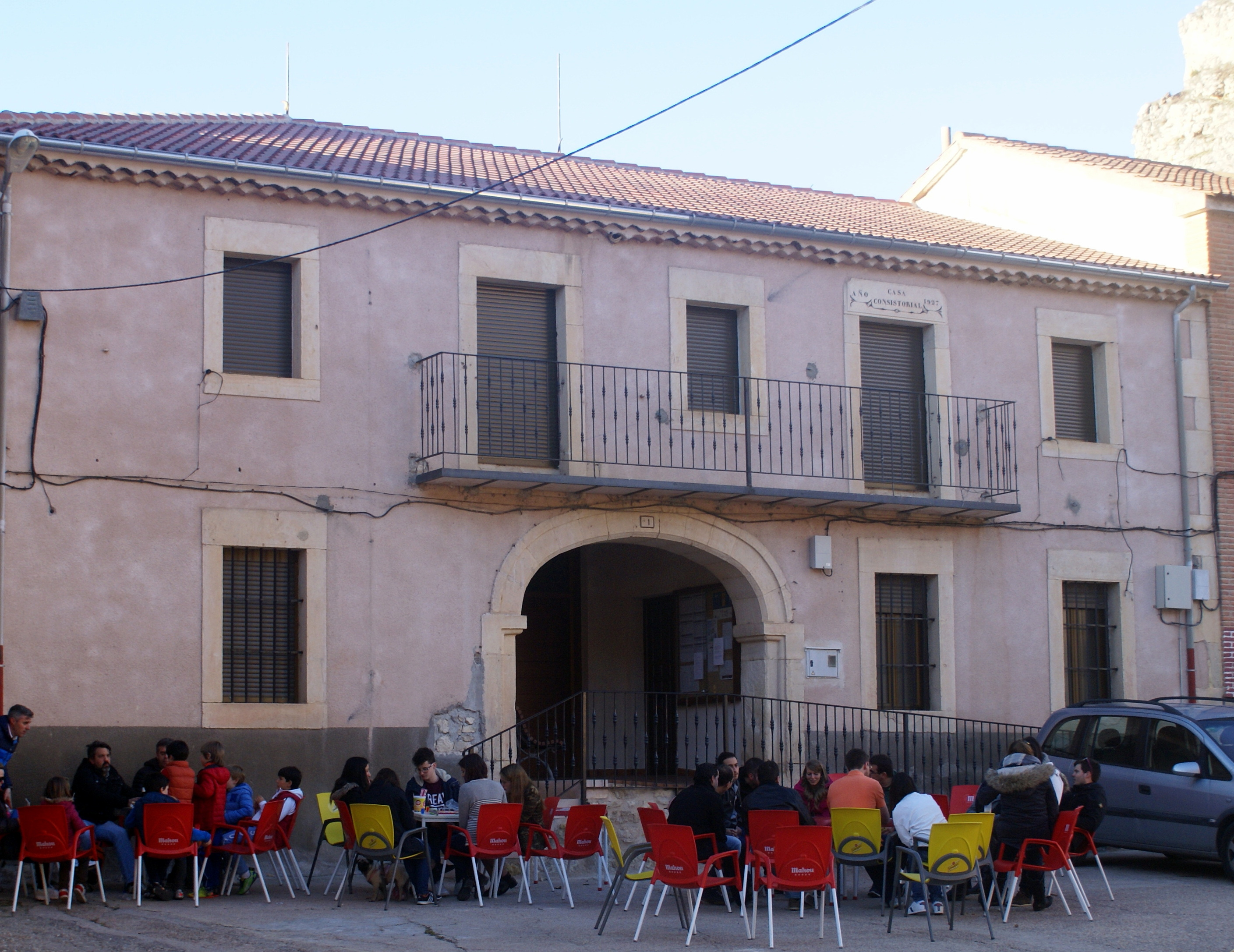
- Town hall of Valle de Tabladillo, Segovia, Spain.

- Location in Spain. Valle de Tabladillo (Spain)
- Coordinates: 41°21′47″N 3°50′23″W
- Country: Spain
- Autonomous community: Castile and León
- Province: Segovia
- Municipality: Valle de Tabladillo

Area
  - Total: 16 km^{2} (6.2 sq mi)

Population (2025-01-01)
  - Total: 78
  - Density: 4.9/km^{2} (13/sq mi)
- Time zone: UTC+1 (CET)
  - Summer (DST): UTC+2 (CEST)
- Website: Official website

Valle de Tabladillo is a municipality located in the province of Segovia, Castile and León, Spain. According to the 2004 census (INE), the municipality has a population of 151 inhabitants.
