= San Pedro de Gaíllos =

- Municipality
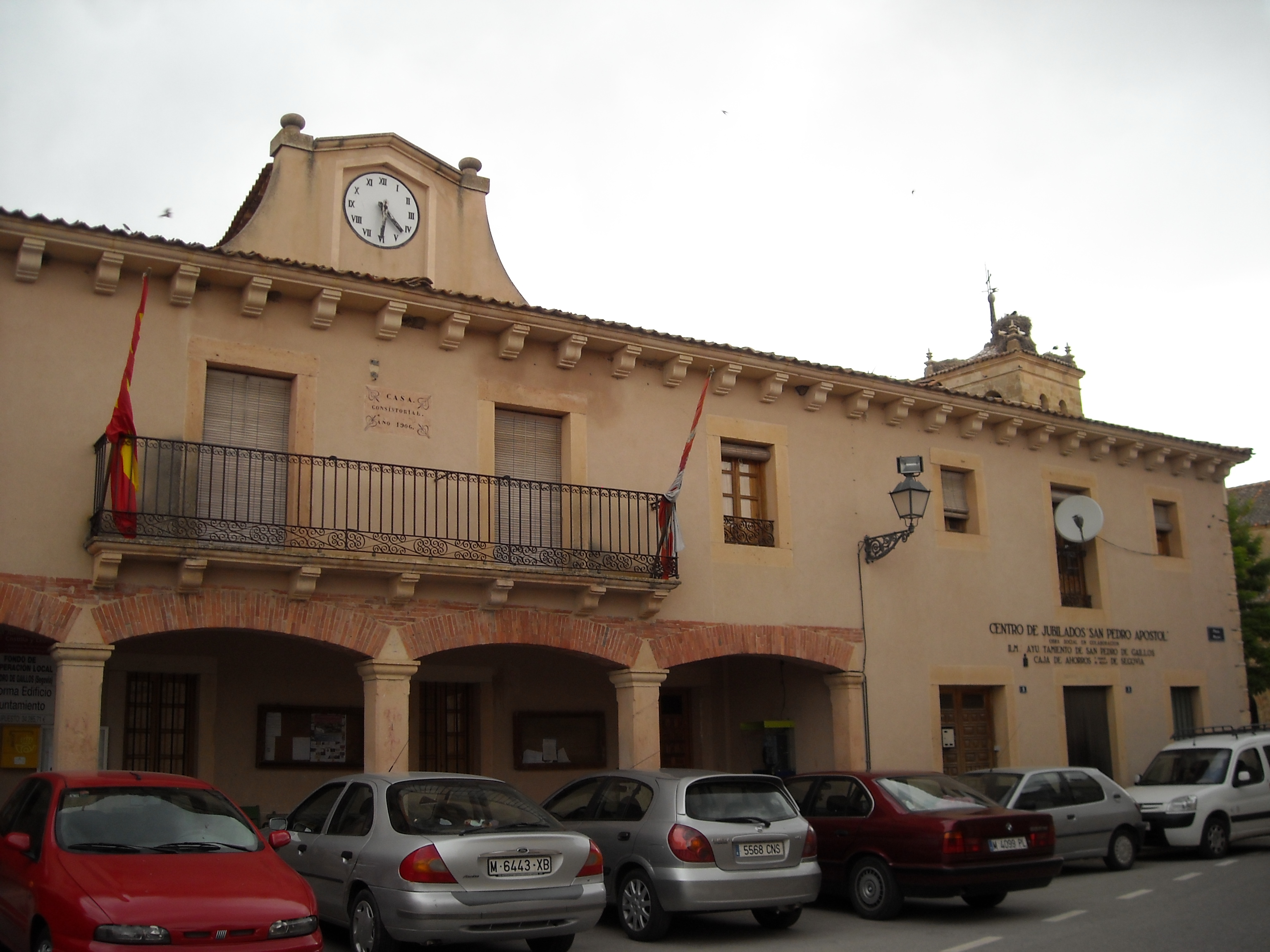
- Town hall, San Pedro de Gaíllos, Segovia, Spain in 2009

- Flag Coat of arms

- Location in Spain. San Pedro de Gaíllos (Spain)
- Coordinates: 41°13′37″N 3°48′33″W
- Country: Spain
- Autonomous community: Castile and León
- Province: Segovia
- Municipality: San Pedro de Gaíllos

Area
  - Total: 26 km^{2} (10 sq mi)

Population (2025-01-01)
  - Total: 315
  - Density: 12/km^{2} (31/sq mi)
- Time zone: UTC+1 (CET)
  - Summer (DST): UTC+2 (CEST)
- Climate: Csb
- Website: Official website

San Pedro de Gaíllos is a municipality located in the province of Segovia, Castile and León, Spain. According to the 2004 census (INE), the municipality has a population of 353 inhabitants.
