= Puebla de Pedraza =

- Municipality
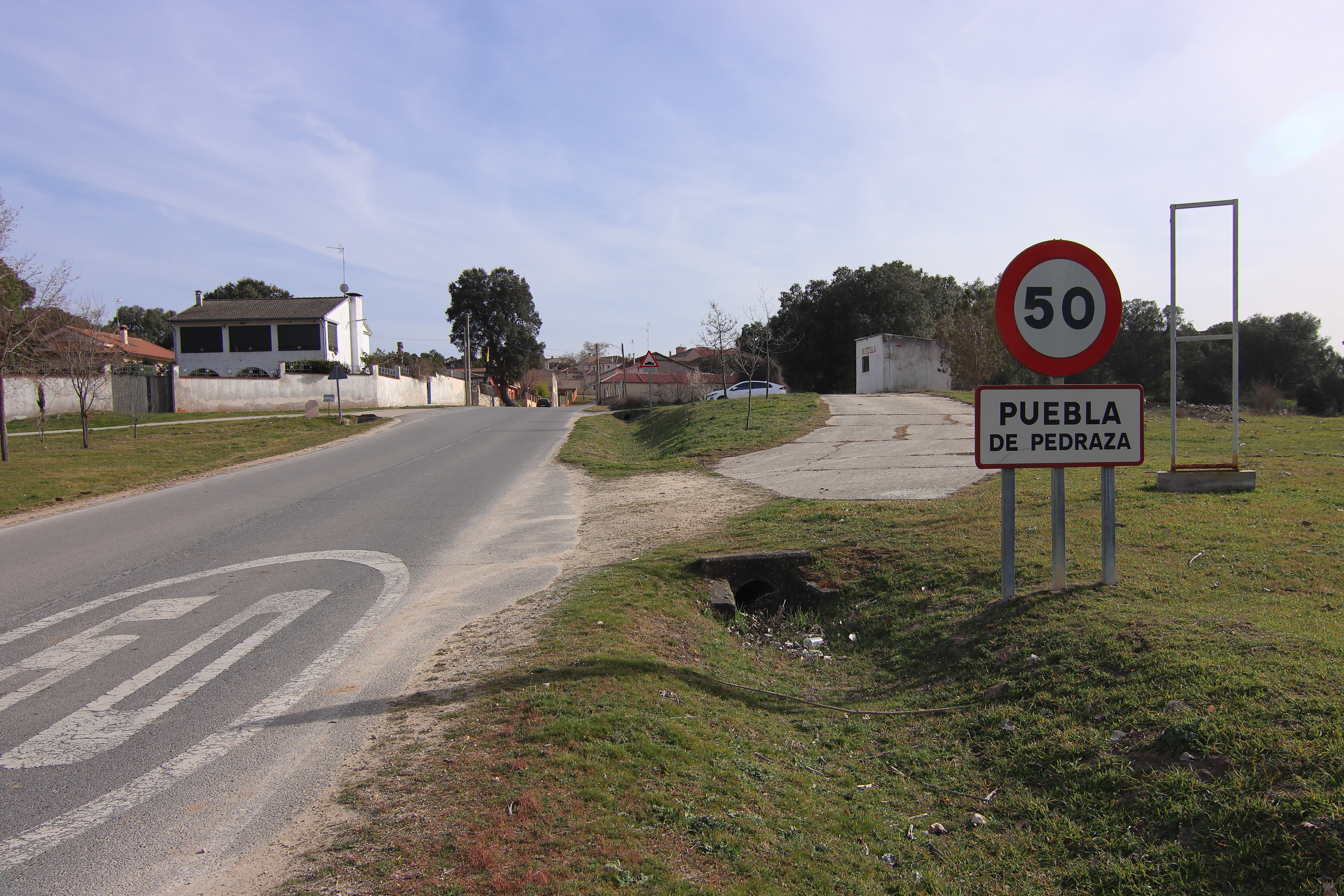

- Location in Spain. Puebla de Pedraza (Spain)
- Coordinates: 41°12′16″N 3°54′49″W
- Country: Spain
- Autonomous community: Castile and León
- Province: Segovia
- Municipality: Puebla de Pedraza

Area
  - Total: 17.61 km^{2} (6.80 sq mi)
- Elevation: 954 m (3,130 ft)

Population (2025-01-01)
  - Total: 56
  - Density: 3.2/km^{2} (8.2/sq mi)
- Time zone: UTC+1 (CET)
  - Summer (DST): UTC+2 (CEST)
- Website: Official website

Puebla de Pedraza is a municipality located in the province of Segovia, Castile and León, Spain. According to the 2004 census (INE), the municipality had a population of 91 inhabitants.
