= Caballar =

- Municipality
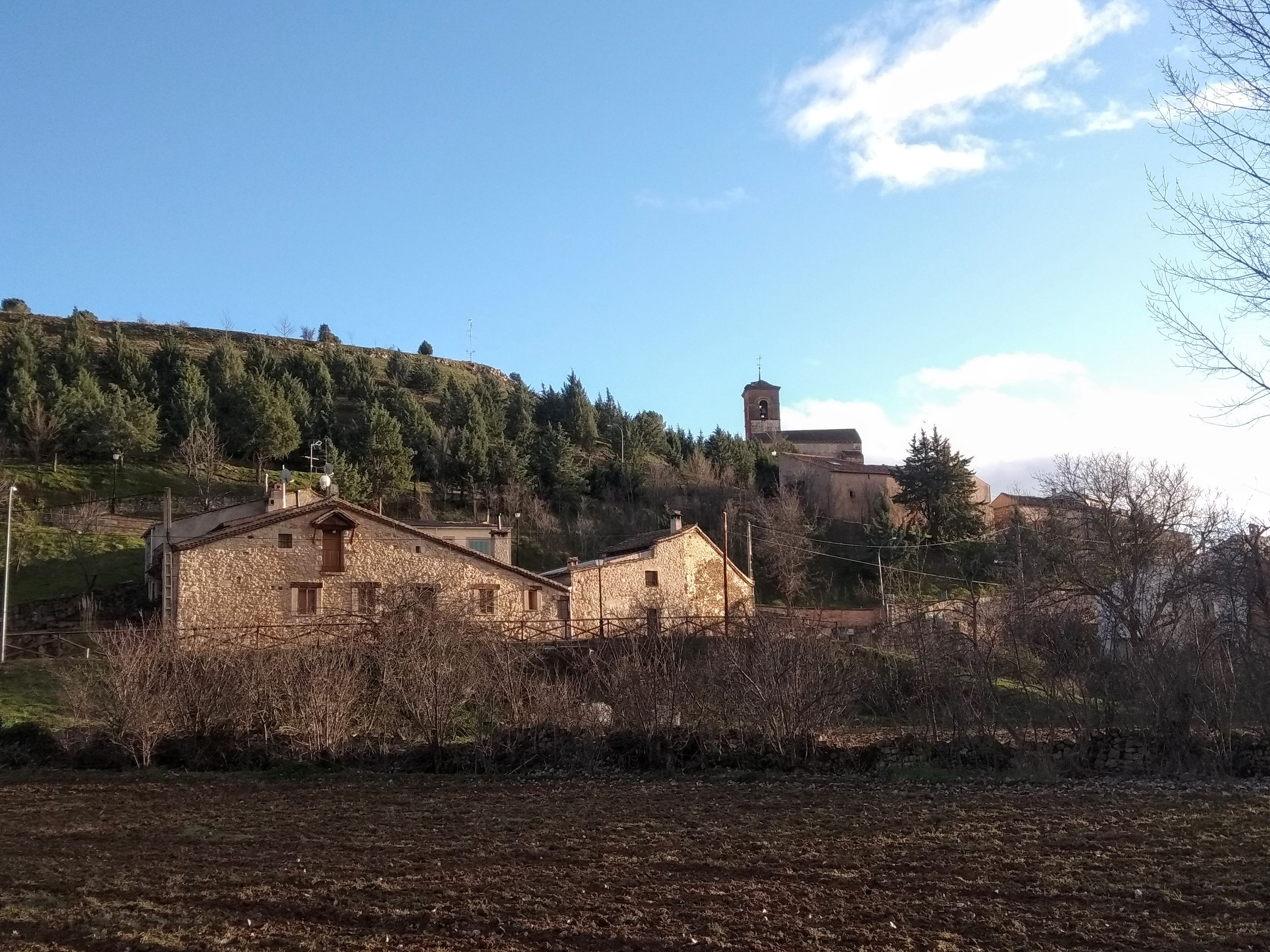
- View of Caballar

- Location in Spain. Caballar (Spain)
- Coordinates: 41°07′15″N 3°57′54″W
- Country: Spain
- Autonomous community: Castile and León
- Province: Segovia
- Municipality: Caballar

Area
  - Total: 16.83 km^{2} (6.50 sq mi)
- Elevation: 1,030 m (3,380 ft)

Population (2025-01-01)
  - Total: 78
  - Density: 4.6/km^{2} (12/sq mi)
- Time zone: UTC+1 (CET)
  - Summer (DST): UTC+2 (CEST)
- Website: Official website

Caballar is a municipality located in the province of Segovia, Castile and León, Spain. According to the 2004 census (INE), the municipality had a population of 104 inhabitants.
