= Valleruela de Sepúlveda =

- Municipality
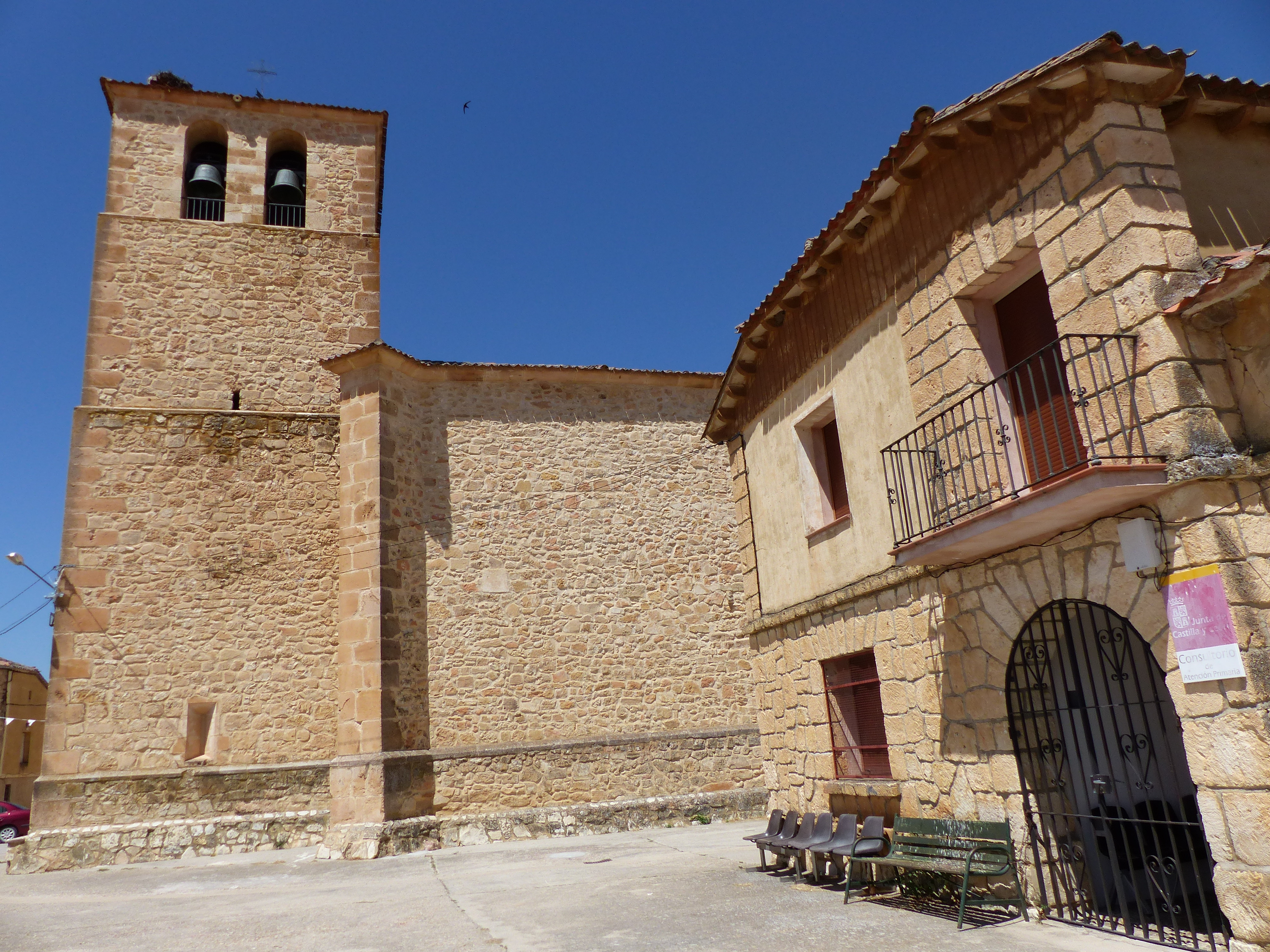
- Church of Valleruela de Sepúlveda

- Location in Spain. Valleruela de Sepúlveda (Spain)
- Coordinates: 41°11′16″N 3°46′22″W
- Country: Spain
- Autonomous community: Castile and León
- Province: Segovia
- Municipality: Valleruela de Sepúlveda

Area
  - Total: 16 km^{2} (6.2 sq mi)

Population (2025-01-01)
  - Total: 48
  - Density: 3.0/km^{2} (7.8/sq mi)
- Time zone: UTC+1 (CET)
  - Summer (DST): UTC+2 (CEST)
- Website: Official website

Valleruela de Sepúlveda is a municipality located in the province of Segovia, Castile and León, Spain. According to the 2004 census (INE), the municipality has a population of 70 inhabitants.
