= Cobos de Fuentidueña =

- Municipality
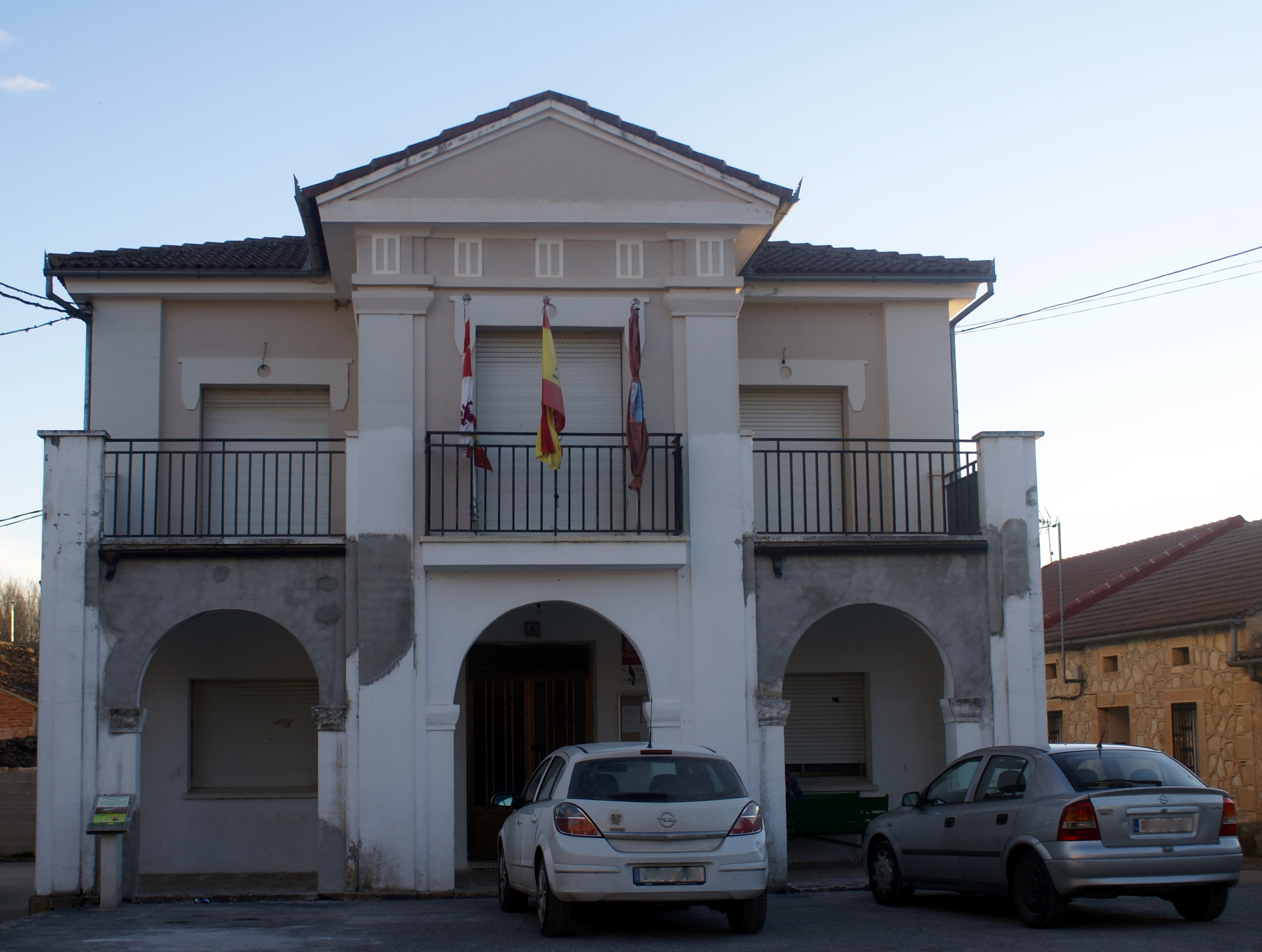
- Town hall of Cobos de Fuentidueña, Segovia, Spain. in 2016

- Location in Spain. Cobos de Fuentidueña (Spain)
- Coordinates: 41°22′58″N 3°55′38″W
- Country: Spain
- Autonomous community: Castile and León
- Province: Segovia
- Municipality: Cobos de Fuentidueña

Area
  - Total: 13 km^{2} (5.0 sq mi)

Population (2025-01-01)
  - Total: 25
  - Density: 1.9/km^{2} (5.0/sq mi)
- Time zone: UTC+1 (CET)
  - Summer (DST): UTC+2 (CEST)
- Website: Official website

Cobos de Fuentidueña is a municipality in the province of Segovia, Castile and León, Spain. According to the 2004 census (INE), the municipality has a population of 56.
