= Brieva =

- Municipality
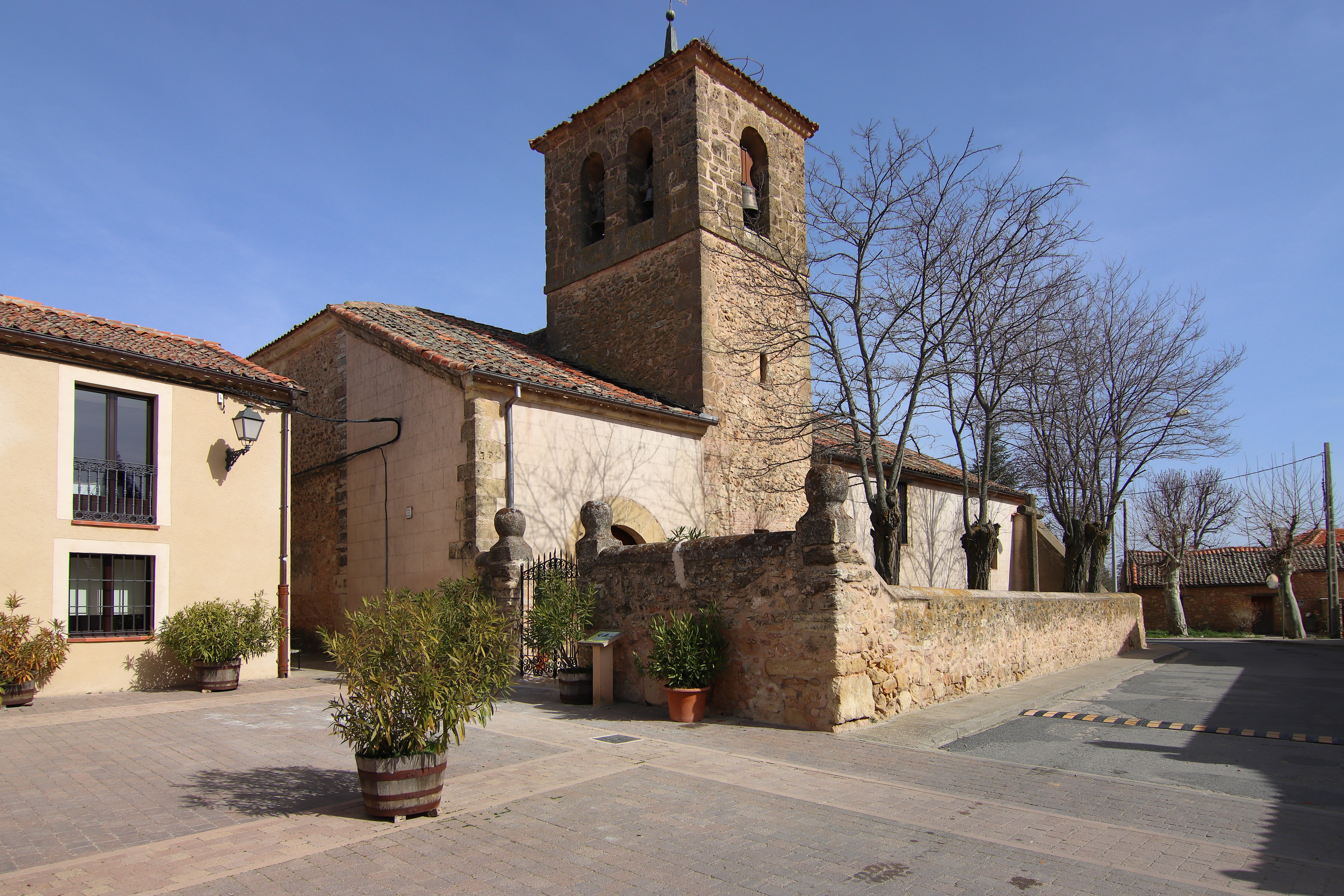
- Church of Santiago Apóstol, Brieva, tower

- Flag Coat of arms

- Location in Spain. Brieva (Spain)
- Coordinates: 41°02′04″N 4°03′12″W
- Country: Spain
- Autonomous community: Castile and León
- Province: Segovia
- Municipality: Brieva

Area
  - Total: 13.70 km^{2} (5.29 sq mi)
- Elevation: 1,089 m (3,573 ft)

Population (2025-01-01)
  - Total: 93
  - Density: 6.8/km^{2} (18/sq mi)
- Time zone: UTC+1 (CET)
  - Summer (DST): UTC+2 (CEST)
- Website: Official website

41°2′5″N 4°3′14″W

Brieva is a municipality located in the province of Segovia, Castile and León, Spain. According to the 2004 census (INE), the municipality had a population of 71 inhabitants.
