= Barallete =

Cant from Ourense, Spain

Barallete is a largely vanished argot which used to be employed by the traditional knife-sharpeners and umbrella-repairers (afiadores e paragüeiros) of the Galician province of Ourense, in Spain.

It was based on the Galician language as spoken in Ourense, but its users substituted everyday words with invented ones of no linguistic connection, making it impossible for other people to understand it.

== Example ==
An example of Barallete is:

Habia que chusar anque oretee ou axa barruxo, porque facía falta zurro, que Sanqueico nono da de balde.

"We had to work even if it rained or even if there was mud, because money was needed, and God does not provide it free".

The same sentence in standard Galician:

Había que traballar aín[da ]que chova ou haxa barro, porque facía falta diñeiro, que Deus non o dá de balde.

Barallete is said to have arisen in the twelfth century, and many words and phrases from this argot have been published in various recent works of fiction and non-fiction.For example: "Rayos", Miqui Otero,2016

== See also ==
- Bron
- Cant
- Gacería

== Sources ==
- (in Spanish) Musica
- (in Spanish) Vacariza
