= Cantalejo =

Cantalejo Vilorio Sierte
- Municipality
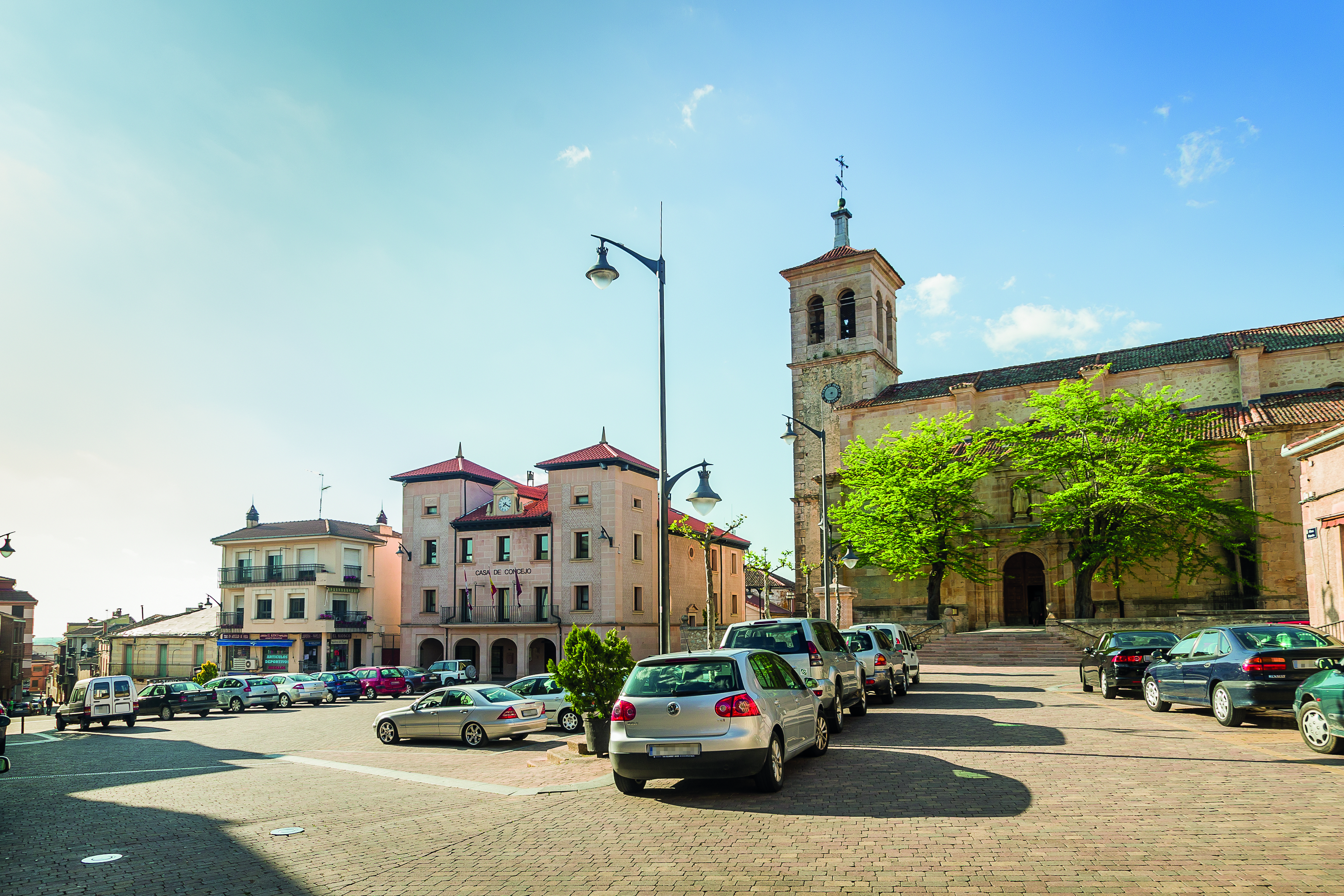
- Town Hall and Plaza de Cantalejo

- Location in Spain. Cantalejo (Spain)
- Coordinates: 41°15′32″N 3°55′43″W
- Country: Spain
- Autonomous community: Castile and León
- Province: Segovia
- Municipality: Cantalejo

Area
  - Total: 79.43 km^{2} (30.67 sq mi)
- Elevation: 963 m (3,159 ft)

Population (2025-01-01)
  - Total: 3,619
  - Density: 45.56/km^{2} (118.0/sq mi)
- Time zone: UTC+1 (CET)
  - Summer (DST): UTC+2 (CEST)
- Website: Official website

Cantalejo (Gacería: Vilorio Sierte) is a municipality located in the province of Segovia, Castile and León, Spain. According to the 2023 census (INE), the municipality had a population of 3,546 inhabitants. The dialect known as Gacería is spoken here.
