= Latín dos canteiros =

Secret cant used by stonecutters from Galicia, Spain

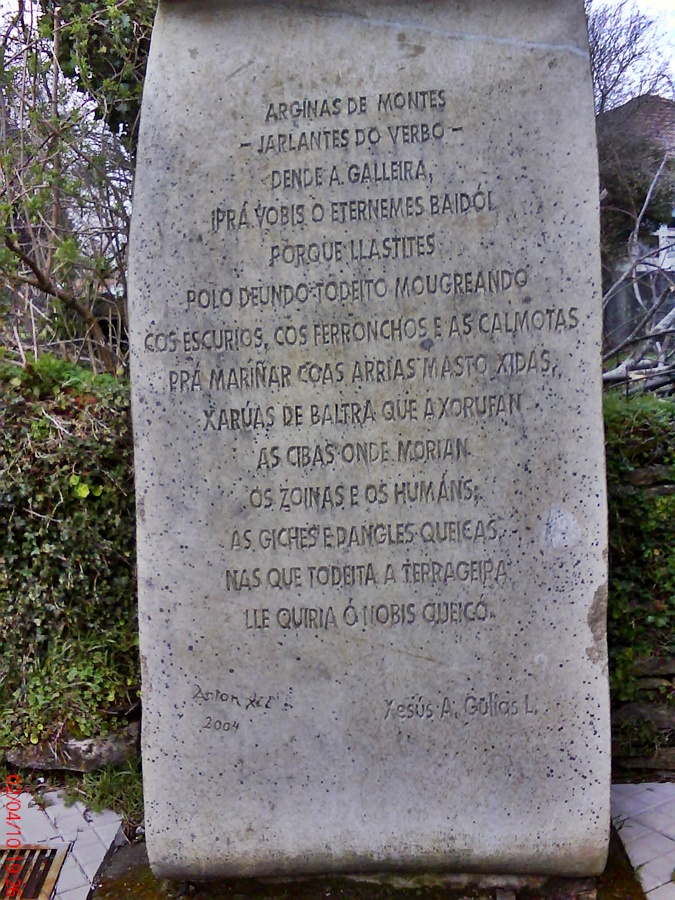
Stone monument from Beariz with a poem by Xesús Antonio Gulías Lamas in the cant.

Latín dos canteiros ("Latin of the stonecutters") or verbo dos arxinas is an argot employed by stonecutters in Galicia, Spain, particularly in the area of Pontevedra, based on the Galician language. They handed down their knowledge in the art of how to split and cut stone by means of this secret language to the next generation.

== Description ==
The argot contains a number of Basque loanwords.

== Sample of text ==
In latín dos canteiros	English translation
Morrón: pra cubicar muriar xidavante da argina,	Boy, if you want to practise the job as a stone breaker well,
xeres interbar o verbo das arginas xejorrumeando explicas es deeglase dadellastadaria e xeras enenvestar moxe xido.	you have to know the language in which the laws of how to cut stone are explained [...].
Cando anisques solóte polo deundo a murriar como artina,	When you go out into the world alone to work as a stone breaker,
xera jalrruar toi compinches o nobis verbo	you will talk to your job comrades in our language,
si xeres te ormeando aprecio os do gichoficienes	if you want to be esteemed by them
e nente de xerian perreamente os lapingos e buxos.	and not be treated badly by the masters and misters.
Xilón, nexo agiote;	Boy, you will not be a thief,
xilón, nexo chumar;	boy, you will not be a drinker,
xilón, nexo esqueirar;	boy, you will not be a liar;
xilón, xido cabancar;	boy, you will be well doing;
xilón, xido entileger;	boy, you will be taught;
xilón, xido vay;	boy, you will be true.
xilón, xido murriar.	boy, you will be a worker."

== See also ==
- Barallete
- Bron
- Cant
- Gacería
