= Aldealcorvo =

- Municipality
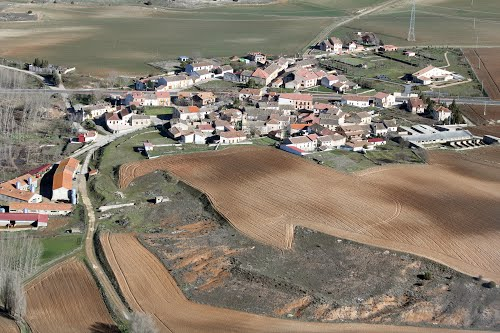
- Aerial View of Aldealcorvo

- Location in Spain. Aldealcorvo (Spain)
- Coordinates: 41°14′38″N 3°47′31″W
- Country: Spain
- Autonomous community: Castile and León
- Province: Segovia
- Municipality: Aldealcorvo

Area
  - Total: 6.11 km^{2} (2.36 sq mi)
- Elevation: 759 m (2,490 ft)

Population (2025-01-01)
  - Total: 15
  - Density: 2.5/km^{2} (6.4/sq mi)
- Time zone: UTC+1 (CET)
  - Summer (DST): UTC+2 (CEST)
- Website: Official website

Aldealcorvo is a municipality located in the province of Segovia, Castile and León, Spain. According to the 2004 census (INE), the municipality had a population of 21 inhabitants.
