= La Matilla =

- Municipality
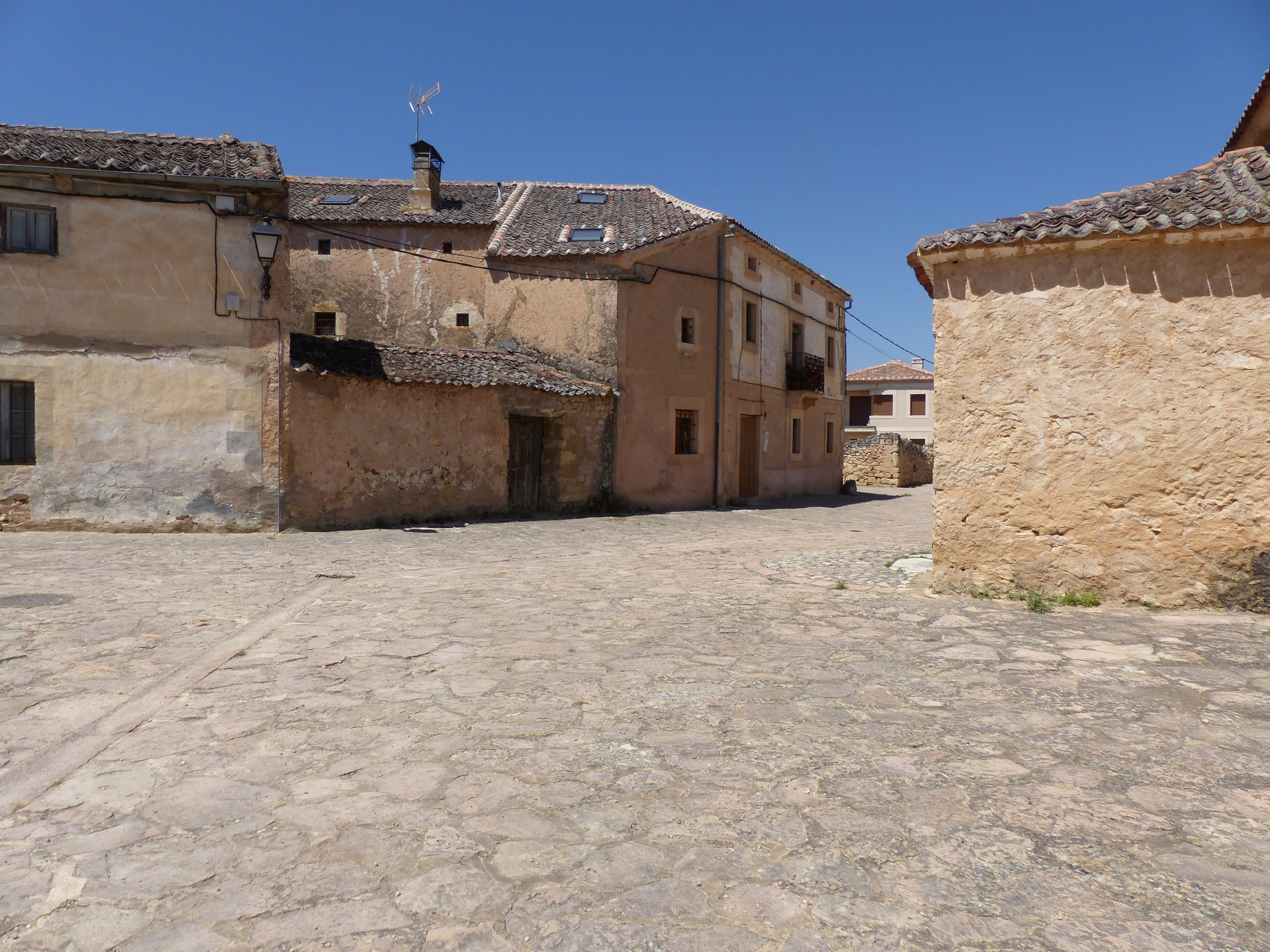

- Flag Coat of arms

- Location in Spain. La Matilla (Spain)
- Coordinates: 41°11′28″N 3°47′42″W
- Country: Spain
- Autonomous community: Castile and León
- Province: Segovia
- Municipality: La Matilla

Area
  - Total: 7 km^{2} (2.7 sq mi)

Population (2025-01-01)
  - Total: 72
  - Density: 10/km^{2} (27/sq mi)
- Time zone: UTC+1 (CET)
  - Summer (DST): UTC+2 (CEST)
- Website: Official website

La Matilla is a municipality located in the province of Segovia, Castile and León, Spain. According to the 2004 census (INE), the municipality has a population of 114 inhabitants.
