= Navalilla =

- Municipality
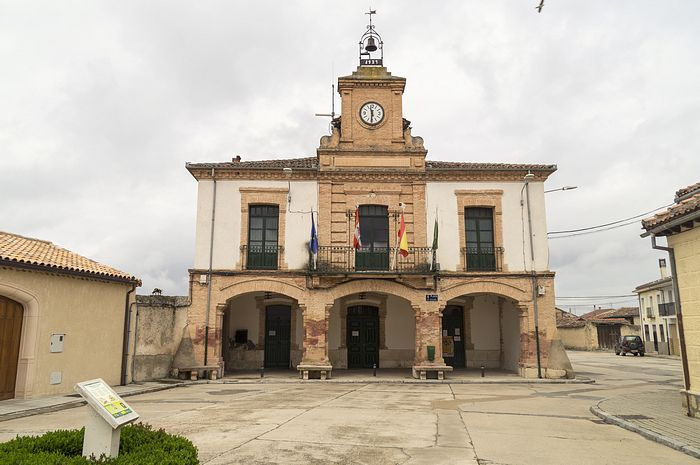
- Navalilla - Town Hall

- Flag Coat of arms

- Location in Spain. Navalilla (Spain)
- Coordinates: 41°20′26″N 3°55′57″W
- Country: Spain
- Autonomous community: Castile and León
- Province: Segovia
- Municipality: Navalilla

Area
  - Total: 20 km^{2} (7.7 sq mi)

Population (2025-01-01)
  - Total: 90
  - Density: 4.5/km^{2} (12/sq mi)
- Time zone: UTC+1 (CET)
  - Summer (DST): UTC+2 (CEST)

Navalilla is a municipality located in the province of Segovia, Castile and León, Spain. According to the 2004 census (INE), the municipality has a population of 134 inhabitants.
