= Valleruela de Pedraza =

- Municipality
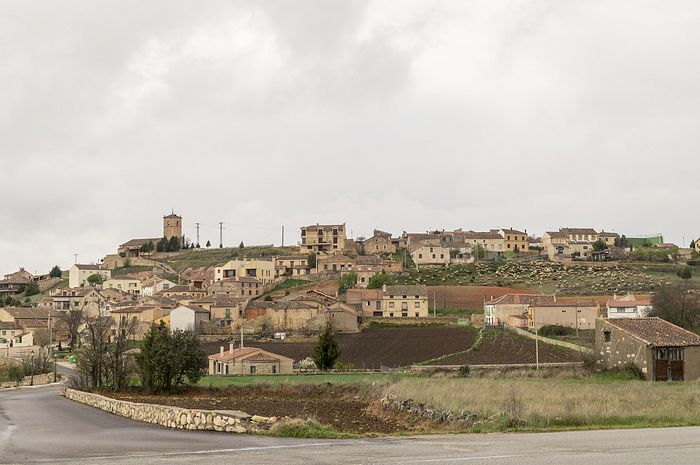
- Entrance to Valleruela de Pedraza

- Location in Spain. Valleruela de Pedraza (Spain)
- Coordinates: 41°10′46″N 3°48′23″W
- Country: Spain
- Autonomous community: Castile and León
- Province: Segovia
- Municipality: Valleruela de Pedraza

Area
  - Total: 9 km^{2} (3.5 sq mi)

Population (2025-01-01)
  - Total: 61
  - Density: 6.8/km^{2} (18/sq mi)
- Time zone: UTC+1 (CET)
  - Summer (DST): UTC+2 (CEST)
- Website: Official website

Valleruela de Pedraza is a municipality located in the province of Segovia, Castile and León, Spain. According to the 2004 census (INE), the municipality has a population of 67 inhabitants.
