= Veganzones =

- Municipality
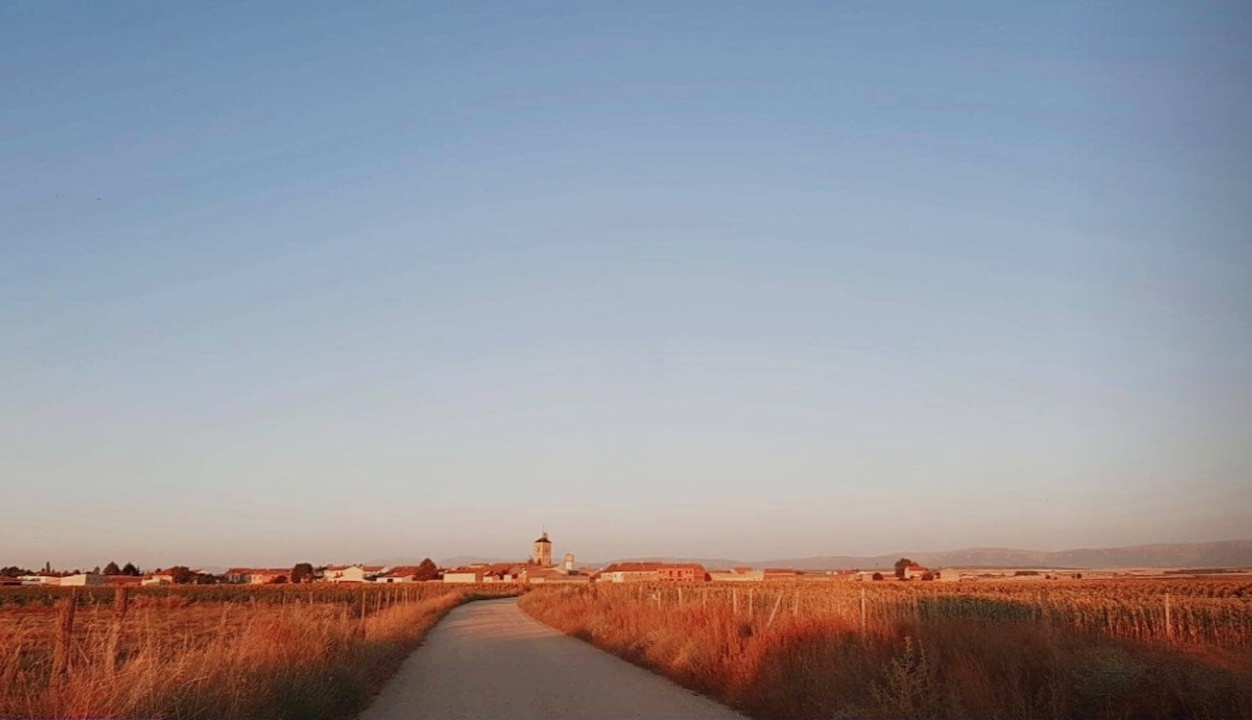
- Veganzones from the Camino de Veganzones that connects the town with neighboring Sauquillo de Cabezas

- Flag Coat of arms

- Location in Spain. Veganzones (Spain)
- Coordinates: 41°11′34″N 3°59′38″W
- Country: Spain
- Autonomous community: Castile and León
- Province: Segovia
- Municipality: Veganzones

Area
  - Total: 21 km^{2} (8.1 sq mi)

Population (2025-01-01)
  - Total: 211
  - Density: 10/km^{2} (26/sq mi)
- Time zone: UTC+1 (CET)
  - Summer (DST): UTC+2 (CEST)
- Website: Official website

Veganzones is a municipality located in the province of Segovia, Castile and León, Spain. According to the 2020 census (INE), the municipality has a population of 219 inhabitants.
