= San Miguel de Bernuy =

Coordinates: 41°24′N 3°57′W

- Municipality
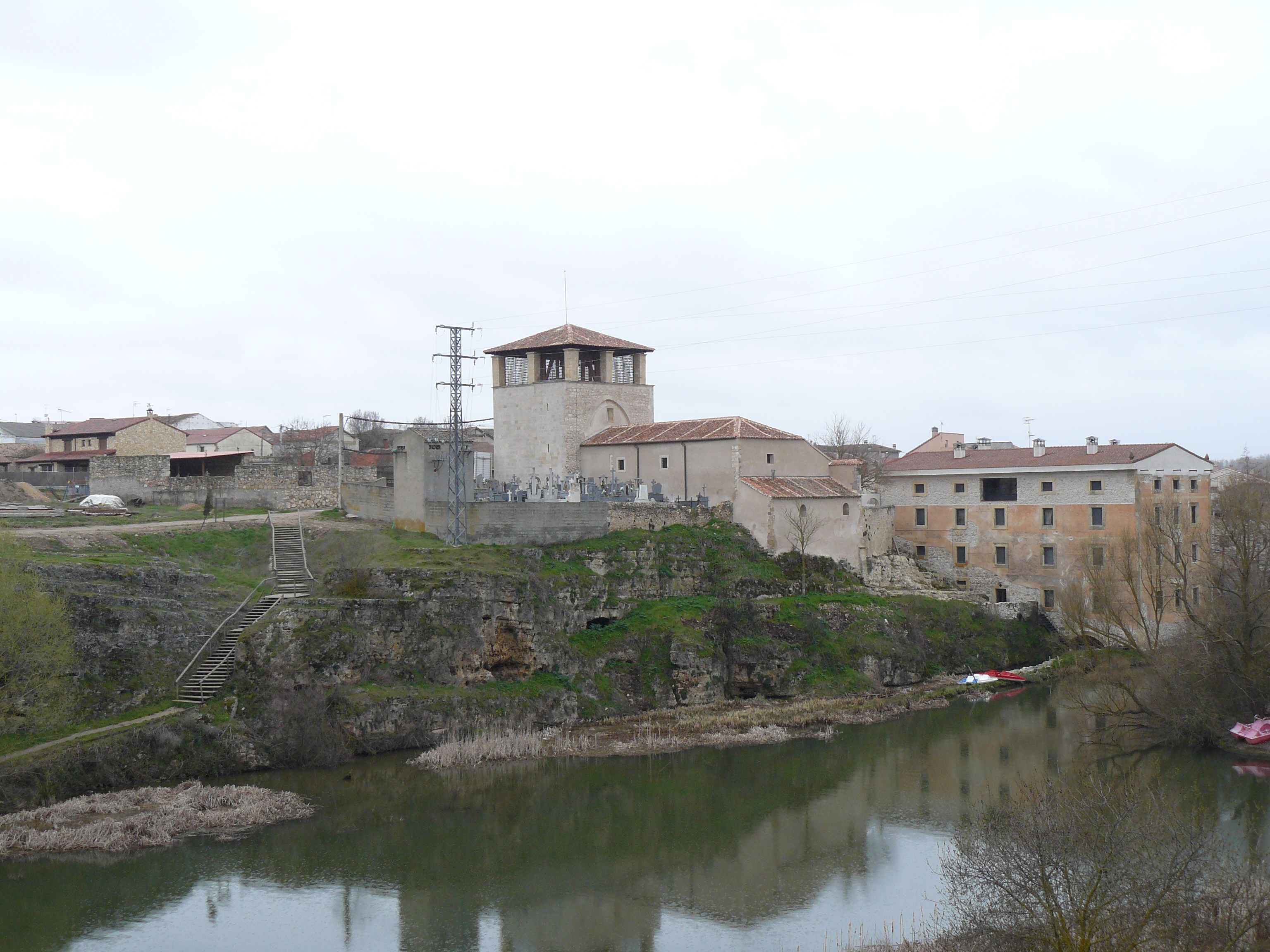

- Flag Coat of arms
- Interactive map of San Miguel de Bernuy
- Country: Spain
- Autonomous community: Castile and León
- Province: Segovia
- Municipality: San Miguel de Bernuy

Area
  - Total: 18 km^{2} (6.9 sq mi)

Population (2025-01-01)
  - Total: 119
  - Density: 6.6/km^{2} (17/sq mi)
- Time zone: UTC+1 (CET)
  - Summer (DST): UTC+2 (CEST)
- Website: Official website

San Miguel de Bernuy is a municipality located in the province of Segovia, Castile and León, Spain. As of 2016, the municipality has a population of 148.
