= Rebollo =

- Municipality
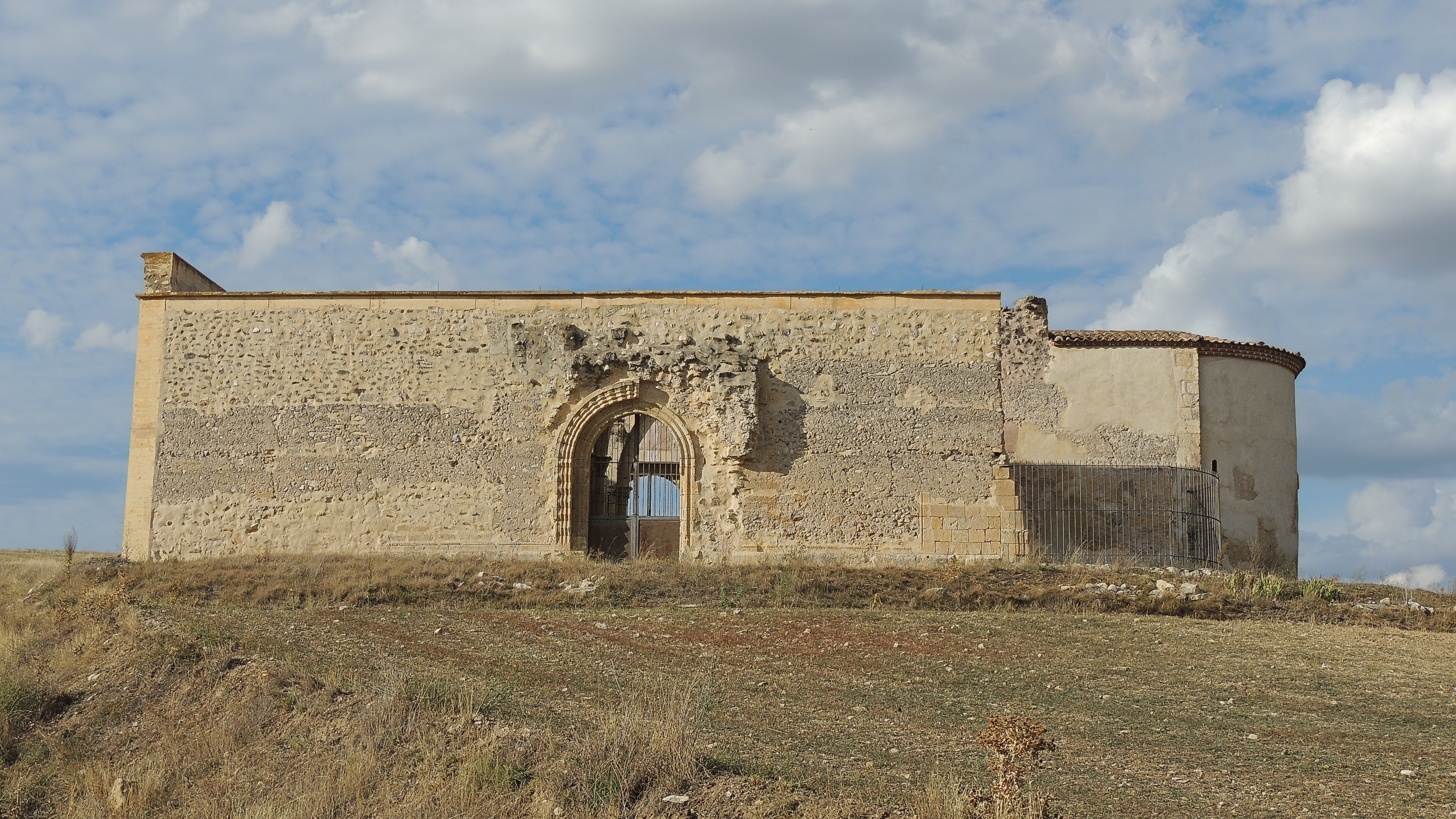

- Location in Spain. Rebollo (Spain)
- Coordinates: 41°11′34″N 3°51′28″W
- Country: Spain
- Autonomous community: Castile and León
- Province: Segovia
- Municipality: Rebollo

Area
  - Total: 13 km^{2} (5.0 sq mi)

Population (2025-01-01)
  - Total: 70
  - Density: 5.4/km^{2} (14/sq mi)
- Time zone: UTC+1 (CET)
  - Summer (DST): UTC+2 (CEST)
- Website: Official website

Rebollo is a municipality located in the province of Segovia, Castile and León, Spain. According to the 2004 census (INE), the municipality has a population of 126 inhabitants.
