= Bron (cant) =

Spanish coppersmith's argot

Bron is an argot (a cant) spoken by itinerant coppersmiths and tinkers in Miranda, Avilés, Asturias, Spain, as well as textile merchants in Fornela, León, Spain (where it is known as burón) and Cantal, Auvergne, France (where it is known as "broum" or "brount"). Despite being endemic to Asturias, both bron and xíriga (spoken by traveling craftsmen) are unrelated to the Asturian language (bable).

== See also ==
- Xíriga
- Fala dos arxinas
- Gacería
- Mansolea
- Tixileiro
  - Manconeiru
