= Valencian Sign Language =

Sign language used in Valencia, Spain

- Llengua de signes valenciana
- Native to: Spain
- Region: Valencian Community.
- Native speakers: 6,000–10,000 (2014)
- Language family: possibly French SL: Catalan Sign Language; Valencian Sign Language

Language codes
- ISO 639-3: vsv
- Glottolog: vale1251
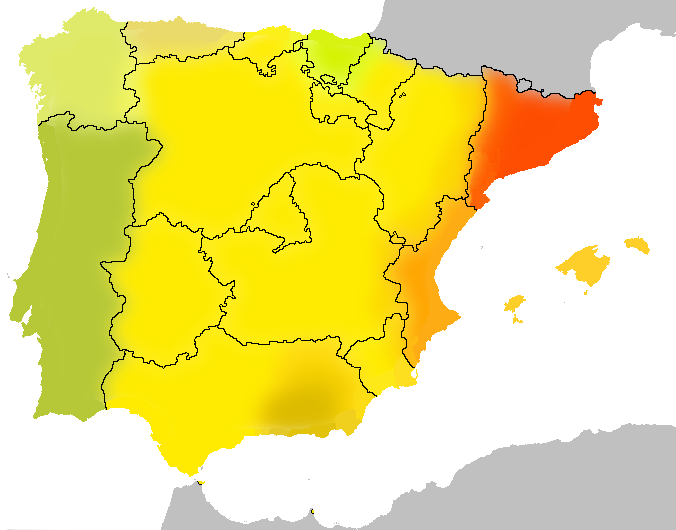
- Sign language use in Spain. LSE is shown in yellow, LSC in red, and LSV in orange. Non-yellow color variations represent degrees of differentiation from LSE.

Valencian Sign Language (Valencian: Llengua de signes valenciana [ˈʎeŋɡwa ðe ˈsiŋnez valensiˈana]; LSV (Note: Also abbreviated as LSCV (for Llengua de signes de la Comunitat Valenciana) and LSPV (for Llengua de signes del País Valencià))) is a sign language used by deaf people in the Valencian Community, Spain. It is closely related to Catalan Sign Language (LSC); they are variously described as similar languages or as dialects of a single language.

Valencia was the first Spanish autonomous community to support the use of sign language in the Statute of Autonomy, but does not specify which sign language is to be used. The use of LSV in Valencia has, however, diminished and is restricted to administrative communications and occasional usage in the media.

== Learning LSV ==
- "¡A Signar!", Interactive CD-ROM. FESORD. València 1999. ISBN 84-605-9699-0.
