= Movement for the officiality of the Asturian language =

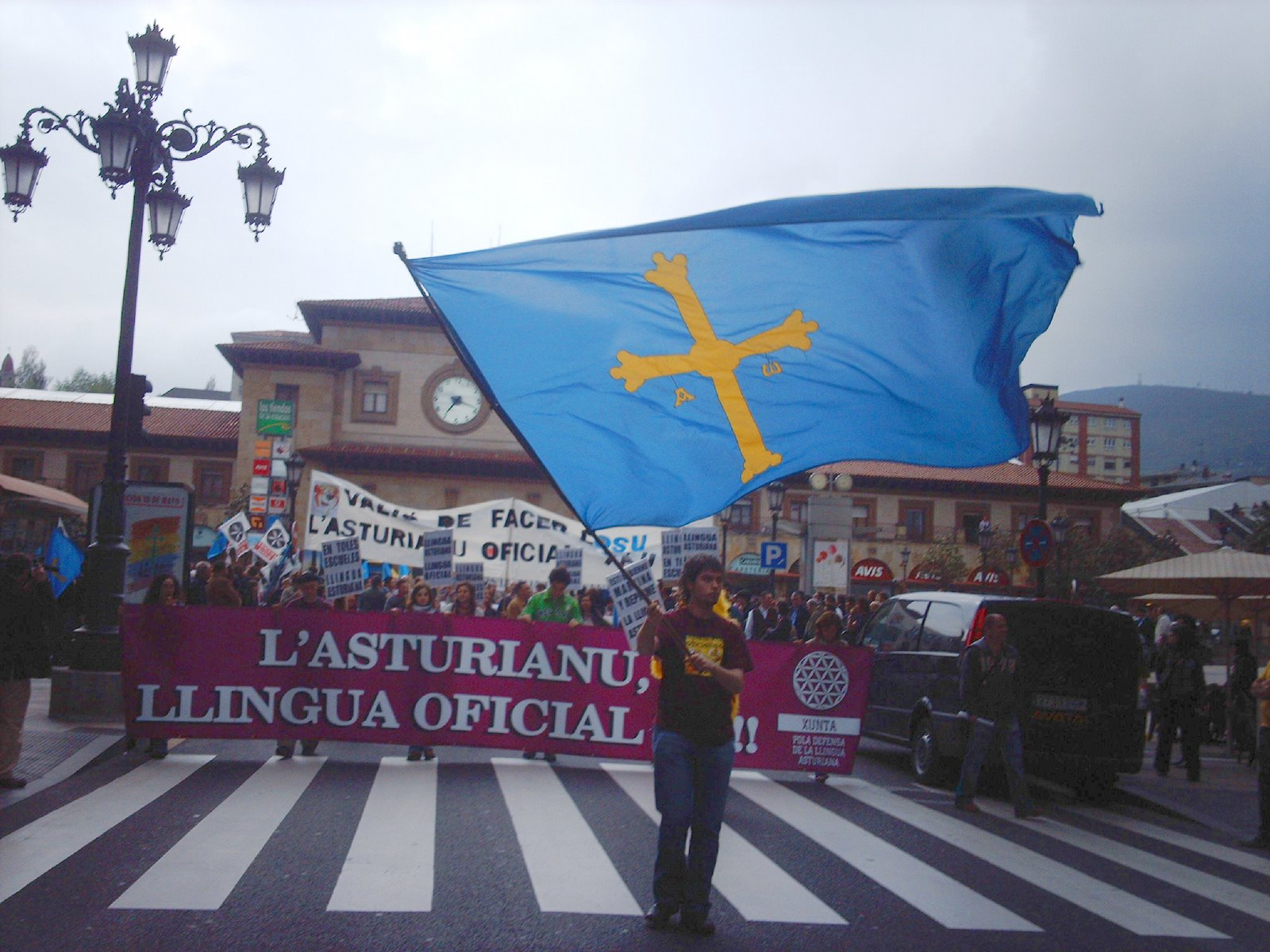
Day of the Asturian letters, 2007

The movement for the officiality of the Asturian language (movimientu pola oficialidá de la llingua asturiana in Asturian), also known as the movement for the officiality (movimientu pola oficialidá) is the social movement present in Asturias, in northwest Spain, that demands that the Statute of Autonomy of the Principality of Asturias give Asturian the same role as Spanish, like it occurs in other Autonomous Communities with its own language.

== Ideology ==
The movement is based on the idea that the Asturian language, as the language of the Principality of Asturias, deserves a similar treatment to that of other regional languages in Spanish (Basque language in the Basque Country, Catalan language in Catalonia, Valencian Community and Balearic Islands and Galician language in Galicia), as well as supporting the idea that it is an intangible heritage worth preserving, so the official status is needed in order to ensure its survival. Other views of the movement, more focused on the civil rights emphasize the lack of rights that the average citizen has, if he wants to use Asturian at the administration.

== History ==
While some parts of the population of Asturias have always been concerned about the protection and the use of the Asturian language, with defenders such as Jovellanos (who in the late 18th century proposes the creation of an academy that regulates Asturian), it's in the seventies when the movement for the officiality arises. The first manifestation about it took place in 1976, under the slogan "Asturian at school, regional autonomy" (Bable nes escueles, autonomía rexonal), since back then the biggest concern was teaching Asturian at school, as well as its general protection. Parallel to it, a campaign with the same slogan was created then, with massive amounts of graffiti with that slogan throughout Asturias.

After Galician language, Catalan language and Basque language got recognized as official language through their respective Statutes of Autonomy, the movement became more centered on achieving this recognition, not granted in the Statute of Autonomy of the Principality of Asturias in 1981.

In the following decades, the movement becomes slowly more widespread, getting parties that initially were opposed to support it. United Left (Izquierda Xunida in Asturian) would accept the officiality as a purpose for the nineties. Socially, the movement would also get more accepted, with achievements such as the creation of a category for the best song in Asturian at the Spanish Music Awards, or the creation of a law for the use and promotion of Asturian.

== See also ==
- Asturian language
- Academy of the Asturian Language
