= Catalan Sign Language =

Sign language of Catalonia

- Llengua de signes catalana
- Native to: Spain
- Region: Catalonia
- Native speakers: est. 9,000 (2014)
- Language family: possibly French SL: Catalan Sign Language
- Dialects: Valencian Sign

Language codes
- ISO 639-3: csc
- Glottolog: cata1287
- ELP: Catalan Sign Language
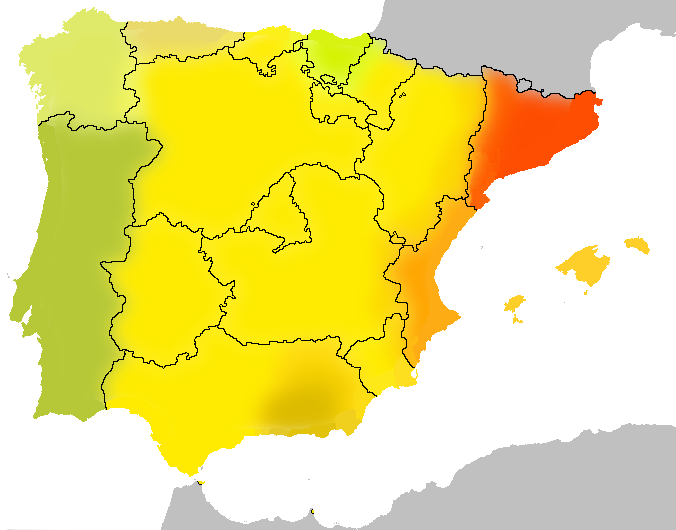
- Sign language use in Spain. LSE is shown in yellow, LSC in red, and LSV in orange. Non-yellow color variations respresent degrees of differentiation from LSE.

Catalan Sign Language (Catalan: Llengua de signes catalana, LSC; IPA: [ˈʎeŋɡwə ðə ˈsiŋnəs kətəˈlanə]) is a sign language used by around 18,000 people in different areas of Spain including Catalonia. It is also used in Andorra. As of 2012, the Catalan Federation for the Deaf estimates 25,000 LSC signers and roughly 12,000 deaf people around the Catalan lands. It has about 50% intelligibility with Spanish Sign Language (LSE). On the basis of mutual intelligibility, lexicon, and social attitudes, linguists have argued that LSC and LSE are distinct languages.

Since 1994, LSC has had official status, due to a law to promote the language promulgated by the Generalitat de Catalunya. Catalonia was the first Spanish Autonomous Community to approve a law for a sign language. It is also recognized by Andorra.

The Catalan Federation of Deaf People (FESOCAT) is an NGO founded in 1979 to represent and to defend the rights of deaf associations and individuals to achieve a full social participation and integration. FESOCAT organises several courses, activities, and meetings. In 2007, a bill was passed in Spain referred to as the "Bill of Deaf People" which was designed to cover sign language issues.

There are research groups for LSC, such as ILLESCAT (LSC Study Centre). This centre studies the evolution of the language, makes linguistic studies and creates new neologisms. The 'Platform for Linguistic and Cultural Rights for LSC Users' a.k.a. LSC, Ara! carried out a law to promote this language in the Statute of Autonomy.

== Classification ==
Wittmann (1991) suspects that LSC may be part of the French Sign Language family, but transmission to Catalonia would have happened early, and is not easy to demonstrate. Likewise, a Linguistic Professor from the University of La Coruña who specializes in LSC, found that the difference between a language like this and oral languages is the use of "neutral space" in front of the signer when speaking on real life situations as well as the use of visual character.

== Linguistic properties ==
LSC primarily uses two of the three planes: horizontal and vertical planes.

A 2008 study using LSC demonstrated a universal pattern in the manner in the way signed and spoken language are used to communicate ideas. The experiment took into consideration movement, handshape and location as the three modes of comparison and analysis.

In another study, the numeral signs of LSC were analyzed, noting the differing methods of signing numbers above five, which found some differences between LSC and American Sign Language (ASL) and emphasized how these changes can cause a language to change and evolve. Numbers in Catalan Sign Language are considered more "transparent" than numbers in Spanish and Catalan as the decimal values are made more explicit.

Impersonal sentences in LSC are determinant upon syntactic differences in pronominal forms, role shift, and spatial locations.

As in ASL, verbs are divided into simple, deictic, and spatial-locative verbs.

The complexity of signing metaphors in LSC was studied in an experiment involving double-mapping, and the iconicity in sign languages like LSC and ASL plays a fundamental role for cognitive theories noting the symbiotic relationship between grammar and bodily cognition. Deaf people in Catalonia are taught to read and write oral languages.

== LSC Award ==
In May 2015, the Departament de Cultura (Department for Culture) created the LSC Award in order to acknowledge individuals, institutions and initiatives for their contribution to the promotion and spreading of LSC.

This biennial award has the same consideration as other awards regarding spoken languages like the Pompeu Fabra Award for Catalan and the Robèrt Lafont Award for Occitan.

== See also ==
- Catalan manual alphabet
- Wikisign, LSC Wiki Dictionary
- Mira què dic, Diccionari Multimèdia de Signes de Catalunya (in Catalan)

== Relevant literature ==
- Altimira, Gemma Barberà. The meaning of space in sign language: reference, specificity and structure in Catalan Sign Language discourse. Vol. 4. Walter de Gruyter GmbH & Co KG, 2015.
- Barberà, Gemma. The meaning of space in Catalan Sign Language (LSC): Reference, specificity and structure in signed discourse. Sign Language & Linguistics 16, no. 1 (2013): 97-105.
- Barberà, Gemma, and Patricia Cabredo Hofherr. Backgrounded agents in Catalan Sign Language (LSC): Passives, middles, or impersonals? Language 93, no. 4 (2017): 767-798.
- Barberà, Gemma, and Josep Quer. "Impersonal reference in Catalan Sign Language (LSC)." Sign language research, uses and practices: Crossing views on theoretical and applied sign language linguistics (2013): 237-258.
- Barberà, Gemma, and Patricia Cabredo Hofherr. "Two indefinite pronouns in Catalan Sign Language (LSC)." Proceedings of Sinn Und Bedeutung. 2018; 21 (1): 89-106 (2018).
- Baus, Cristina, and Albert Costa. On the temporal dynamics of sign production: An ERP study in Catalan Sign Language (LSC). Brain Research 1609 (2015): 40-53.
- Jarque, Maria-Josep. Double mapping in metaphorical expressions of thought and communication in Catalan Sign Language (LSC). Sign language studies 5, no. 3 (2005): 292-316.
- Morales-López, Esperanza, Rosa Maria Boldú-Menasanch, Jesus Amador Alonso-Rodríguez, Victoria Gras-Ferrer, and Maria Ángeles Rodríguez-González. The verbal system of Catalan sign language (LSC). Sign language studies 5, no. 4 (2005): 441-496.
- Pfau, Roland, and Josep Quer. On the syntax of negation and modals in Catalan Sign Language and German Sign Language. Trends in Linguistics Studies and Monographs 188 (2007): 129.
- Quer, Josep. Legal pathways to the recognition of sign languages: A comparison of the Catalan and Spanish sign language acts. Sign Language Studies 12, no. 4 (2012): 565-582.
