= Spanish Sign Language =

Sign language used mainly by deaf people in Spain

- Lengua de signos española
- Native to: Spain
- Region: Undetermined central-interior region of Spain.
- Signers: 60,000 (2019)
- Language family: Possibly in the French Sign Language family, more likely a language isolate.: Spanish Sign Language

Language codes
- ISO 639-3: ssp
- Glottolog: span1263
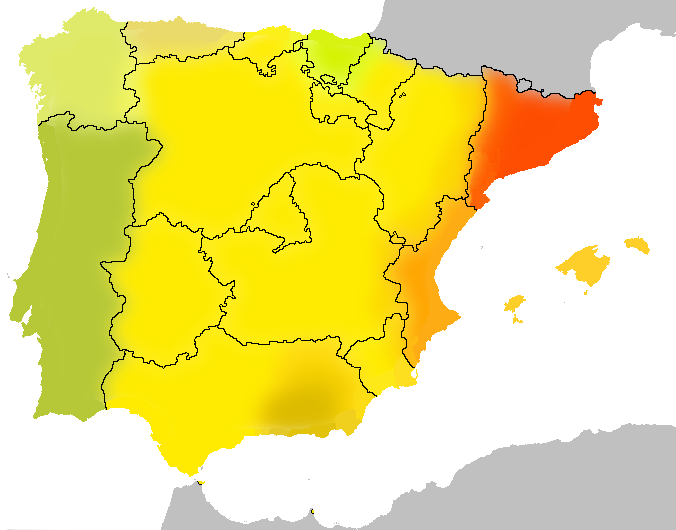
- Sign language use in Spain. LSE is shown in yellow, LSC in red, and LSV in orange. Non-yellow color variations represent degrees of differentiation from LSE.

Mónica speaking Spanish Sign Language

Spanish Sign Language (Spanish: Lengua de Signos Española, LSE) is a sign language used mainly by deaf people in Spain and the people who live with them. Although there are not many reliable statistics, it is estimated that there are over 100,000 speakers, 20-30% of whom use it as a second language.

From a strictly linguistic point of view, Spanish Sign Language refers to a sign language variety employed in an extensive central-interior area of the Iberian Peninsula, having Madrid as a cultural and linguistic epicenter, with other varieties used in regions such as Asturias, Aragon, Murcia, parts of western Andalusia and near the Province of Burgos.

Mutual intelligibility with the rest of the sign languages used in Spain is generally high due to a highly shared lexicon. However, Catalan Sign Language, Valencian Sign Language as well as the Spanish Sign Language dialects used in eastern Andalusia, Canary Islands, Galicia and Basque Country are the most distinctive lexically (between 10% and 30% difference in the use of nouns, depending on the case). Only the Catalan and Valencian Sign Languages share less than 75% of their vocabulary with the rest of the Spanish dialects, which makes them particularly marked, distinct dialects or even languages separate from Spanish Sign Language, depending on the methods used to determine language versus dialect. Some linguists consider both these and the Spanish Sign language three variants of a polymorphic sign language.

== See also ==
- Signed Spanish
