= Deafness in Romania =

Romania is home to about 25,000 deaf and hard of hearing people. Many of them use Romania Sign Language, Romania's legally recognized sign language, while some use Hungarian Sign Language. While some deaf students participate in mainstream school, Romania does have deaf schools that provide education to deaf students, one of which is a Hungarian-language deaf school.

== Sign language ==
The sign language used in Romania is called Limbaj Mimico-Gestual Romanesc (LMGR). According to the European Union of the Deaf (EUD), there are 24,601 deaf people using sign language in Romania and 12 LMGR interpreters. Ethnologue states that, in addition to the more than 24,000 LMGR users, there is an estimated 1,200 people using Hungarian Sign Language, Magyar jelnyelv (there is no abbreviation for this sign language). Both LMGR and Magyar jelnyelv are Deaf community sign languages. LMGR has been recognized by law as a language in Romania since 2002. LMGR and Hungarian Sign Language both have an EGIDS level of 5, meaning they are developing languages. LMGR's closest linguistic relatives include Polish Sign Language and Bulgarian Sign Language, while Hungarian Sign Language's closest linguistic relatives include Austrian Sign Language, Czech Sign Language, and Slovakian Sign Language.

== Newborn hearing screening ==
When born, about 57% of Romanian infants are given a hearing test. The vast majority of those screenings are done with otoacoustic emission or OAE. Since 2006, newborn hearing screening was included in a national program overseen by the Romanian Ministry of Health. However, there are no records of results of such screenings and no national statistics concerning deafness in newborns.

== Early intervention ==
In Romania early intervention for deaf and hard of hearing children starts with a newborn hearing screening. Not all newborns in Romania are given a hearing test. The rates of screening can vary. In the past few years rates of screening have increased; the highest recorded percentage being 74.61%. If a newborn fails this screening, their families are directed to follow up with an audiologist for further testing. However, many cases are what experts call "lost to follow-up," meaning the infant does not get seen by an audiologist or receive further testing. In Romania, expanding early intervention for deaf and hard of hearing children has become a priority due to an increase in the amount of people impacted by hearing loss. Early diagnosis and quick intervention correlate to an increase in both social and language skills. The majority of deaf children born to hearing parents are not exposed to sign language by their parents during the pre-school stages.

=== Cochlear implants ===
Cochlear implants (CIs) as well as Hearing aids are available in Romania, which are two forms of intervention for hearing loss. A national registry for CIs does not exist in Romania, and not all children eligible for CIs are able to get them. This is partly due to a shortage of CI centers; Romania only has seven while Germany has over 100. Between the years 2000 and 2015, 500 people were able to receive CIs through the Romanian National Health Program (NHP), as opposed to the 2,512 infants that were likely eligible for CIs. There is The Voice Project in Romania, which focused on vocational training for both speech therapists and parents on interacting with and supporting young children with CIs.

== Human and civil rights ==
Romania signed the Convention on the Rights of Persons with Disabilities (CRPD) on September 26, 2007. The CRPD was later ratified by Romania in January 2011. The optional protocol of the CRPD was signed by Romania in 2008. However, the optional protocol has not been ratified by Romania as of yet. In Romania deaf and deafblind individuals have a right to a licensed interpreter, both public and private institutions as well as the authorities must provide these services. However, Romania only has 12 interpreters for a population of over 24,000 deaf people. In the case of schooling, there are no laws protecting deaf and hard of hearing students' right to an inclusive education.

== Primary and secondary education ==
In Romania, like many other countries, there are specialized deaf schools for the education of deaf students. These schools have existed since the 1800s in Romania. Before the World War I, sign language instruction was present in Romanian deaf schools. After the war, these schools used oral teaching methods, meaning the education was focused on spoken and written Romanian and did not include sign language in the instruction. Romanian Sign Language was banned under communism and only after 1989 did sign language start to be used in deaf schools once again. However, sign language was not used in an instructional manner in Romanian deaf schools until the mid 2010s. Before that, students learned sign language from one another at school, not from teachers. Despite this, Romanian Sign Language is the preferred mode of communication for a large majority of the deaf community in Romania today.

In Romania disabled people are seven times more likely to have not attended any school. It is uncommon for deaf and hard of hearing students to reach secondary school. In the 1980s, most hearing students attended high school, while very few deaf students were able to get into a high school. Although, disability-based discrimination through secondary education is not permitted in Romania. Those who do attend school are able to be a part of mainstreamed education. However, an inclusive education is not a protected right for deaf and hard of hearing students, despite the fact that disability-based discrimination is prohibited. Most deaf and hard of hearing students are able to read and write, however, some did not develop those skills. A large part of the deaf and hard of hearing student population do not attend university, but many attend vocational school.

=== The Kozmutza Flora special school for the deaf ===
The Kozmutza Flora Special School for the Deaf is located in Cluj-Napoca, Romania. It is the only school for the deaf in Romania that uses Hungarian as the language of instruction. Around 6% of Romania's population are ethnic Hungarians, which makes them Romania's largest minority. This school is an option for Hungarian families with deaf and hard of hearing children who want their children to learn in and study Hungarian. Similar to the Romanian-language deaf schools, the Kozmutza Flora school did not use Magyar jelnyelv (Hungarian Sign Language) as a language of instruction. Instead focusing on spoken and written Hungarian while students learned sign language from one another.
