= Languages of Moldova =

- Official: Romanian
- Minority: Russian, Gagauz, Bulgarian,
- Foreign: English
- Signed: Moldova Sign Language
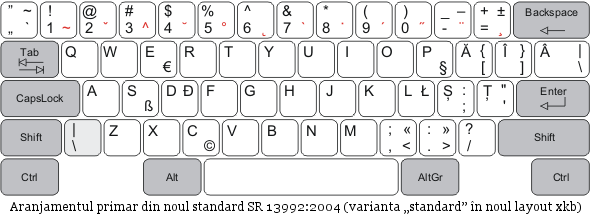
- Keyboard layout: Romanian keyboard layout

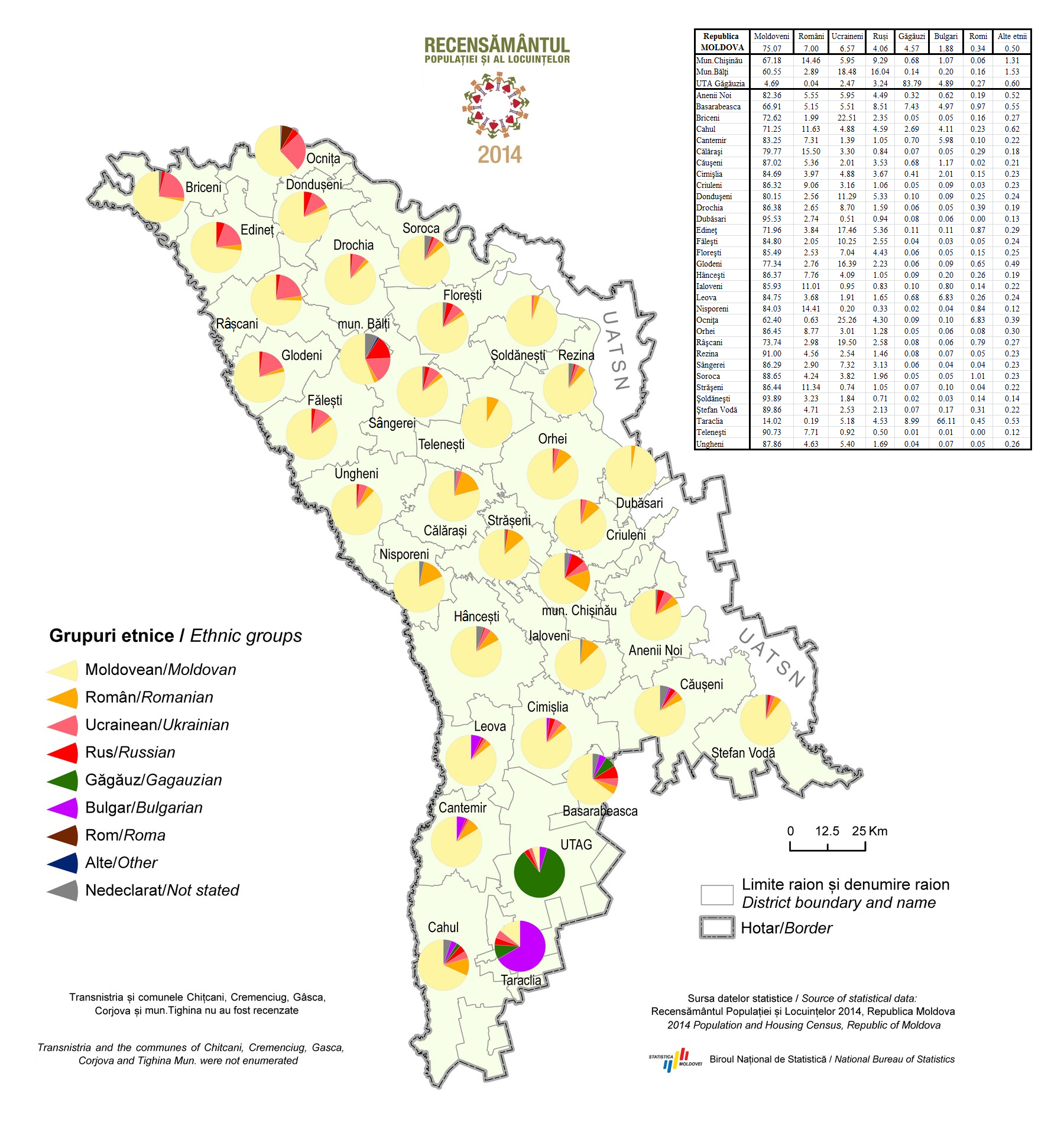
Major ethnics groups in Moldova according to the 2014 census

Romanian is the official language of the Republic of Moldova. The 1991 Declaration of Independence named the official language Romanian, and the Constitution of Moldova as originally adopted in 1994 named the state language of the country Moldovan. In December 2013, a decision of the Constitutional Court of Moldova ruled that the Declaration of Independence took precedence over the Constitution and the state language should be called Romanian. In 2023, the Moldovan parliament passed a law officially adopting the designation "Romanian" in all legal instruments, implementing the 2013 court decision.

Scholars agree that Moldovan and Romanian are the same language, with the glottonym "Moldovan" used in certain political contexts. It has been the sole official language since the adoption of the Law on State Language of the Moldavian SSR in 1989. This law mandates the use of Moldovan in all the political, economic, cultural and social spheres, as well as asserting the existence of a "linguistic Moldo-Romanian identity". It is also used in schools, mass media, education and in the colloquial speech and writing. Outside the political arena the language is most often called "Romanian". In the breakaway territory of Transnistria, it is co-official with Ukrainian and Russian.

In the 2014 census, out of the 2,804,801 people living in Moldova, 24% (652,394) stated Romanian as their most common language, whereas 56% stated Moldovan. While in the urban centers speakers are split evenly between the two names (with the capital Chișinău showing a strong preference for the name "Romanian", i.e. 3:2), in the countryside hardly a quarter of Romanian/Moldovan speakers indicated Romanian as their native language.

== Census data ==
Mother tongues in census history
	2004	2014	2024
Moldovan	60.0	56.9	49.2
Romanian	16.5	23.2	31.3
Russian	5.9	9.9	11.1
Gagauz	4.4	4.0	3.8
Ukrainian	8.3	4.0	2.9
Bulgarian	1.9	1.5	1.2
Romani / Gypsy	2.2	0.3	0.3
Other languages	1.0	0.2	0.2
Note: The table excludes the population who did not declare a mother tongue and the population in Transnistria.

== Official language ==
The 1989 state language law of the former Moldavian Soviet Socialist Republic declared that Moldovan, written in the Latin script, was the sole state language, intending it to serve as a primary means of communication among all citizens of the republic. The law speaks of a common Moldovan-Romanian linguistic identity. Until 1989 Moldova used the Cyrillic alphabet for writing a language that was, by that time, no different from standard Bucharest Romanian; in part of Moldova, the independent Pridnestrovian Moldavian Republic, the old script is still used in schools and on street signs. Even after shifting to the Latin alphabet, some Moldovan officials continue to insist that the designated "state language" is an east-Romance idiom somehow separate from Romanian.

In 1991, the Declaration of Independence of Moldova named the official language as Romanian.

At 9 September 1994, Academy of Sciences of Moldova confirms the reasoned scientific opinion of philologists from the Republic and abroad (approved by the decision of the Presidium of Academy of Science of Moldova of 9.09.94), according to which the correct name of the State language (official) of the Republic of Moldova is Romanian.

The 1994 Constitution of Moldova said that "the national language of the Republic of Moldova is Moldovan, and its writing is based on the Latin alphabet."

In December 2013, the Constitutional Court of Moldova ruled that the Declaration of Independence takes precedence over the Constitution, and the state language should be called "Romanian".

Most linguists consider literary Romanian and Moldovan to be identical, with the glottonym "Moldovan" used in certain political contexts. In 2003, the Communist government of Moldova adopted a political resolution on "National Political Conception," stating that one of its priorities was preservation of the Moldovan language. This was a continuation of Soviet-inflected political emphasis.

Since the Declaration of Independence in 1991, schools refer to this language as "Romanian" when teaching it or referring to it.

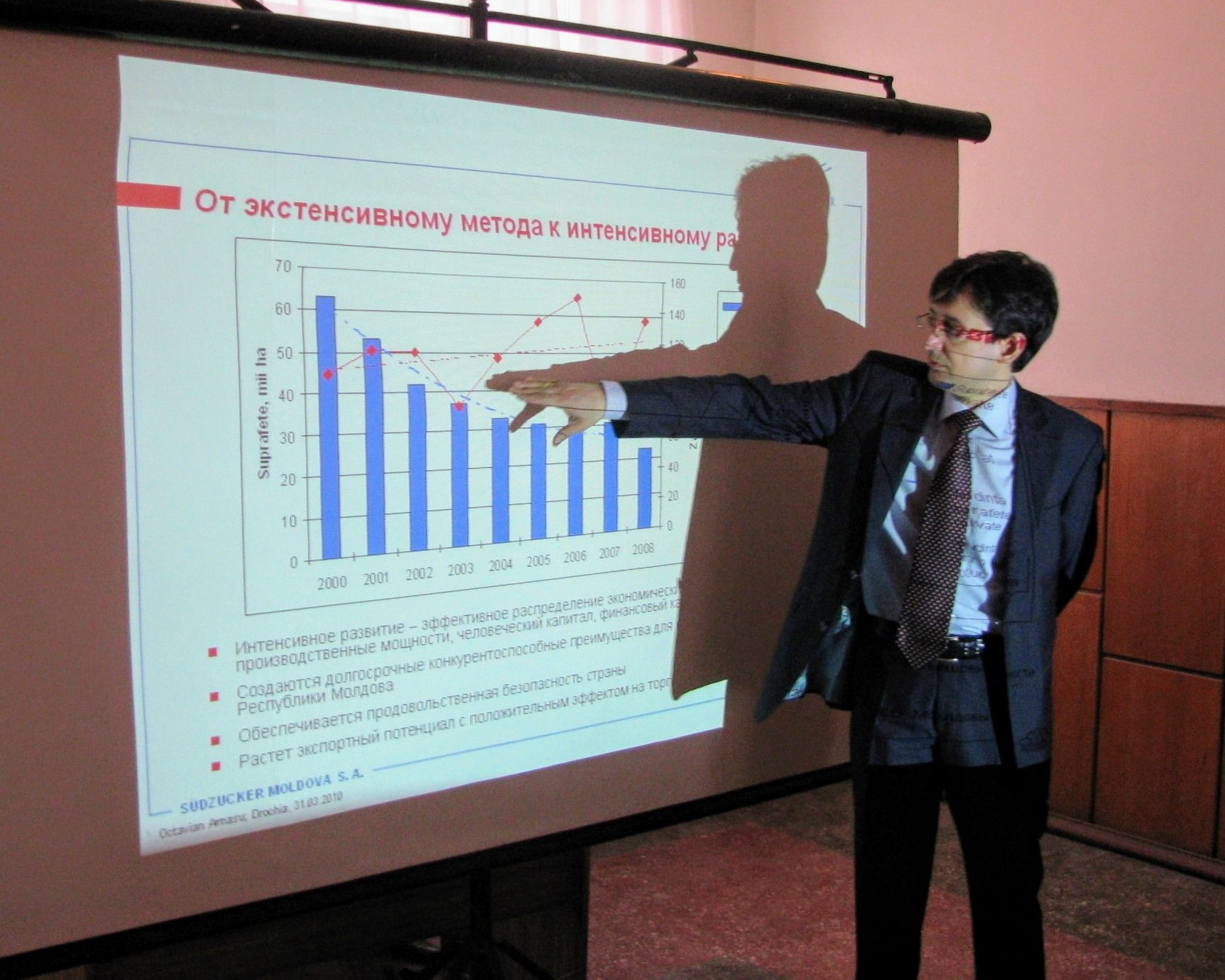
Octavian Armașu of Südzucker Moldova giving a presentation in Drochia in Russian, 2010. For various reasons linked to the Soviet era, Russian language usage remains widespread in Moldova

In the 2004 census, 2,564,542 people (75.8% of the population of the country) declared their native language as "Moldovan" or "Romanian"; 2,495,977 (73.8%) speak it as first language in daily use. Apart from being the first language of use for 94.5% of ethnic Moldovans and 97.6% of ethnic Romanians, the language is also spoken as primary by 5.8% of ethnic Russians, 7.7% of ethnic Ukrainians, 2.3% of ethnic Gagauz, 8.7% of ethnic Bulgarians, and 14.4% of other ethnic minorities.

The 2014 census reported an estimated 2,998,235 people (without Transnistria), out of which 2,804,801 were actually covered by the census. Among them, 2,068,068 or 73.7% declared themselves Moldovans and 192,800 or 6.9% Romanians. Some organisations like the Liberal party of Moldova have criticised the census results, claiming Romanians comprise 85% of the population and that census officials have pressured respondents to declare themselves Moldovans instead of Romanians and have purposefully failed to cover urban respondents who are more likely to declared themselves Romanians as opposed to Moldovans

According to the 2014 census, 2,720,377 answered to the question on "language usually used for communication". 2,138,964 people or 78.63% of the inhabitants of Moldova (proper) have Moldovan/Romanian as first language, of which 1,486,570 (53%) declared it Moldovan and 652,394 (23.3%) declared it Romanian.

Of the total population that declared its mother tongue (limba maternă; distinct from the usually spoken language) in the 2024 Moldovan census, 49.2% declared "Moldovan" and 31.3% declared Romanian, with both adding up to 80.5%. The share of the population that declared Romanian as its mother tongue increased by 8.1% compared to the 2014 census (23.2%), and the share that declared "Moldovan" decreased by 7.8% (56.9% in the 2014 census). Among other languages declared as mother tongues, Russian stood out with 11.1% of the population, followed by Gagauz with 3.8%, Ukrainian with 2.9%, Bulgarian with 1.2%, Romani/Gypsy with 0.3% and other languages with 0.2%.

In contrast, regarding the usually spoken language (limbă vorbită de obicei; distinct from the mother tongue) in 2024 Moldovan census, 46.0% declared it to be "Moldovan" and 33.2% declared it to be Romanian, with both adding up to 79.2%. The two had together an increase of 0.5% compared to the 2014 census, and there was a significant increase in the share of self-declared speakers of Romanian as their usually spoken language, of 9.5%, as well as a decrease in the share of the self-declared speakers of "Moldovan" as their usually spoken language, of 9%, compared to the 2014 census. In the 2024 census, the percentage of speakers of Russian as their usually spoken language was 15.3%, a 0.7% increase since 2014, with other minority languages' share being lower: 2.3% for Gagauz, 2% for Ukrainian, 0.8% for Bulgarian, 0.3% for Romani and 0.2% for other languages. Compared to 2014, there was a decrease in the share of Ukrainian, Gagauz and Bulgarian of 0.8%, 0.3% and 0.2%, respectively.

However, in Chișinău, the proportion of people who declared Romanian as opposed to Moldovan was larger - 43.3% vs 33% in 2014. According to the 2024 Moldovan census, in the capital Chișinău, the proportion was 28.8% for "Moldovan" and 47.9% for Romanian (adding up to 76.7%), 19.5% for Russian, 2.2% for Ukrainian, 0.4% for Gagauz, 0.4% for Bulgarian, 0.1% for Romani/Gypsy and 0.6% for other languages. Regarding the usually spoken language, in the same year, in Chișinău, the proportion was 26.1% for "Moldovan" and 49.1% for Romanian (adding up to 75.2%), 23.2% for Russian, 0.9% for Ukrainian, 0.1% for Gagauz and Bulgarian, 0% for Romani/Gypsy and 0.4% for other languages.

On March 2, 2023, the Moldovan parliament voted in the first reading to replace the phrase "Moldovan language" with "Romanian language" in all legislation of the country. The proposed law was introduced by a group of members of the "Action and Solidarity Party" fraction. Additionally, phrases such as "official language," "state language," and "mother tongue" will also be replaced. The authors of the proposal argue that this change is necessary to implement the constitutional considerations outlined in the decisions of the Constitutional Court, which declared that the state language of the Republic of Moldova is Romanian. The bill also proposes that the National Holiday "Our Language," as it is currently referred to, be renamed "Romanian Language." The proposal passed its first reading with 56 votes in favor.

== Official minority languages ==
=== Russian ===
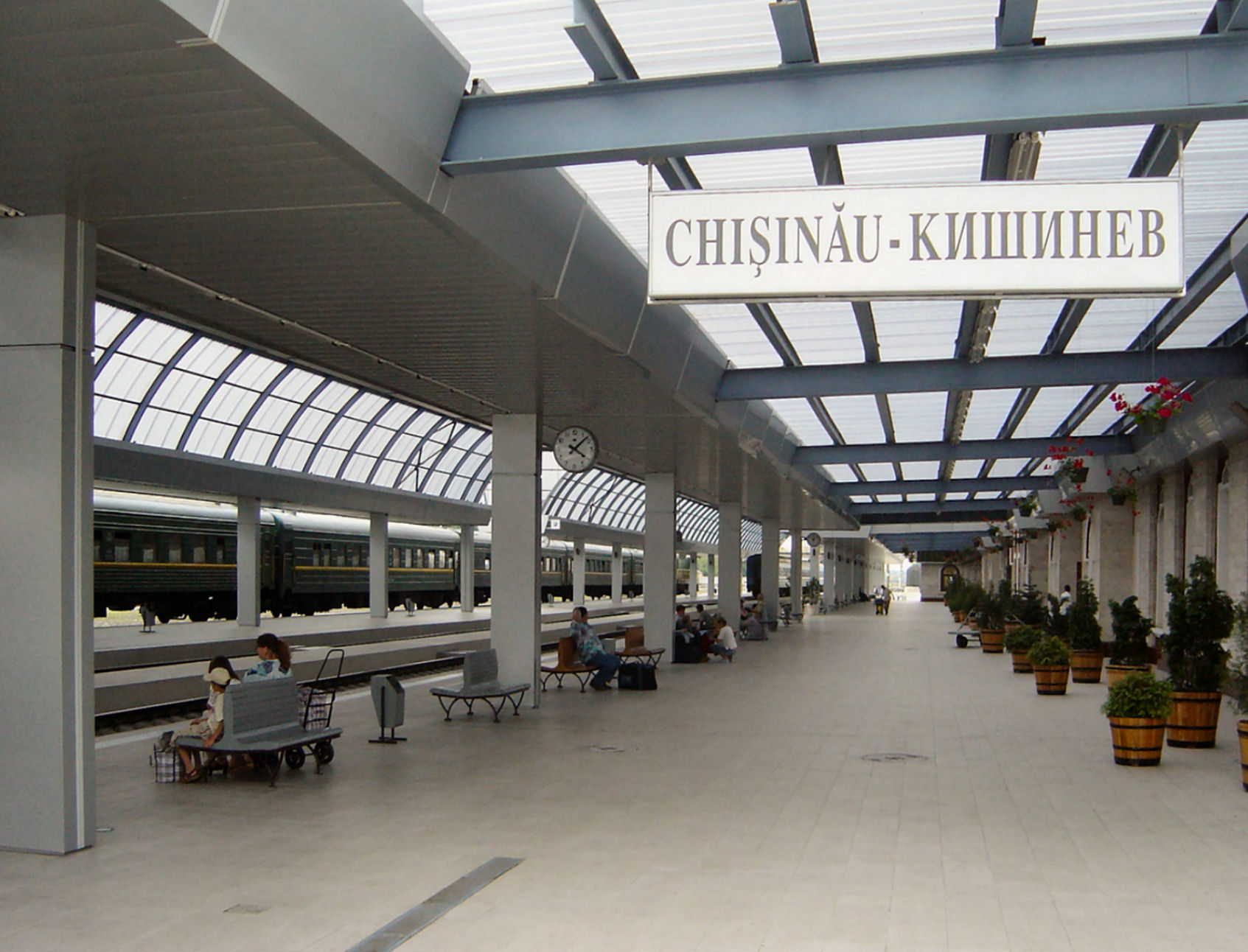
Bilingual sign at Chișinău railway station in 2005. The use of Ş instead of Ș is erroneous

The 2024 census showed that 11.1% of the population have Russian as a mother tongue. It is one of the minority languages recognized in Moldova, and since Soviet times remains widely used on many levels of the society and the state. A policy document adopted in 2003 by the Moldovan parliament considers that "for Moldova, Moldovan-Russian bilingualism is characteristic". On 21 January 2021 the Constitutional Court declared a law passed by parliament that would have made Russian the "language for communication between ethnic communities" unconstitutional.

== Sign languages ==
Moldova Sign Language is used by the local deaf community. It is not yet established if it is a distinct language or a dialect of the Russian Sign Language.

Romanian Sign Language and Russian Sign Language are used as well.

== See also ==
- 2004 Moldovan census
- 2014 Moldovan census
- 2024 Moldovan census
- Culture of Moldova
