= Esperanto in Bulgaria =

International auxiliary language in Bulgaria

Esperanto is a minor language in Bulgaria. It first arrived in Bulgaria in the late 19th-century. It was suppressed by the Nazi government in the 1940s and the Communist government in the 1950s.

== History ==
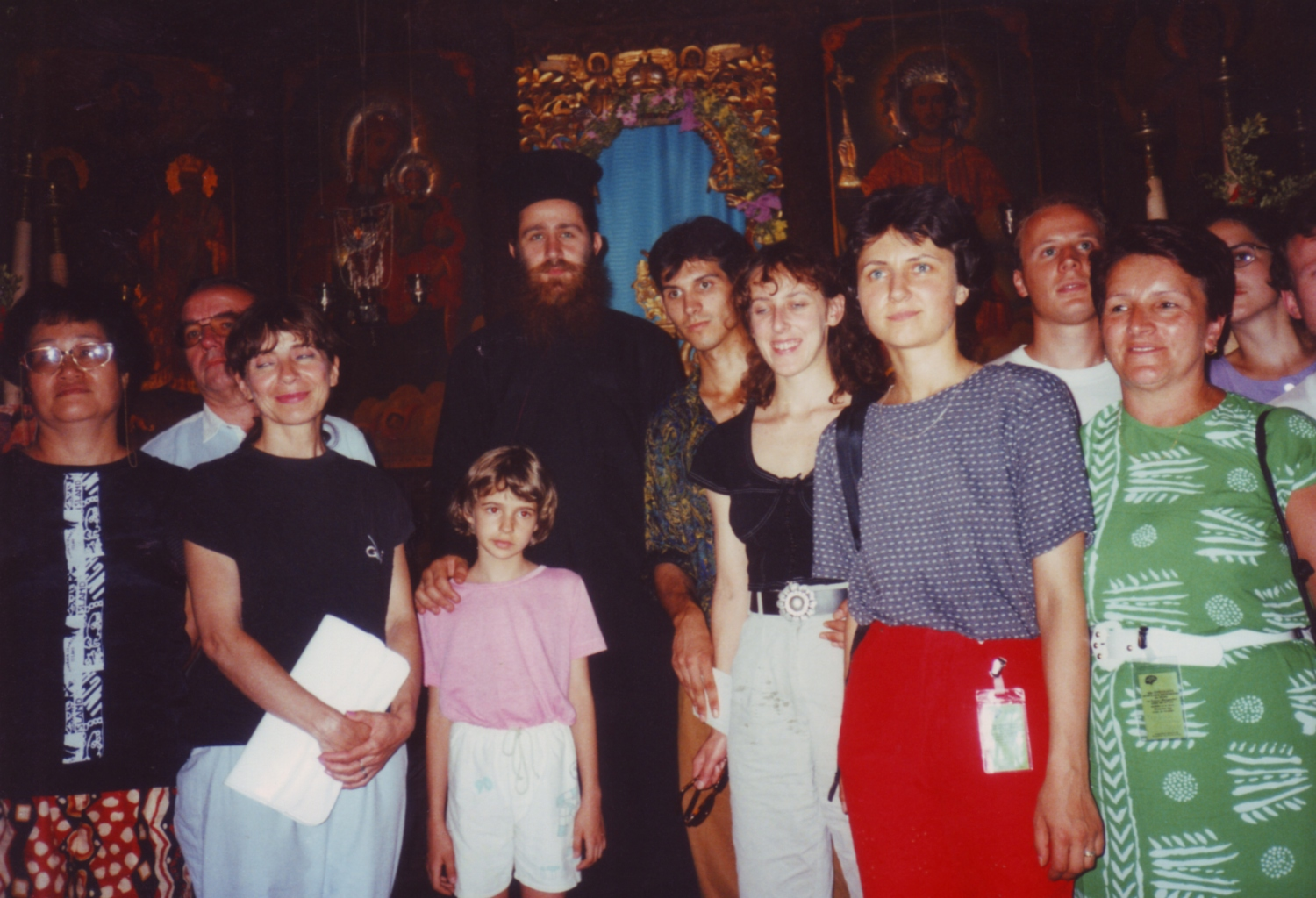
The International Youth Congress of Esperanto 1993 held in Bulgaria.

By the mid-1890s, there were two recorded Esperantists in Bulgaria. This number increased to 36 Esperantists in 1899 and to 81 Esperantists in 1904. In 1907, Bulgaria was the third country to develop a local Esperanto society after Germany and Russia. The group's periodical, the Bulgara Esperantisto, began print in 1919. By 1928, there were 1,744 recorded Esperantists in Bulgaria.

The Bulgarian Minister of Internal Affairs stated that Esperanto was a "Bolshevik language" in 1924 resulting in support for Esperanto among the Bulgarian socialist movement. The Bulgarian Minister of Education banned the use and instruction of Esperanto in schools in 1928, citing its simple structure as failing to challenge students, its promotion of internationalism over nationalism, and its use among "Bolshevists and anarchists". An island of the Danube was donated to the Bulgarian Esperanto community in 1934. During World War II, Esperantists were persecuted in Bulgaria under the Nazi-aligned government. Esperanto journalism and radio broadcasts were shut down in 1942.

When World War II ended, the Bulgarian Esperanto movement returned and aligned itself with Communism, and the Internacia Kulturo began publication in 1945. The Communist government changed its stance on Esperanto in 1949, and the Esperanto community was persecuted in Bulgaria as it was in some other Communist states. Esperanto journalism and radio broadcasts were again shut down in the early 1950s. The government determined that Esperanto was a distraction from the construction of a socialist society, and activities related to Esperanto in Bulgaria were effectively impossible.

The Bulgarian Esperanto movement was revived again in 1956 following the end of Stalinism in the Eastern Bloc, and a Bulgarian Esperanto Congress led by Ivo Borovečki was held in Sofia. In the late 1950s, a Bulgarian Esperantist theater troupe was created. The Nuntempa Bulgario illustrated monthly began publication in 1957. The World Esperanto Congress was held in Sofia in 1963, and it was held in Varna in 1978.

Since Januaro 1964 Sofia University has been the host for the Literature Circle under the guidance of Assen Grigorov, a talented poetry translator and the Nuntempa Bulgario editor. This activity resulted into many Bulgarian writers' masterpieces being translated into Bulgarian (Ivan Vazov and Aleko Konstantinov among others), a number of local Esperanto writers began publishing their original works in Esperanto.

== See also ==
- History of Esperanto
- Languages of Bulgaria

== Bibliography ==
- Forster, Peter G. (1982). The Esperanto Movement. ISBN 9789027933997.
- Lins, Ulrich (2016). Dangerous Language — Esperanto Under Hitler and Stalin. Palgrave Macmillan. ISBN 9781349715053.
- Lins, Ulrich (2017). Dangerous Language — Esperanto and the Decline of Stalinism. Palgrave Macmillan. ISBN 9781352000207.
