= SS La Touraine =

French ocean liner (1890–1923)

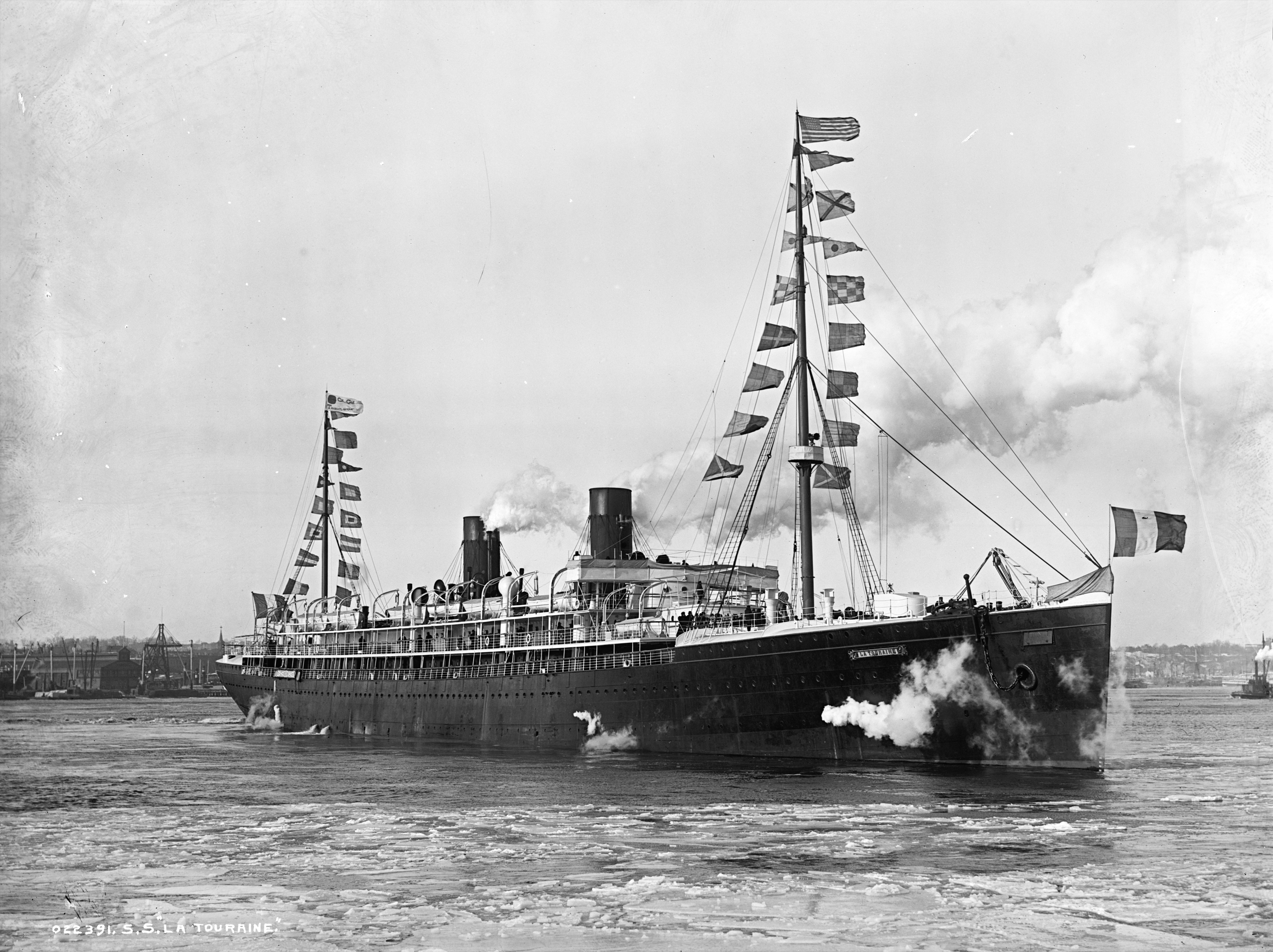
- SS La Touraine

History

France
- Name: SS La Touraine
- Namesake: former province of Touraine
- Owner: Compagnie Générale Transatlantique
- Builder: Chantiers de Penhoët, Saint-Nazaire, France
- Launched: 21 March 1890
- Maiden voyage: Le Havre–New York, 20 June 1891
- Fate: Scrapped October 1923

General characteristics
- Tonnage: 8,893 gross register tons (GRT); 8,429 GRT after 1902 refit
- Length: 158.55 m (520 ft 2 in) LBP
- Beam: 17.07 m (56 ft 0 in)
- Speed: 19 knots (35 km/h)
- Capacity: 1090 passengers (392 Saloon, 98 second class, 600 steerage)

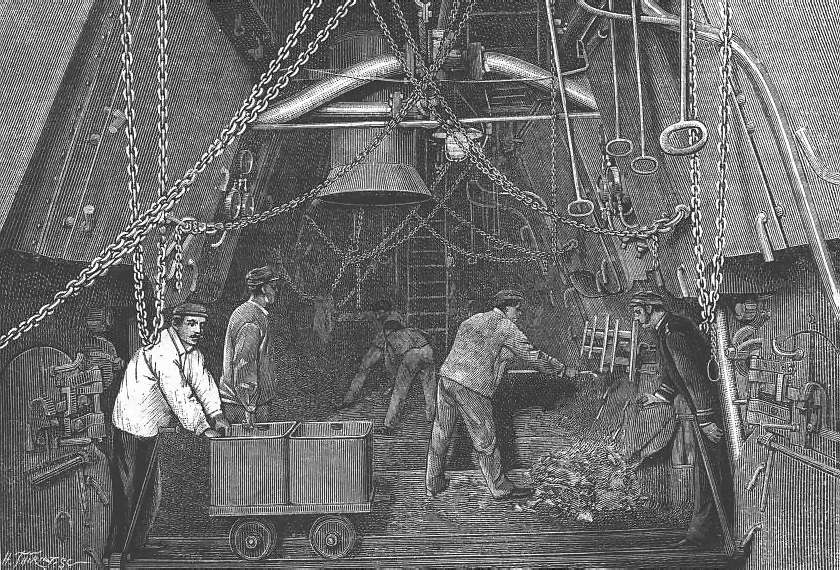
Boiler Room of La Touraine

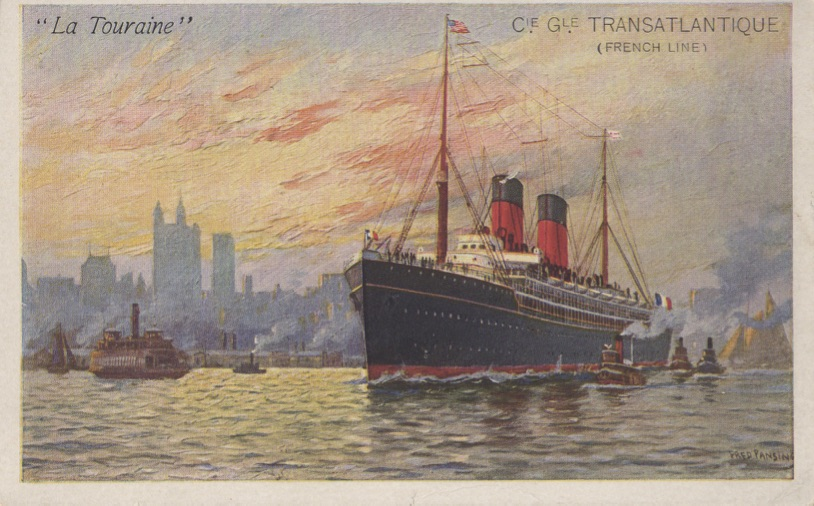
La Touraine leaving port

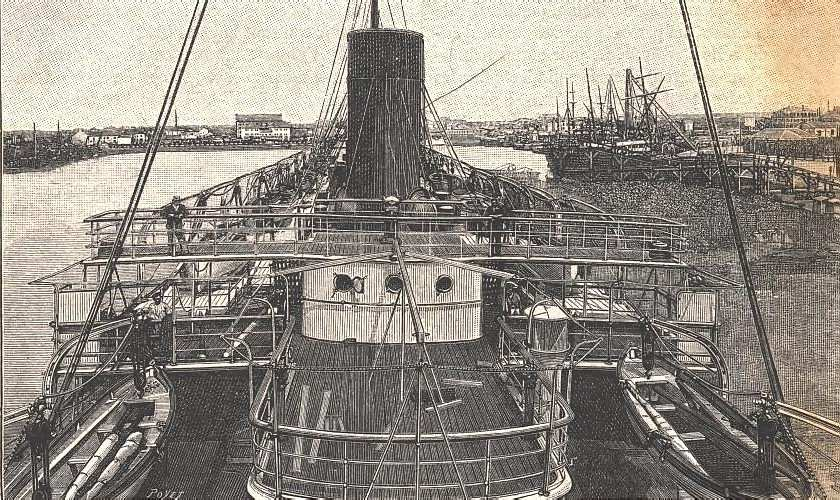
Bridge of La Touraine

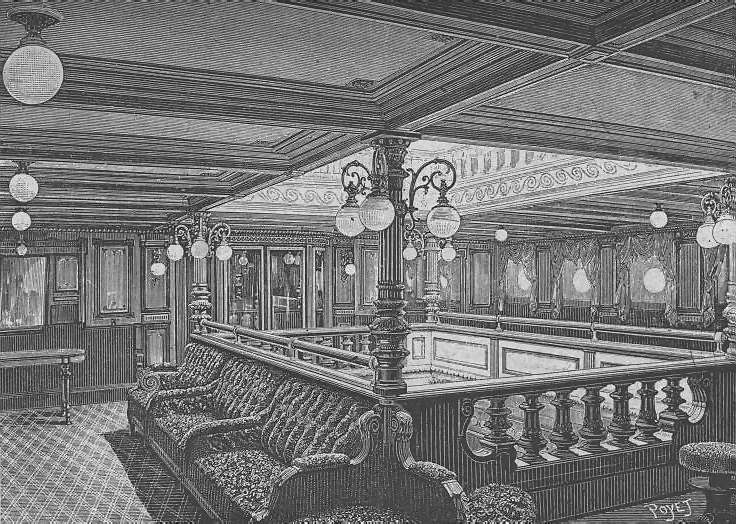
Ship's Interior

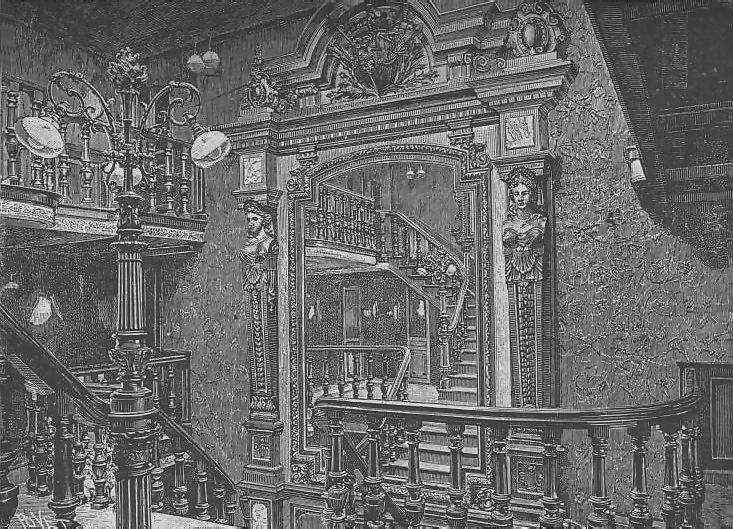
Grand Stair of La Touraine

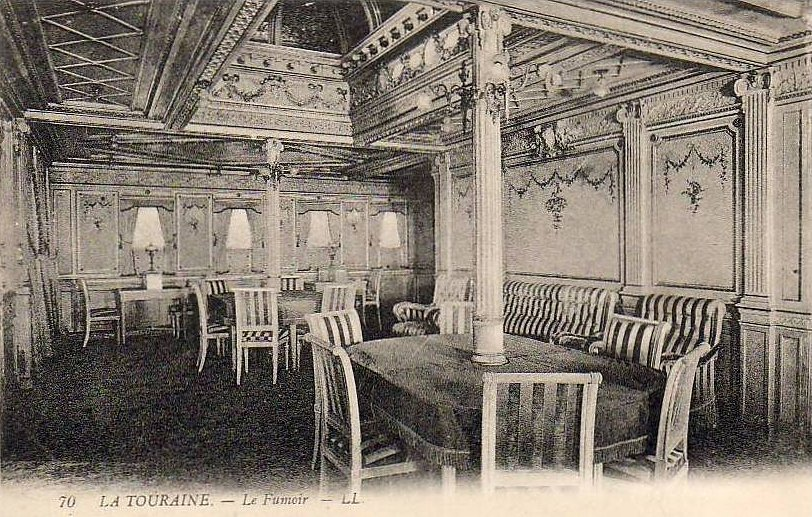
La Touraine Smoking Room

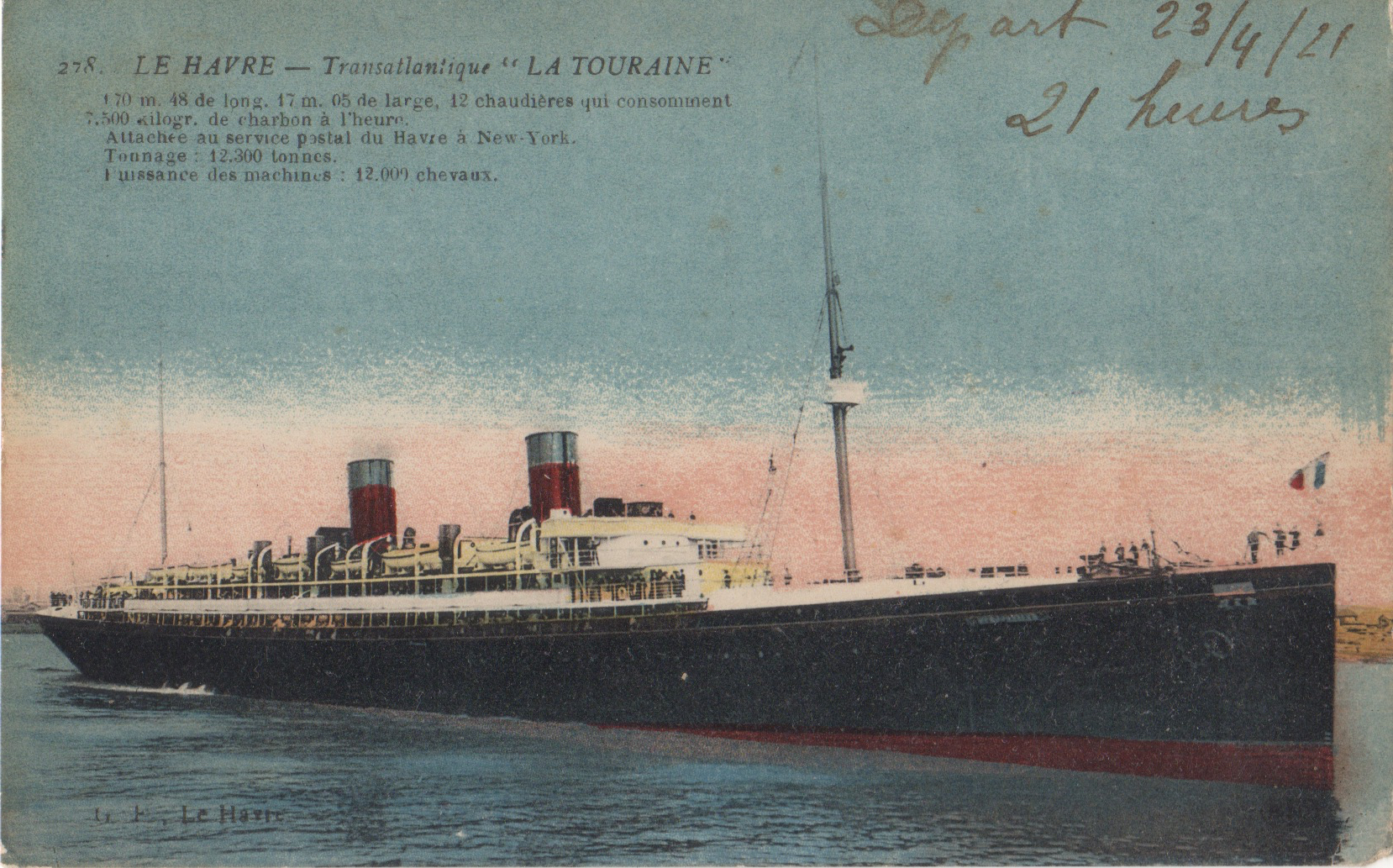
Colorized oblique photo postcard

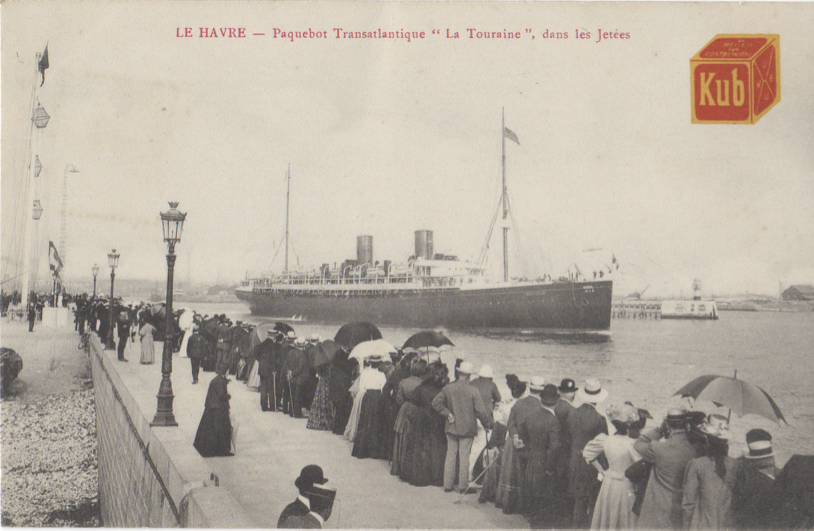
La Touraine leaving Le Havre.

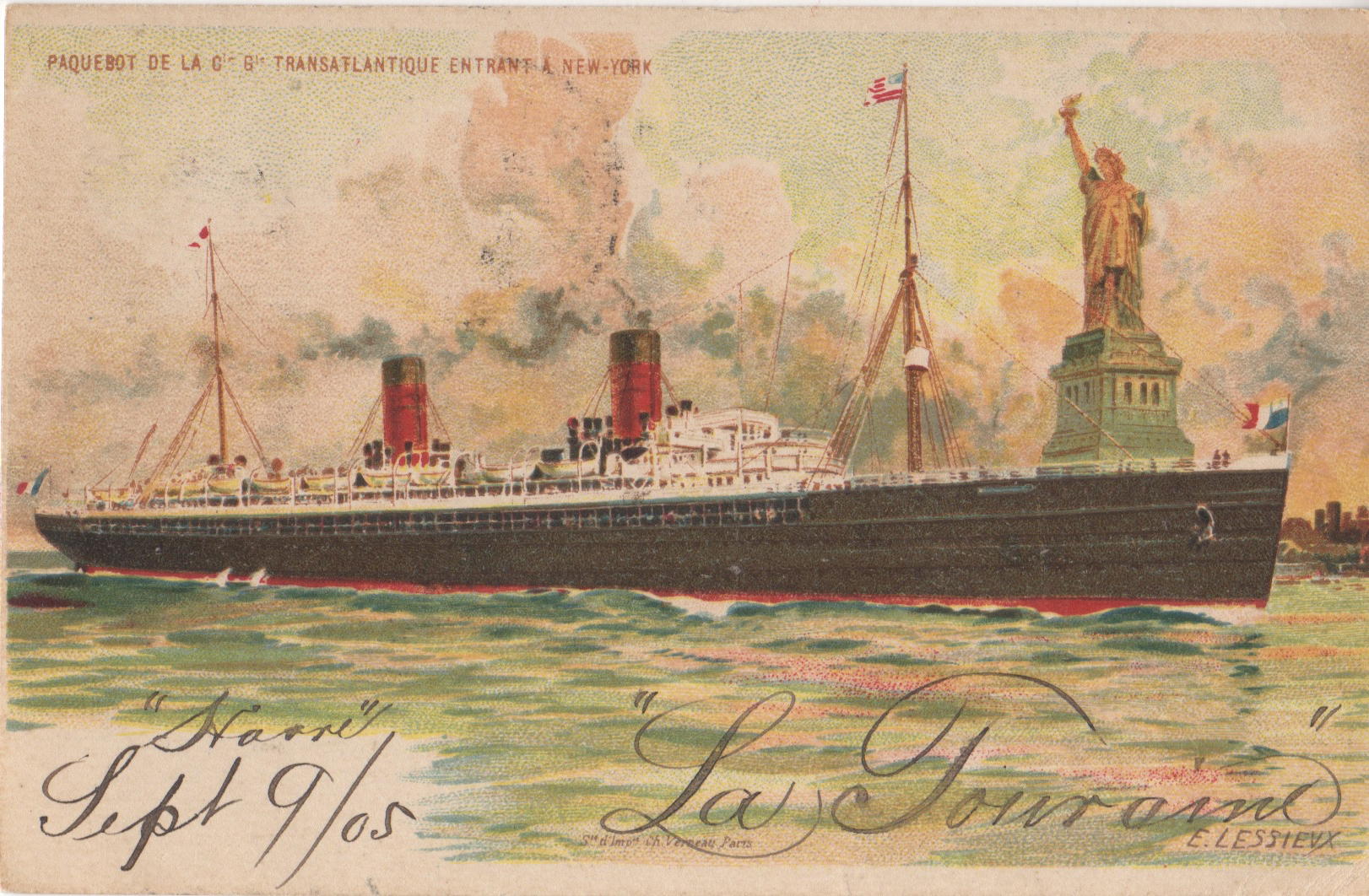
La Touraine passing the Statue of Liberty

SS La Touraine was an ocean liner that sailed for the Compagnie Générale Transatlantique from the 1890s to the 1920s. Built in France in 1891, she was primarily employed in transatlantic service on the North Atlantic. The liner was scrapped in Dunkirk in October 1923.

== Description ==
La Touraine was laid down by Chantiers de [null Penhoët] for Compagnie Générale Transatlantique in Saint-Nazaire and launched 21 March 1890. Built for France to New York service, she was the fifth-largest steamer in the world at the time of her launch, preceded by the Great Eastern, City of Paris, City of New York, Majestic, and Teutonic. She had a 8,893 gross register tons (GRT) and measured 158.55 metres (520 ft 2 in) long between perpendiculars, and was 17.07 metres (56 ft 0 in) wide. Equipped with twin triple-expansion steam engines driving two screw propellers that drove her at 19 knots (35 km/h), she was outfitted with two funnels and four masts.

La Touraine was equipped throughout with electric lighting, which was distributed by numerous circuits for redundancy and safety. La Touraine was initially equipped with accommodations for 392 first-class, 98 second-class, and 600 third-class passengers.

== Operational history ==
La Touraine sailed on her maiden voyage from Le Havre to New York on 20 June 1891 in just six days, seventeen hours, and thirty minutes. During a transatlantic crossing in July 1892, she achieved a record speed of 21.2 knots over the measured mile, although she was never a Blue Riband record holder.

In 1893, one of her passengers was Bulgarian writer Aleko Konstantinov and he described the journey in his book To Chicago and Back. In May 1898, La Touraine was departing New York Harbor when she ran down eight United States Army soldiers in a rowboat who were planting mines to defend against attack during the Spanish–American War. La Touraine did not stop or lower lifeboats; two soldiers drowned, while the other six, including Robert I. Rees, later a brigadier general, were rescued.

On 2 March 1900, La Touraine ran down the sailing trawler 'Briton' of Brixham, Devon, in the English Channel near the Eddystone light. The trawler's entire five man crew was lost.

From November 1900 to January 1902, La Touraine was refitted at Saint-Nazaire to 8,429 GRT. Her engines were overhauled, she had bilge keels installed, and two masts were removed. The bilge keels helped further stabilize the ship. As a result, La Touraine, was said to be "as smooth as an iron over a linen cloth." Her third-class passenger capacity was increased to 1,000. On 21 January 1903, La Touraine was damaged at Le Havre by a fire that destroyed her grand staircase, the first-class dining room, and her "de luxe" cabins, all of which were later rebuilt. In 1906, La Touraine was still on the New York route, sailing opposite La Savoie and La Lorraine. In 1910 her passenger capacity was reduced, accommodating 69 first-, 263 second-, and 686 third-class passengers. On April 12, 1912, while on a transatlantic voyage La Touraine was one of a number of ships that related wireless radio warnings about icebergs to the RMS Titanic shortly before that ship's now-famous collision with an iceberg.

In May 1913, she began sailing from Le Havre to Montreal via Quebec carrying only second- and third-class passengers. In October 1913, while still on this route, she was one of ten ocean liners that came to the aid of the stricken Uranium Line steamer Volturno that had caught fire. During the rescue efforts, La Touraine came within 15 feet (4.6 m) of colliding with the Red Star liner Kroonland, also participating in the rescue attempt. La Touraine began her fifth and final round trip on the Montreal run in June 1914.

At the outbreak of World War I, the French government took over many of CGT's liners—including La Touraine—for a variety of duties. During the war, the German government established an intelligence and sabotage operation within the United States. On July 30, 1916, this campaign carried out the sabotage of the Black Tom pier in Jersey City, New Jersey, destroying the munitions depot there and causing severe damage to numerous structures, including the Statue of Liberty and Ellis Island complex.

At some point after being released from government service, La Touraine resumed Le Havre–New York service and again carried first-class passengers, until March 1915. After the German invasion of France in April 1915, CGT shifted its base of operations to Bordeaux; La Touraine began Bordeaux–New York service at that time, remaining on that route until September 1919, when the end of the war allowed the resumption of departures from Le Havre. After resuming Le Havre–New York service, La Touraine carried cabin and third-class passengers only through her last voyage in September 1922. With the post-war boom in North Atlantic traffic over, CGT sold La Touraine. The liner was scrapped in Dunkirk in October 1923.

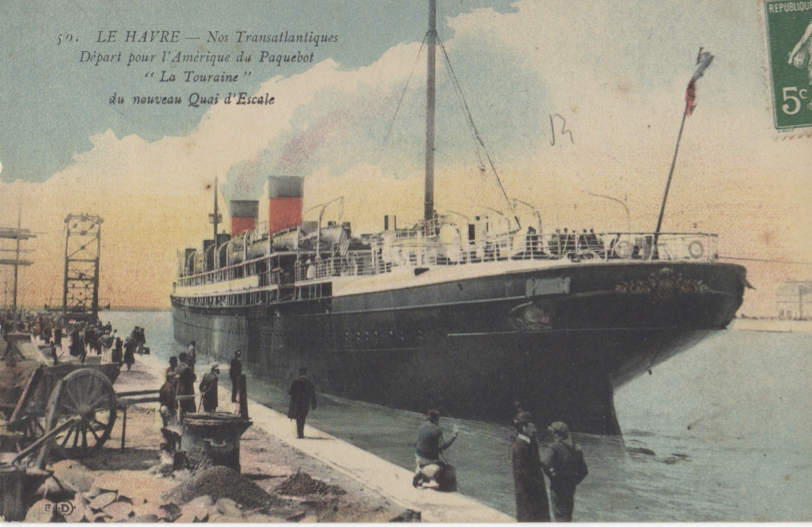
La Touraine dockside
