= Hungarian manual alphabet =

Alphabet for fingerspelling

The Hungarian Manual Alphabet (or a magyar ujjábécé in Hungarian) is used for fingerspelling in Hungarian Sign Language. The most common is the one-handed alphabet near the face, but an adapted LSF-style alphabet is sometimes employed.

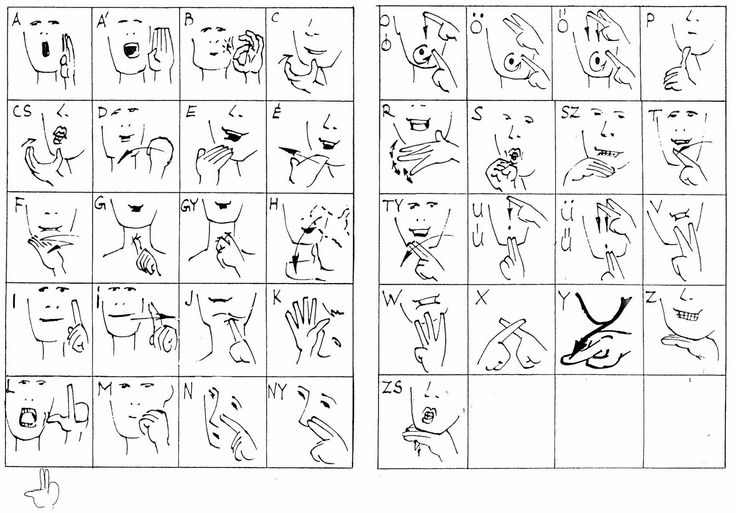
Hungarian manual alphabet primarily used.

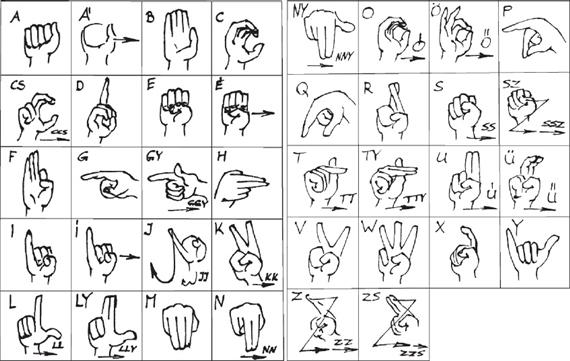
Alternate Hungarian manual alphabet inspired by LSF.
