= BQN =

BQN or bqn may refer to:

- BQN, the IATA and FAA LID code for Rafael Hernández Airport, Aguadilla, Puerto Rico
- bqn, the ISO 639-3 code for Bulgarian Sign Language, Bulgaria
- BQN, an array programming language
