= Languages of Hungary =

- Official: Hungarian
- Minority: Armenian, Boyash, Bulgarian, Croatian, German, Greek, Polish, Romani, Romanian, Rusyn, Serbian, Slovak, Slovenian, Ukrainian
- Foreign: English (40%); German (10%)
- Signed: Hungarian Sign Language
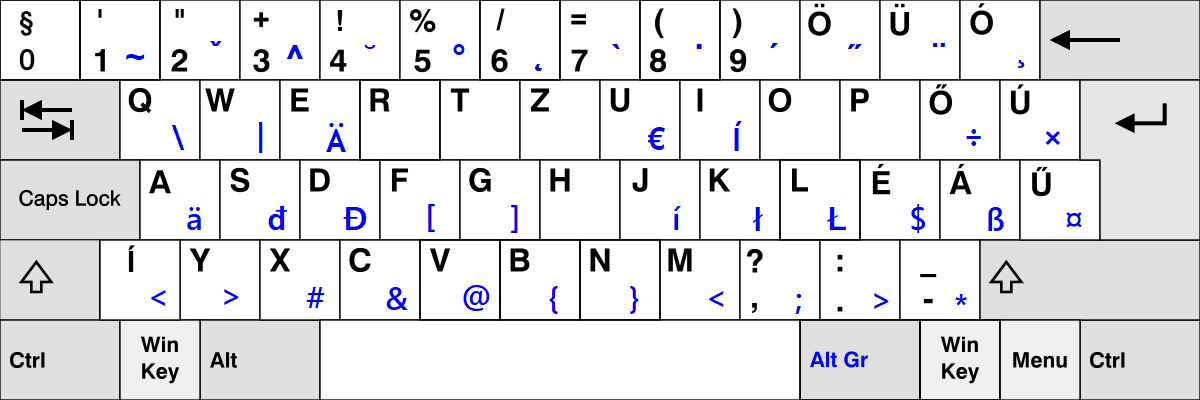
- Keyboard layout: Hungarian QWERTZ

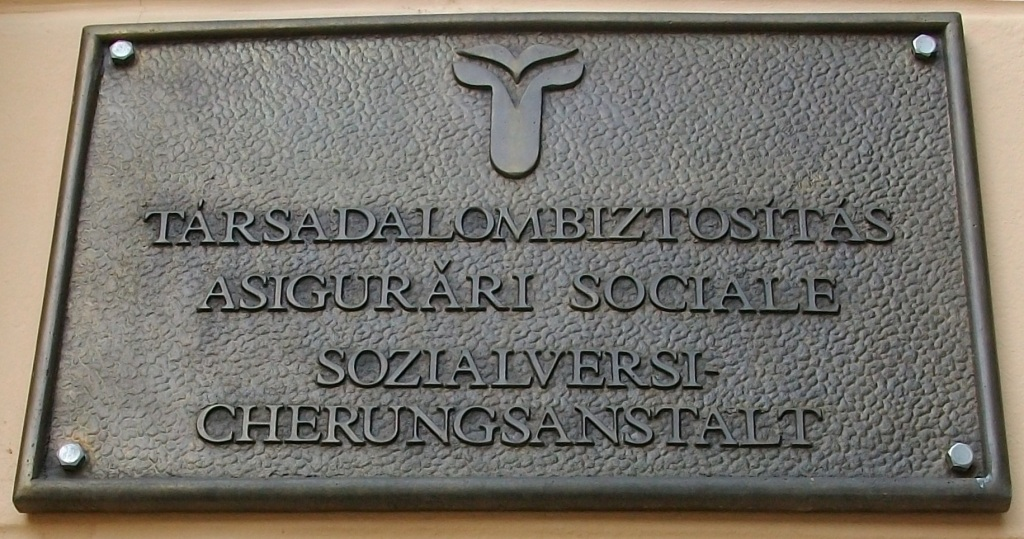
Trilingual (Hungarian, Romanian, German) table in Gyula (meaning "social health insurance")

The languages spoken in Hungary include Hungarian, recognized minority languages, and other languages.

== Minority languages of Hungary ==
Minority languages are spoken in a number of autochthonous settlements in Hungary. The country is a signatory of the European Charter for Regional or Minority Languages, which was ratified at 26 April 1995 under which 14 minority languages are recognized and protected. Official linguistic rights of 13 recognized minorities are regulated by the Act on the Rights of National and Ethnic Minorities, which provides measures for development of cultural and educational autonomy. Levels of linguistic assimilation among Hungarian ethnic minorities are high. At the time of 2001 Census, out of the 314,059 citizens belonging to ethnic minorities, 135,787 stated minority language as their primary language.

Under the terms of the European Charter for Regional or Minority Languages, Hungary is providing special protection for the Armenian, Boyash, Bulgarian, Croatian, German, Greek, Polish, Romani, Romanian, Rusyn, Serbian, Slovak, Slovenian and Ukrainian languages.

== Language families ==
Uralic languages

– Hungarian: The only official language of the country, unrelated to any of the neighbouring languages. It is the first language of some 98.9% of the total population.

Indo-European languages

– German: spoken by the German minority, especially in and around the Mecsek Mountains, but also in other parts of the country. (Historically, the Swabian German dialect was spoken in Hungary.)
– Slovak: spoken by the Slovak minority, especially in the North Hungarian Mountains and around Békéscsaba.
– Serbian: spoken by the Serbian minority, especially in and around Bácska, but also in other territories of Southern Hungary.
– Slovene: spoken by the Slovene minority, especially around the Slovenian border, Western Hungary.
– Croatian: spoken by the Croatian minority, especially in Southern Hungary.
– Romanian: spoken by the Romanian minority, especially in and around Gyula, Eastern Hungary.
– Armenian: spoken by the Armenian minority, by some 930 people as per the 2022 census.
– Romani: spoken by some members of the Roma minority throughout the country.

Turkic languages

– Cuman: once spoken in Cumania region in Hungary. It is a Kipchak language closely related to other Kipchak languages like Crimean Tatar. The last speaker died in 1777.
– Kipchak: once spoken in Eastern Europe which includes Hungary. It was the lingua franca of the Golden Horde-controlled areas. It is the ancestor of all Kipchak languages today, which also includes the extinct Cuman.

Sign languages

– Hungarian Sign Language: spoken by around 9,000 people. It belongs to the French Sign Language family.

== Population by knowledge of languages ==
Language	Number of speakers (2011)	Note
Hungarian	9,896,333 (99.6%)	The only official language of Hungary, of which 9,827,875 people (98.9%) speak it as a first language, while 68,458 people (0.7%) speak it as a second language.
English	1,589,180 (16.0%)	Foreign language
German	1,111,997 (11.2%)	Foreign language and co-official minority language
Russian	158,497 (1.6%)	Foreign language
Romanian	128,852 (1.3%)	Foreign language and co-official minority language
French	117,121 (1.2%)	Foreign language
Italian	80,837 (0.8%)	Foreign language

== See also ==
- Demographics of Hungary
