= Moldova Sign Language =

- Native to: Moldova
- Language family: French Sign: Moldova Sign Language

Language codes
- ISO 639-3: vsi
- Glottolog: mold1243

Moldova Sign Language (Romanian: Limbajul mimico-gestual din Republica Moldova, LMGRM) is used in the Republic of Moldova.

Education and sign language in Moldova has been influenced by Russia and the Soviet Union as well as by Romania. No established deaf education system is known to have had existed before the Soviet times. When Moldova was a part of the Soviet Union, deaf education was done in an oralist approach in line with the rest of the country, and the written and spoken Russian language was prioritized, even though most students' families primarily spoke and wrote the Romanian language (called Moldovan in the Soviet Union).

Since independence, deaf education has been influenced by both Russian Sign Language (RSL) and Romanian Sign Language (LSR), with a greater LSR influence in the west and a greater RSL influence in the east. In addition, fingerspelling may be based on written Russian in the east Moldova, and on written Romanian in the west.

Moldova Sign Language has a relatively high lexical similarity to Russian Sign Language, but there is evidence that they may be distinct languages rather than dialects; for instance in reports that Moldovan children need interpreters for Russian Sign Language.

== Bibliography ==
- Bickford, J. Albert (2005). The Signed Languages of Eastern Europe. SIL International and University of North Dakota. p. 45.
