= To Chicago and Back =

1894 book by Aleko Konstantinov

To Chicago and Back (Bulgarian: До Чикаго и назад, romanized: Do Chikago i nazad) is a travel book written by Bulgarian writer Aleko Konstantinov in 1894, describing his visit to the United States in order to see the World's Columbian Exposition in 1893. It was the first major book by the author, and together with Bay Ganyo they are considered to be his most notable works. A lot of the book is written in a humorous, satirical tone, with occasional more sober reflections.

== Context and Contents ==
Konstantinov had previous experience with travel abroad – he had visited the Exposition Universelle in Paris in 1889 and the General Land Centennial Exhibition in Prague in 1891. At the time, the Principality of Bulgaria had been free from the Ottoman Empire for less than 20 years, the country was still less developed than Western Europe and relatively few Bulgarians had had the chance to travel abroad.

The book starts in Paris, with the author and the group of friends who accompany him on the journey, taking a train to the port of Le Havre, where they board SS La Touraine to cross the Atlantic on board. On arriving in New York, he describes being underwhelmed by spotting the Statue of Liberty from the steamship. A customs clerk fails to understand the group's nationality, and when Bulgaria is pointed out to him on a map, he writes it down as Turkey, causing amusement and derision among the Bulgarians. They find accommodation in Broadway Central Hotel.

Most of the book describes his stay in the United States, especially Chicago, ⁣⁣but also talks about other sites such as Niagara Falls.

== Legacy ==
The title page of the book's first edition is depicted on the obverse of the Bulgarian 100 levs banknote, issued in 2003.

== Bibliography ==
- Konstantinov, Aleko. To Chicago and Back, Sofia: National Museum of Bulgarian Books and Polygraphy 2004 (in English). ISBN 954-9308-24-3.
