= Languages of Bulgaria =

- Official: Bulgarian
- Minority: Turkish, Romani
- Foreign: English (25%); Russian (23%); German (8%)
- Signed: Bulgarian Sign Language
- Keyboard layout: Bulgarian

The official language of Bulgaria is Bulgarian, which is spoken natively by 86.2% of the country's population. Other major languages are Turkish (8.8%), and Romani (3.9%) according to 2021 census. (Note: excluding undeclared population) Two main varieties of Romani language spoken in the country are Balkan Romani and Vlax Romani. There are smaller numbers of speakers of Armenian, Aromanian, Romanian, Crimean Tatar, Gagauz and Balkan Gagauz, Russian, Ukrainian, English and Macedonian. Bulgarian Sign Language has an estimated 37,000 signers.

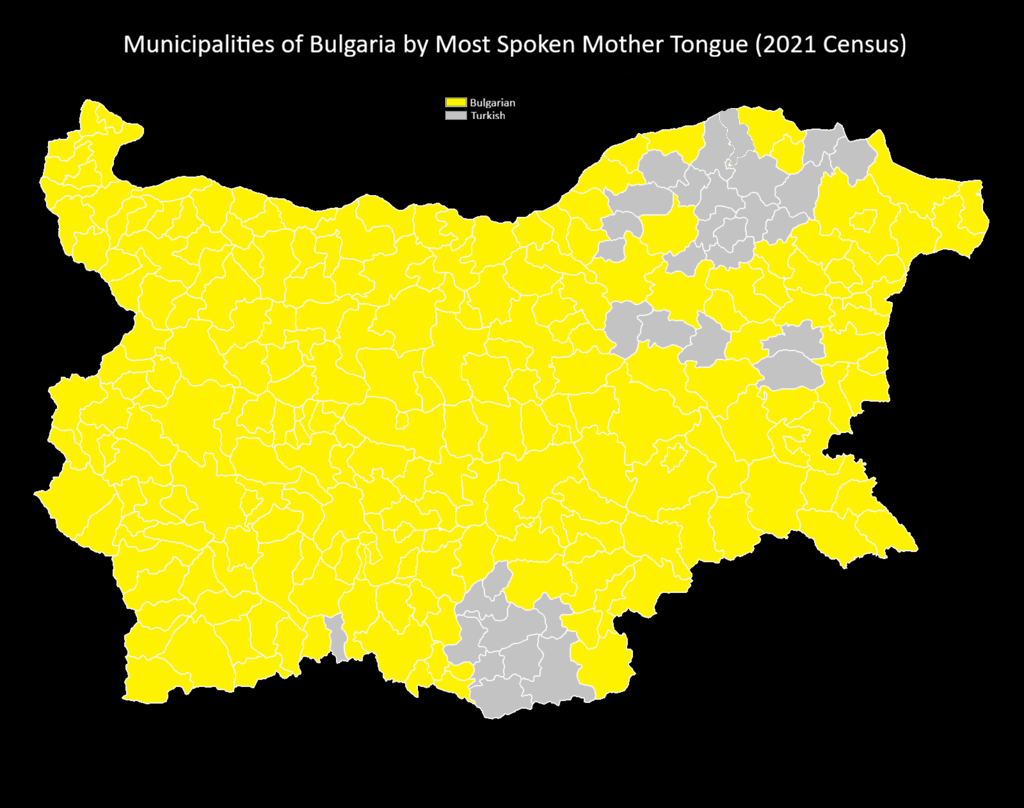
Majority Mother Tongue by Municipality in 2021 Census

Ethnicity map of Bulgaria

== 2011 Census ==
At the 2011 Census, the optional question about native language was answered by 6,640,000 respondents, or just over 90% of the total population.

Native language	Number of speakers	Percentage of respondents
Bulgarian	5,659,024	85.20%
Turkish	605,802	9.12%
Romani	281,217	4.23%
Russian	15,808	0.24%
Armenian	5,615	0.08%
Romanian	5,523	0.08%
Greek	3,224	0.05%
"Vlach" (Aromanian and Romanian)	1,826	0.03%
Ukrainian	1,755	0.03%
Macedonian	1,404	0.02%
Arabic	1,397	0.02%
Tatar	1,372	0.02%
Other	10,623	0.16%
Do not self-identify	47,564	0.72%
Total returns	6,642,154	100%
Total population	7,364,570	

== 2001 Census ==
The 2001 census defines an ethnic group as a "community of people, related to each other by origin and language, and close to each other by mode of life and culture"; and one's mother tongue as "the language a person speaks best and usually uses for communication in the family (household)".

Native Language	By ethnic group	Percentage	By first language	Percentage
Bulgarian	6,655,210	83.93%	6,997,000	88.46%
Turkish	746,660	9.42%	663,000	8.62%
Romani	370,910	4.67%	128,000	1.13%
Others	69,000	0.87%	71,000	0.89%
Total	7,928,900	100%	7,928,900	100%

== Bulgarian ==
Bulgarian is the country's only official language. It is spoken by the vast majority of the Bulgarian population and used at all levels of society. It is a Slavic language, and its closest relative is Macedonian.

Bulgarian is written with Cyrillic, which is also used by Russian, Ukrainian, Belarusian, Serbian and Macedonian.

== Minority languages ==
Turkish

The Turks constitute the largest minority group in the country. The Turks in Bulgaria are descendants of Turkic settlers who came from Anatolia across the narrows of the Dardanelles and the Bosporus following the Ottoman conquest of the Balkans in the late 14th and early 15th centuries, as well as Bulgarian converts to Islam who became Turkified during the centuries of Ottoman rule.

Roma

The Romani constitute the second largest minority group in the country. The Romani in Bulgaria are descendants of Romani nomadic migrants who came from India across the narrows of the Dardanelles and the Bosporus, in the late 13th century and following the Ottoman conquest of the Balkans in the late 14th and early 15th centuries, and also during the five centuries of Ottoman rule.

Other
Other minority languages spoken are Russian, Ukrainian, Armenian, Tatar, Greek, Romanian and Aromanian (the latter two often collectively referred to as "Vlach" in Bulgaria).

== Foreign languages ==
According to a Eurobarometer survey conducted in 2024, English was the most commonly known foreign language in Bulgaria (29% claimed workable knowledge of it), followed by Russian (14%), and German (5%). This is a decrease of 9 points for Russian since the previous survey in 2012. This is because many of the people who learned Russian at school are from an older generation and some are now deceased or as time has elapsed, have forgotten how to speak the language. When asked which two languages, other than their mother tongue, would be the most useful for children to learn in their future, an overwhelming majority of respondents said English (81%), with German coming second (20%), and Russian and Spanish jointly third (7% each).
