= Robert I. Rees =

US Army brigadier general (1871–1936)

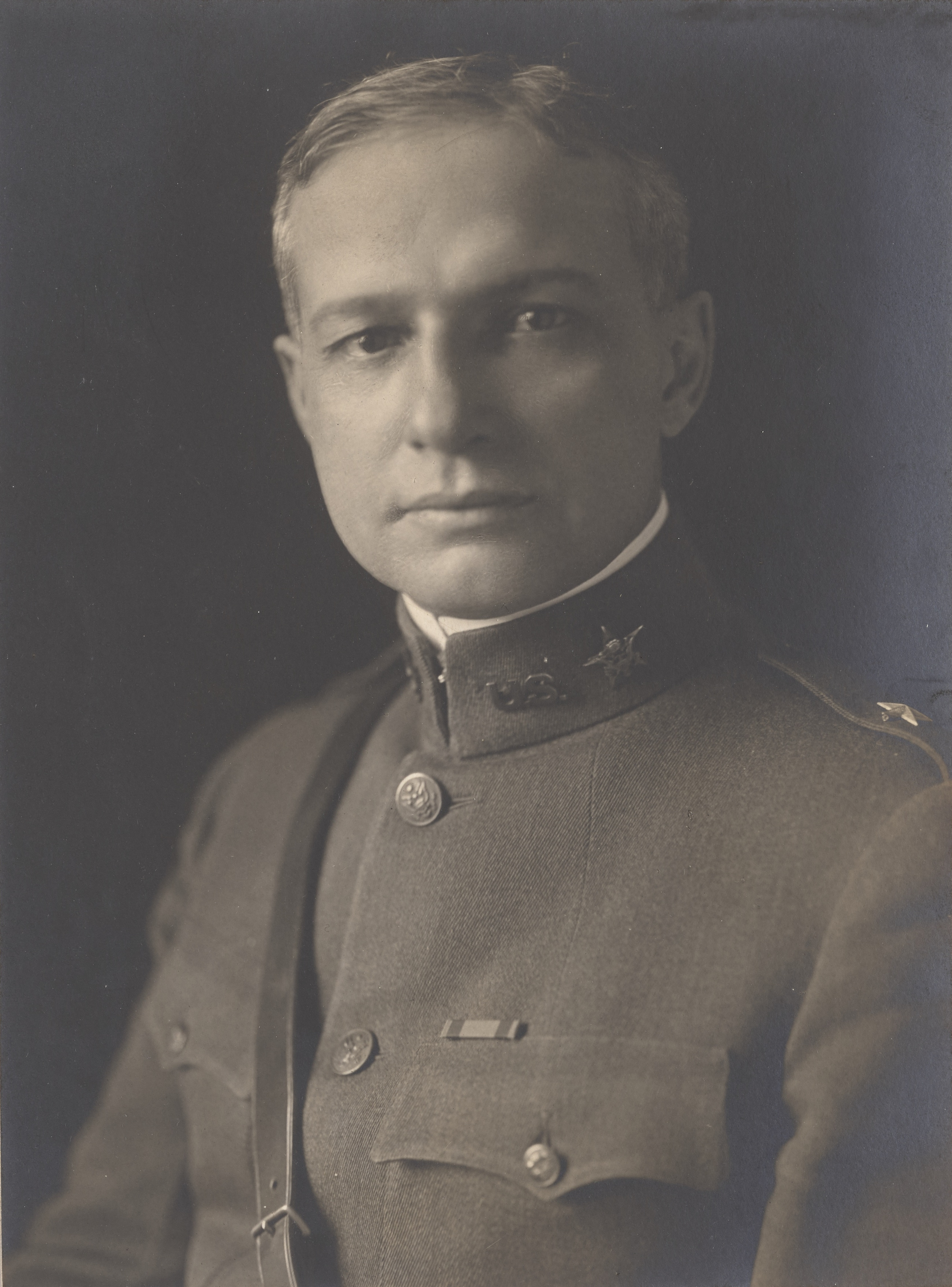
- Rees as a brigadier general in 1919
- Born: Robert Irwin Rees; 9 November 1871; Houghton, Michigan, U.S.
- Died: 23 November 1936 (aged 65); Detroit, Michigan, U.S.
- Burial place: Arlington National Cemetery
- Alma mater: Michigan Technological University; United States Army Command and General Staff College; United States Army War College
- Spouse: Sara Isabel Gannett (m. 1904–1936)
- Children: 1
- Relatives: Thomas H. Rees (brother)
- Military career
- Service: United States Army
- Service years: 1897–1924
- Rank: Brigadier General
- Service number: 0-991
- Unit: US Army Infantry Branch
- Commands: Company H, 3rd Infantry Regiment; Commandant of Cadets, University of St. Thomas; Student Army Training Corps; Education and Training Committee, United States Department of War; American Expeditionary Forces University; Education and Recreation Branch, United States Department of War
- Wars: Spanish–American War; Philippine–American War; World War I
- Awards: Army Distinguished Service Medal; Legion of Honor (Officer) (France)
- Other work: Telecommunications executive

Robert Irwin Rees (9 November 1871 – 23 November 1936) was a career officer in the United States Army and an American telecommunications executive. He served in the army from 1897 to 1924 and was a veteran of the Spanish–American War, Philippine–American War, and World War I. Rees attained the rank of brigadier general, and was a recipient of the Army Distinguished Service Medal and Officer of the French Legion of Honor.

A native of Houghton, Michigan and an 1895 graduate of Michigan Technological University, Rees enlisted in the United States Army in 1897 and served during the Spanish–American War. He received his commission in 1899 while serving in the Philippine–American War, and began his career as a member of the 3rd Infantry Regiment. He served at posts throughout the United States, and was a graduate of the Army School of the Line, United States Army Command and General Staff College, and United States Army War College.

Rees became known for his abilities as a trainer and educator; at the start of World War I, he organized and led the Student Army Training Corps. During the war, he chaired the United States Department of War's Education and Training Committee, which created training programs for soldiers and introduced vocational training in anticipation of discharged soldiers needing employment in a post-war economy. He subsequently served in France, where he organized and led the American Expeditionary Forces University, which provided education and training to soldiers prior to their discharges as a way to facilitate their return to the workforce after the war. Following his return to the United States, Rees was head of the War Department's Education and Recreation Branch and served as the U.S. veterans' bureau's assistant director for vocational rehabilitation.

Rees left the army in 1924 and became assistant vice president for personnel and public relations with the American Telephone and Telegraph Company. In November 1936, Rees tendered his resignation as of 1 December so he could accept a position with the American Engineers' Council for Professional Development. He experienced a cerebral hemorrhage while in Detroit on 18 November. He died in a Detroit hospital on 23 November and was buried at Arlington National Cemetery.

== Early life ==
Robert Irwin Rees was born in Houghton, Michigan on 9 November 1871, a son of Seth Rees and Eugenia (Livermore) Rees. Among his siblings was Thomas H. Rees, who also served as a US Army brigadier general. He was raised and educated in Houghton and was a graduate of Houghton High School. In 1895, he received the degrees of Bachelor of Science (B.S.) and Engineer of Mining (E.M.) from the Michigan College of Mines (now Michigan Technological University). He studied at Harvard University and New York Law School before deciding on a military career.

On 7 May 1897, Rees enlisted in the United States Army, joining Company B of the Battalion of Engineers as a corporal. The Spanish–American War started in April 1898, and Rees performed duties associated with defense of strategically valuable waterways. In May 1898, Rees was one of eight soldiers who were run down by the French ocean liner SS La Touraine while they were laying mines in New York Harbor. The ship was putting out to sea, and did not stop or lower life boats, resulting in the drowning of two men. The other six, including Rees, were rescued. In November 1899, Rees was performing Philippine–American War Engineer duties in Malate, Philippines when he was notified that his application for a commission had been approved. He was appointed a second lieutenant of Infantry, effective 25 October 1899.

== Start of career ==
Rees was initially assigned to the 3rd Infantry Regiment, and he continued to serve with his regiment in the Philippines. In February 1902, he led the effort that recovered the bodies of five soldiers from the 35th U.S. Volunteer Infantry, who had been ambushed in 1900 while providing an escort for a pro-U.S. local leader. After returning to the United States in 1903, he was posted to Kentucky, stationed first at Fort Thomas and later at West Point. Following his service in Kentucky, Rees was assigned to duty in Alaska Territory, where he initially served at Fort Liscum, then at Fort Egbert.

In June 1907, Rees was assigned to Fort Columbia, Washington, where he served as an instructor for joint army and National Guard coastal defense exercises. In the summer of 1908, he commanded Company H, 3rd Infantry during a temporary camp near Tacoma, Washington, where army units conducted extensive maneuvers and exercises to gain proficiency with Field Artillery gunnery and Infantry and Cavalry attacks and defenses. After returning to Fort Columbia later that year, he served as adjutant of the 3rd Infantry. In September 1909, Rees returned to the Philippines, where he served with the 3rd Infantry on the island of Jolo. In May 1912, Rees was posted to Fort Leavenworth, Kansas, where he was a student in the Army School of the Line. He completed the course in 1913, and was named a distinguished graduate.

== Continued career ==
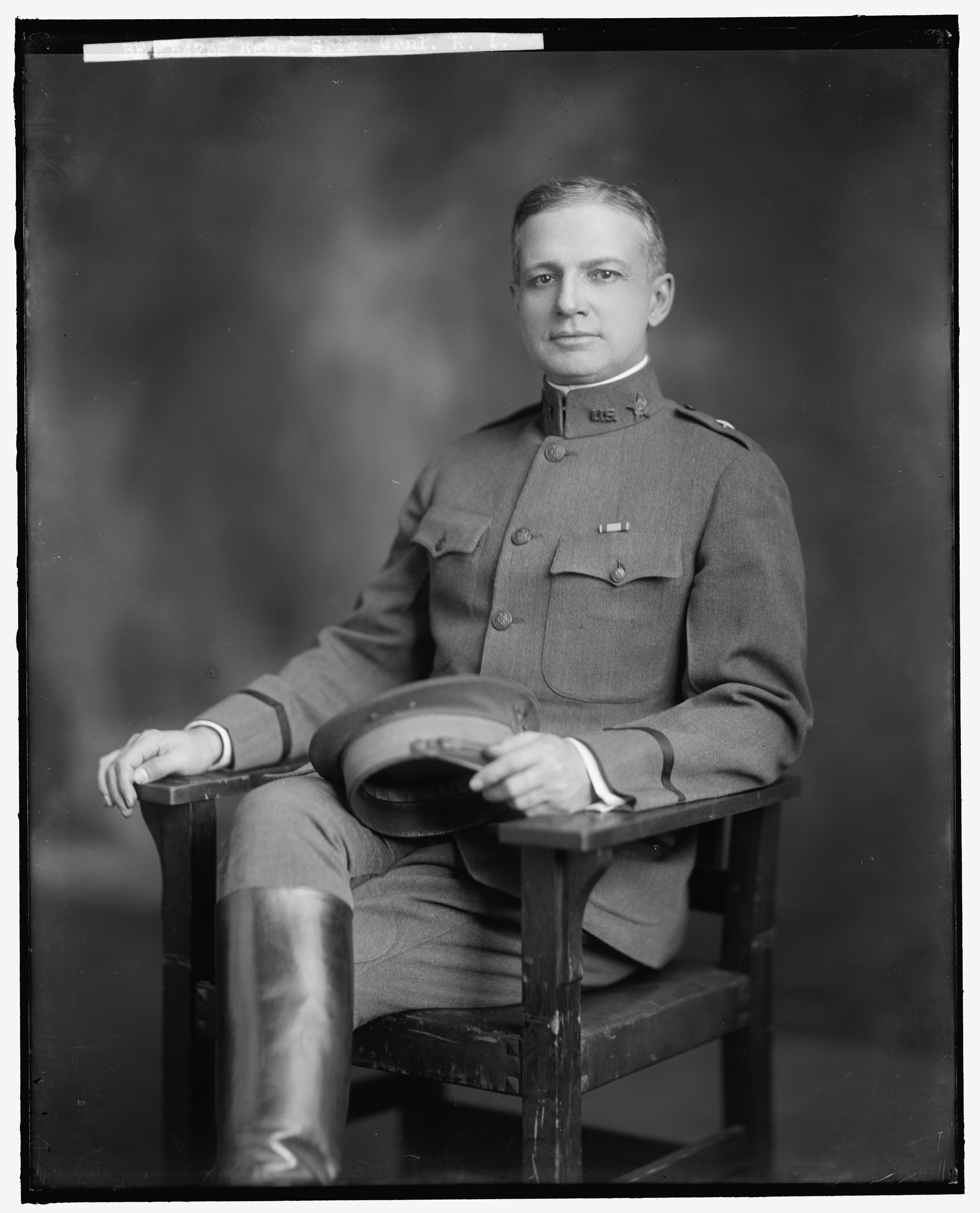
Rees during World War I

After completing the School of the Line, Rees remained at Fort Leavenworth to attend the United States Army Command and General Staff College, from which he graduated in 1914. After completing the Staff College course, he joined the 3rd Infantry at Madison Barracks, New York. In 1916, Rees was assigned as commandant of cadets and professor of military science at the University of St. Thomas in St. Paul, Minnesota. Soon after American entry into World War I in April 1917, Rees was assigned to the Army General Staff, first as a member of the War Plans Division, then as a member of the Operations Division. In these roles, he was appointed chairman of the War Department Committee On Education and Special Training, which created training programs for mechanics and technicians. This effort proved successful, and Rees went on to create the wartime Student Army Training Corps, which encouraged young men to receive military training while attending college.

Rees subsequently served in France, where he organized and headed the American Expeditionary Forces University, a wartime and post-war effort to provide college courses and vocational training to soldiers in order to facilitate their transition to jobs and careers in the post-war economy. After returning to the United States, Rees was assigned as chief of the education and recreation branch of the War Plans Division. In 1922, he was detailed to the U.S. veterans' bureau as assistant director in charge of vocational rehabilitation. Later that year he was enrolled as a student in the United States Army War College, from which he graduated in 1923. In 1924, Rees retired from the military so he could begin a civilian career as a telecommunications executive.

== Later career ==
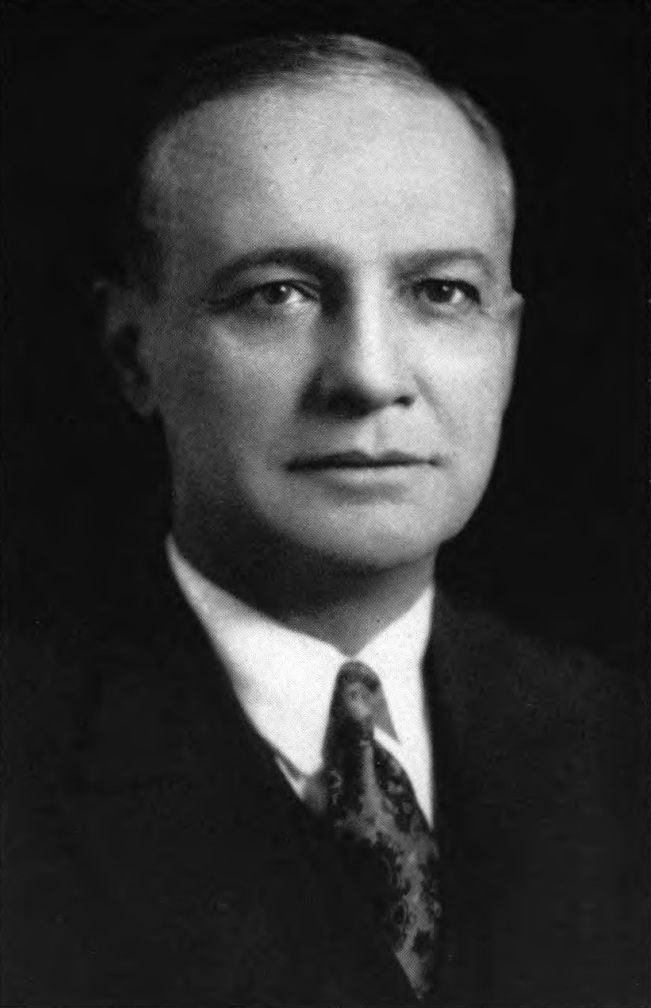
Rees, c. 1936

After leaving the army, Rees resided in New York City and joined the American Telephone and Telegraph Company as an assistant vice president. As head of the company's personnel and public relations departments, he had responsibility for employee development and manager training throughout the entire Bell Telephone System. He was a member of the American Association for Adult Education and the Society for the Promotion of Engineering Education and was the society's president from 1929 to 1930. In addition, he was active in the Association of Cooperative Colleges, the City Club of New York, the Machinery Club of New York, and the Engineers' Club. Rees was also a member of the Army and Navy Club of Washington, D.C.

Rees's additional activities and memberships included the American Association for the Advancement of Science, Academy of Political Science, and American Society of Mechanical Engineers. He was also prominent with the Corporation of the Polytechnic Institute of Brooklyn, Personnel Research Federation, and American Institute of Mining, Metallurgical, and Petroleum Engineers. In November 1936, Rees resigned from AT&T, effective December 1, so he could take a position with the American Engineers' Council for Professional Development. He experienced a cerebral hemorrhage on 18 November while in Detroit to address a meeting of Engineering Society of Detroit. He died in a Detroit hospital on 23 November. Rees's funeral was held at the Episcopal Church of the Ascension in Manhattan and he was buried at Arlington National Cemetery.

== Awards ==
For his First World War service, Rees was a recipient of the Army Distinguished Service Medal. In addition, he was named an Officer of the Legion of Honor by the government of France.

=== Distinguished Service Medal citation ===
The citation for Rees's Distinguished Service Medal read:

"For exceptionally meritorious and conspicuous service with the committee charged with education and special training in the Army. To his initiative and breadth of vision are largely due the successful measures for training of enlisted men for special services and the establishment of the Students' Army Training Corps."

Orders: War Department, General Orders No. 25 (1919)

=== Additional awards ===
Rees was awarded the honorary degree of Doctor of Engineering from Worcester Polytechnic Institute in 1930 and Michigan Technological University in 1933.

== Dates of rank ==
Rees's dates of rank were:

- Corporal, 7 May 1897
- Second Lieutenant, 25 October 1899
- First Lieutenant, 9 April 1901
- Captain, 11 March 1911
- Major (National Army), 5 August 1917
- Lieutenant Colonel (National Army), 5 August 1917
- Major, 18 September 1917
- Colonel (National Army), 27 July 1918
- Brigadier General (National Army), 1 October 1918
- Colonel (National Army), 6 August 1919
- Lieutenant Colonel, 1 July 1920
- Lieutenant Colonel (Retired), 26 February 1924
- Brigadier General (Retired), 21 June 1930

== Works by ==
- Personnel Management. New York: Alexander Hamilton Institute. 1930 – via HathiTrust.
