= Bay Ganyo =

Fictional character

Bay Ganyo (Bulgarian: Бай Ганьо, pronounced [ˈbaj ˈɡaɲo]; also transliterated as Bai Ganio or Baj Ganjo) is a fictional character created by the Bulgarian author Aleko Konstantinov (1863–1897). He is considered an exemplary image of an anti-hero: an uneducated, ignorant, egoistic and poor villager. Sometimes perceived as a stereotype of the uneducated, profit-driven Bulgarian and indeed the average Balkan person, he is often seen merely as a social stereotype, a member of the Principality of Bulgaria's newly formed lower middle-class.

The archetype of the fictional character was inspired by Ganyo Somov, a rose trader from Enina (a village in the Kazanlak municipality). At the international fair in Chicago in 1893, Aleko Konstantinov met Ganyo Somov and used him to create one of the most famous Bulgarian literature characters.

Bay is a Bulgarian honorary title to refer to older or more influential persons: the character's first name is Ganyo, and his family name has been attested as either Ganyo Somov or Ganyo Balkanski. Bay Ganyo is the protagonist of a novel-like series of satirical feuilletons by Aleko Konstantinov. The first part of the series tells of Bay Ganyo's journeys to various European cities and compares the character's culture to that of their residents. The second part satirizes the political problems of the day of the post-Liberation Bulgarian society in the late 19th century.

The character has been a subject of films picturing his adventures in Bulgaria and Western Europe which were largely based on the original literary work of Aleko Konstantinov. Konstantinov was inspired to create Bay Ganyo during a visit to Chicago's World's Columbian Exposition in 1893. Debuting in the cinemas in a silent short of 1922, Bay Ganyo was the subject of a full-length feature film by Ivan Nichev in 1991; the character was played by Georgi Kaloyanchev.

Bay Ganyo has been likened in importance and symbolism for the Bulgarians to Švejk for the Czechs, Tartarin of Tarascon for the French and Ostap Bender for the Russians.

== Feuilletons ==
The collection of feuilletons consists of two parts. Each feuilleton is presented by a different narrator, a member of a group of like-minded Bulgarians telling of Bay Ganyo's adventures; this group of narrators is itself a direct opposition to Bay Ganyo: they are educated, courteous and civilized people with European manners and clothing.

=== Bay Ganyo goes around Europe ===
The first part tells of the retail rose oil merchant Bay Ganyo's travels around Europe, seeking to sell his produce. The prototype of the character was a real person whom Konstantinov met during his journey to the United States described in To Chicago and Back. Bay Ganyo is compared to the residents of the countries he visits (Austria-Hungary, German Empire, Russia, Switzerland, etc.) to contrast him in a funny but unsympathetic way. Bay Ganyo is simple-minded, swindling, speculating and manipulating, yet tenacious, struggling and breaking-through.

- Beginning
- Bay Ganyo travels (through Budapest to Vienna)
- Bay Ganyo at the opera (in Vienna)
- Bay Ganyo at the public baths
- Bay Ganyo in Dresden
- Bay Ganyo at the Prague Exhibition (through Serbia to Prague)
- Bay Ganyo stays with Jireček
- Bay Ganyo on a visit (in Prague)
- Bay Ganyo in Switzerland
- Bay Ganyo in Russia

=== Political feuilletons ===
The second part consists of several independent feuilletons and deals with the new major middle-class and Bulgaria's political life. Bay Ganyo is not a petty rose oil dealer anymore, but a big-time politician who writes a petition to the Prince, runs for National Assembly of Bulgaria member, issues a political newspaper. Instead of working alone as in the first part, Bay Ganyo is the leader of a group of like-minded people propelled by mean acts.

- Bay Ganyo comes back from Europe
- Bay Ganyo organizes elections
- Bay Ganyo is a journalist
- Bay Ganyo at the palace
- Bay Ganyo in the deputation
- Bay Ganyo and the opposition — no way
- Association of Teetotalism
- Letter from Bay Ganyo to Konstantin Velichkov
- Out of Bay Ganyo Balkanski's correspondence
