= Radilovo =

Radilovo Радилово
- Village
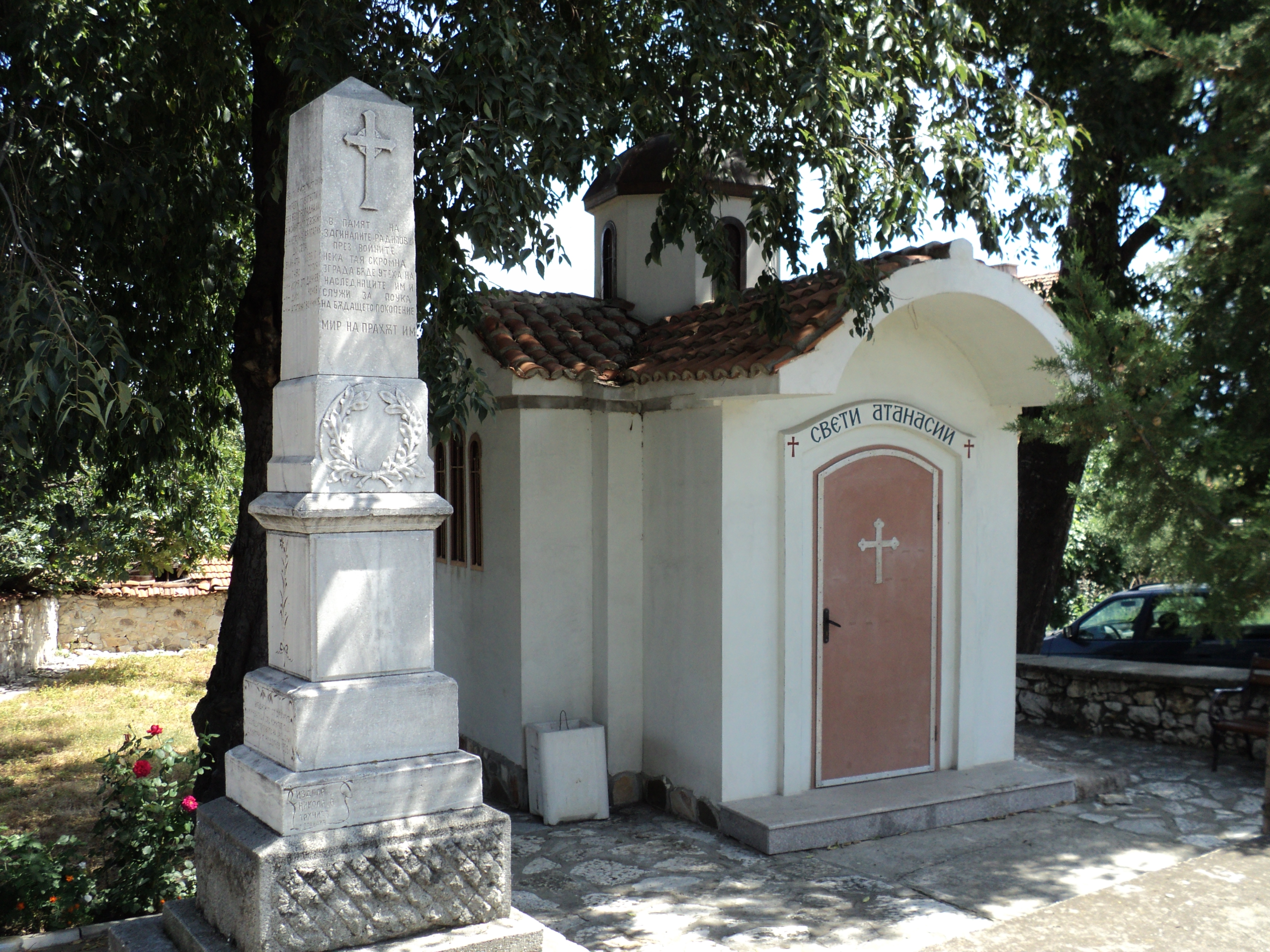

- Location of Radilovo
- Coordinates: 42°05′N 24°18′E
- Country: Bulgaria
- Provinces (Oblast): Pazardzhik Province

Government
  - Mayor: Yordan Koev (Ind.)

Area
  - Total: 45.183 km^{2} (17.445 sq mi)
- Elevation: 406 m (1,332 ft)

Population (2007-01-01)
  - Total: 1,537
  - Density: 34.02/km^{2} (88.10/sq mi)
- Time zone: UTC+2 (EET)
  - Summer (DST): UTC+3 (EEST)
- Postal Code: 4590

Radilovo (Bulgarian: Радилово) is a village in the municipality of Peshtera, Pazardzhik Province in western Bulgaria. It has a population of 1537.

Radilovo is situated in the foothills of the Rhodope Mountains, at 14 km to the south of Pazardzhik, on the main road from Pazardzhik to Batak via Peshtera. The village is divided into two parts by the river Dzhurkovitsa - Starata mahala (The Old neighbourhood) to the north and Novata mahala (The New neighbourhood) to the south.

In 1876 Lady Strangford arrived from Britain with relief for the people of Bulgaria following the massacres that followed the April Uprising. She built a hospital at Batak and eventually other hospitals were built at Karlovo, Panagiurishte, Perushtitsa, Petrich and here at Radilovo.

== Gallery ==
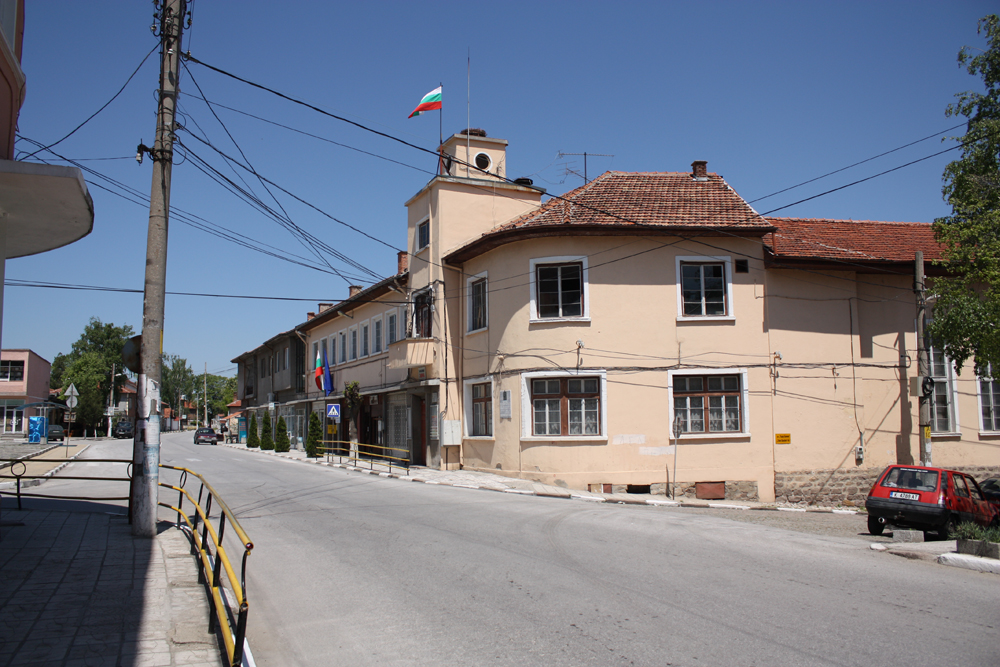
Radilovo Municipal hall

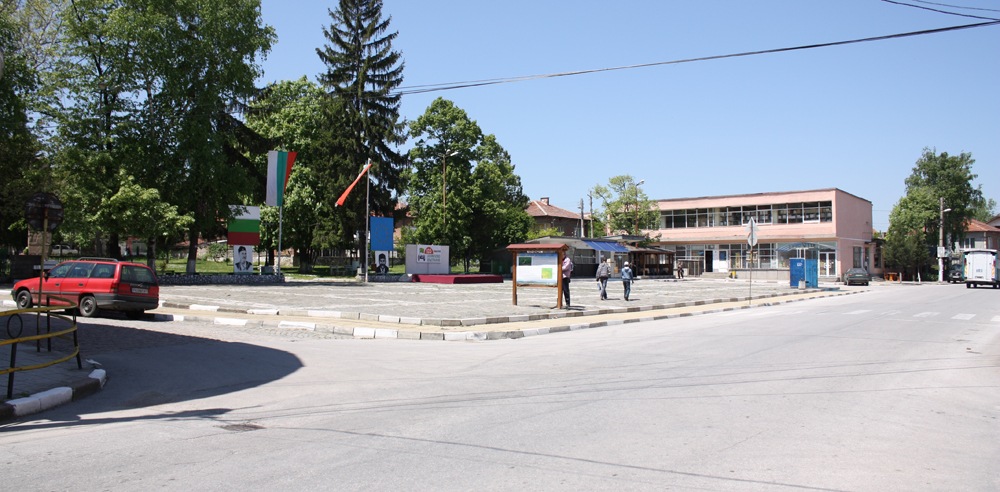
Radilovo main square

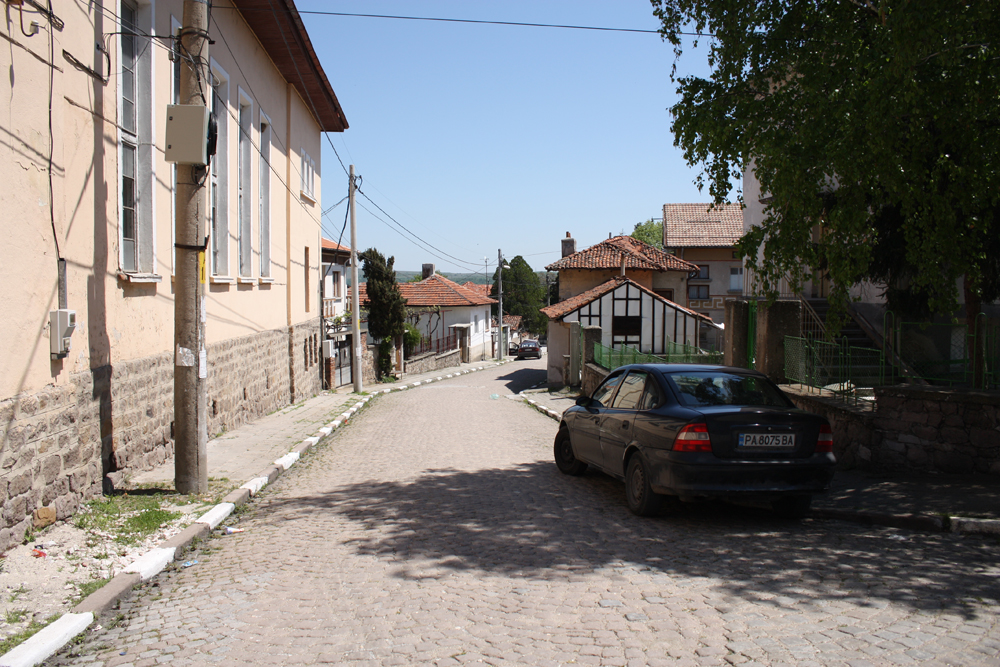
A street in Radilovo
