= Aleko Konstantinov =

Bulgarian writer (1863–1897)

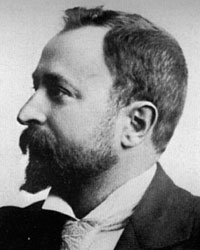
- Born: 1 January 1863 O.S. Svishtov, Ottoman Empire, now Bulgaria
- Died: 11 May 1897 (aged 34) O.S. near Radilovo, Bulgaria
- Resting place: Central Sofia Cemetery; 42°42′47.3″N 023°20′02.5″E
- Occupations: Writer, Lawyer
- Writing career
- Notable works: To Chicago and Back, Bay Ganyo, "Mirror"

Aleko Konstantinov (Bulgarian: Алеко Константинов) (1 January 1863 – 11 May 1897) (NS: 13 January 1863 – 23 May 1897) was a Bulgarian writer, best known for his character Bay Ganyo, one of the most popular characters in Bulgarian fiction.

== Life and career ==
Born to an affluent trader in the Danube River town of Svishtov, he attended the Faculty of Law of Odessa University (formerly the Imperial Novorossiya University), graduating in 1885. He worked as a lawyer in Sofia before embarking on a career as a writer. His first novel, organized as a collection of short stories, Bay Ganyo (translating to uncle Ganyo), describes the travels of an itinerant peddler of rose oil and rugs through Western Europe. Though impertinent and clumsy, Bay Ganyo proves to be ingenious and is considered by some scholars to be a mirror for a modernizing Bulgaria. The character is believed to be based on a Karlovo tradesman, Ganyo Somov.

Konstantinov, a cosmopolitan traveler, was the first Bulgarian to write about his visits to Western Europe and America. His visits to the World Exhibitions in Paris in 1889, Prague in 1891 and Chicago in 1893 – including a visit to Niagara Falls – provided Bulgarian readers, who had recently gained independence from nearly 500 years of Turkish Ottoman oppression, with a portrait of the developed world. To Chicago and Back (where Bay Ganyo appears again), his travel notes from his American trip, spurred a lasting interest in Chicago, which today boasts the largest concentration of Bulgarian immigrants in the United States. There is a bust of the writer in the University of Chicago's Regenstein Library and a section of Irving Park Road in Chicago is named after him.

He was assassinated in 1897 near Radilovo while traveling to Peshtera, most likely by mistake with the intended target being his friend (a local politician), with whom he had changed places in their coach shortly before the fatal shot. However, there exists also a version that his essays, exposing the hidden insidious intentions of the rulers of his day, led to his assassination.

Aleko Konstantinov is believed to have initiated the tourist movement in Bulgaria. Two of Vitosha's hotels are named after him – "Aleko" and "Shtastlivetsa" ("The Happy Man", the nickname he gave to himself in one of his short stories).

Konstantinov is portrayed on the obverse of the Bulgarian 100 levs banknote, issued in 2003.

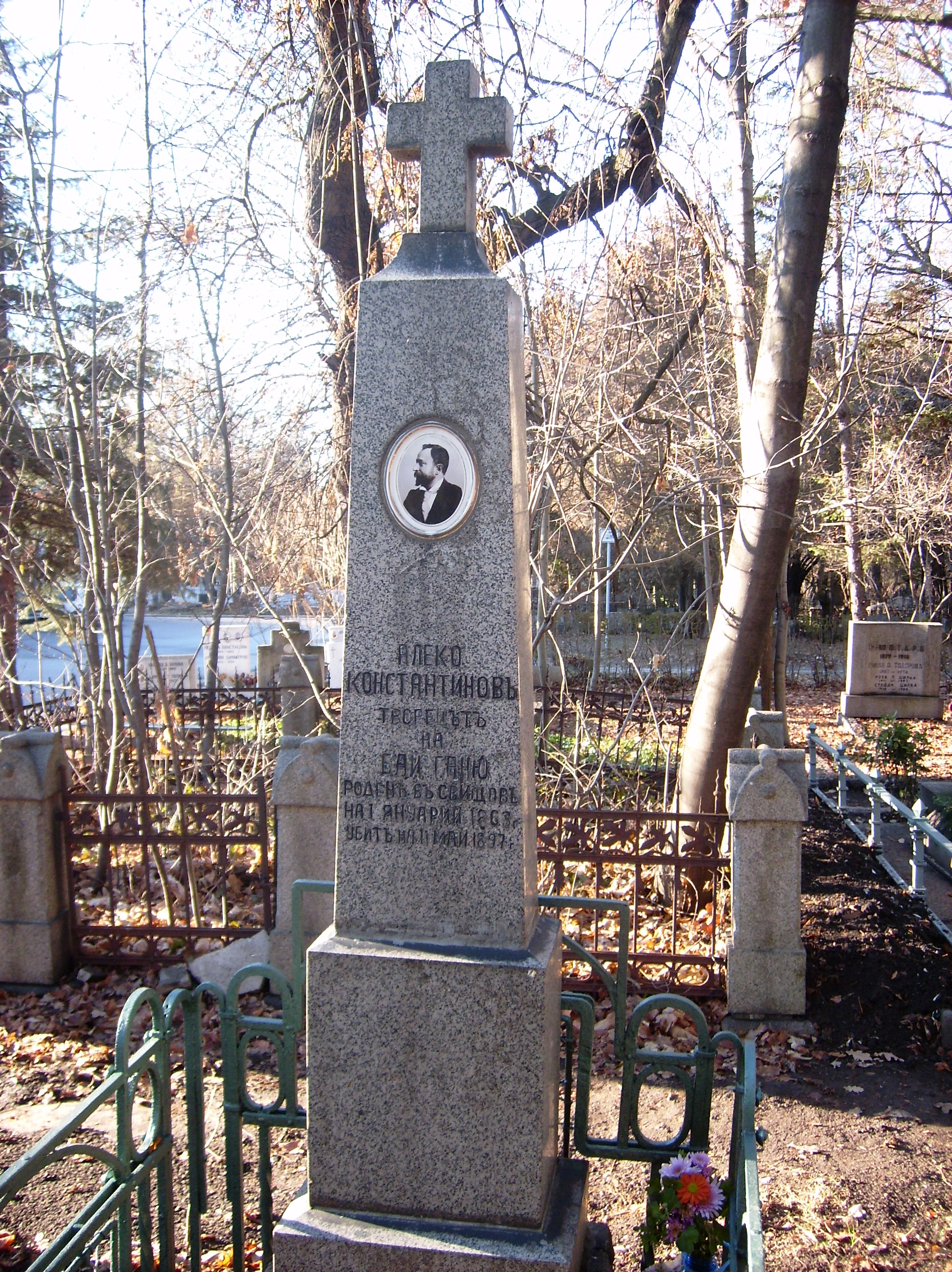
Aleko Konstantinov's Grave in Sofia Central Cemetery (42°42′47.3″N 023°20′02.5″E)

== See also ==
- Aleko Point
