= Bulgarian Sign Language =

Deaf sign language of Bulgaria

- Български жестомимичен език
- Native to: Bulgaria
- Native speakers: 21,000 (2021 DBS/DOOR/SIL) (2014)
- Language family: French Sign: Austro-Hungarian Sign?; Russian Sign Language creole?; Bulgarian Sign Language

Language codes
- ISO 639-3: bqn
- Glottolog: bulg1240

Bulgarian Sign Language (Bulgarian: Български жестомимичен език, romanized: Balgarski zhestomimichen ezik, BZhE) is the language, or perhaps languages, of the deaf community in Bulgaria.

Primary schools were established for the deaf. Russian Sign Language was introduced in 1910, and allowed in the classroom in 1945, and Wittmann (1991) classifies it as a descendant of Russian Sign. Bickford (2005) found that Bulgarian Sign is also a marginal part of a cluster with Slovak, Czech, Hungarian, Romanian, and Polish sign languages. The language of the classroom is different from that used by adults outside, and it is not clear if Wittmann and Bickford looked at the same language; nor, if one is derived from Russian Sign, if it is a dialect or if it creolized to form a new language.
