= Romanian Sign Language =

Deaf sign language of Romania

- Limba semnelor române
- Native to: Romania
- Native speakers: 25,000 (2019)
- Language family: French Sign: Romanian Sign Language

Language codes
- ISO 639-3: rms
- Glottolog: roma1324

The Romanian Sign Language (Romanian: Limba semnelor române, LSR) is the sign language used by deaf people in Romania. In Romania, the first organization dedicated to people with hearing impairments was the Romanian Society of the Deaf-Mute, established on 9 November 1919. It was continued by the Romanian Association of the Deaf-Mute (1952), and the National Association of the Deaf from Romania (Asociația Națională a Surzilor din România, ANSR, 1995).

Romanian Sign Language is also used in Moldova.
