= Hungarian Sign Language =

Deaf sign language of Hungary

- Magyar jelnyelv
- Native to: Hungary
- Region: Throughout Hungary, with possibly a few signers in western Romania
- Native speakers: 10,000 (2021)
- Language family: French Sign: Austro-Hungarian Sign; Hungarian Sign Language

Language codes
- ISO 639-3: hsh
- Glottolog: hung1263

- Person: Magyar
- People: Magyarok
- Language: Magyar nyelv, Magyar jelnyelv
- Country: Magyarország

Hungarian Sign Language (Hungarian: magyar jelnyelv, pronounced [ˈmɒɟɒr ˈjɛlɲɛlv]) is the sign language of deaf people in Hungary. There is historical evidence that Hungarian and Austrian Sign Language are related, but Bickford (2005) found that Hungarian, Slovak, and Czech Sign formed a cluster with Romanian, Bulgarian, and Polish Sign rather than with Austrian. Bickford also noted that there are about seven dialects of Hungarian Sign Language, with the variation connected to the residential deaf school where it is taught.

In November 2009, the Hungarian Parliament unanimously passed Act CXXV of 2009 on Hungarian Sign Language and the use of Hungarian Sign Language. In 2020, the act was amended to place HSL on equal footing with spoken Hungarian when it comes to state-recognized exams, recognized the right to emphasize the use of HSL instead of mainstreaming deaf children, and advancing the use of accessibility technologies.

The National Association of the Hungarian Deaf is called Siketek és Nagyothallók Országos Szövetsége (SINOSZ).
