= Languages of Kazakhstan =

- Official: Kazakh (state language), Russian
- National: Kazakh language
- Minority: Kazakh; German; Uzbek; Ukrainian; Uyghur; Tatar; Kyrgyz; Azerbaijani; Korean
- Foreign: English, German
- Signed: Kazakh Sign Language
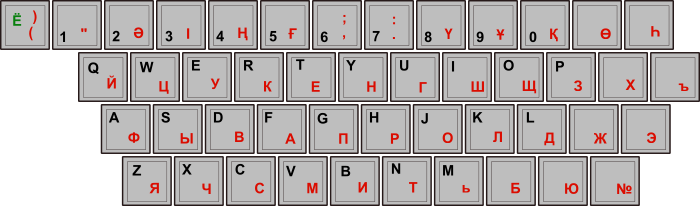
- Keyboard layout: ЙЦУКЕН The Kazakh keyboard.
- Source: Languages committee of the Ministry of culture and Sports
- Alphabet: Kazakh alphabets Kazakh Braille

Kazakhstan is officially a bilingual country. Kazakh, part of the Kipchak sub-branch of the Turkic languages, is proficiently spoken by 80.1% of the population according to the 2021 census, and has the status of "state language". Russian, on the other hand, is spoken by 83.7% as of 2021. The Constitution of Kazakhstan does not give it any special status, only allowing its use in government "on an equal footing" with Kazakh. Russian is also used routinely in business and inter-ethnic communication. However, only 63.45% of ethnic Kazakhs and 49.3% of the country's population are daily speakers of Kazakh language, according to the same census.

Other languages natively spoken in Kazakhstan are Dungan, Ili Turki, Ingush, Plautdietsch, and Sinte Romani. A number of more recent immigrant languages, such as Belarusian, Korean, Azerbaijani, and Greek are also spoken.

== Languages ==
The following table shows the share of the population that can speak the language according to the 2021 census:

| Language | % | Script |
|---|---|---|
| Russian | 83.7 | Cyrillic |
| Kazakh | 80.1 | Cyrillic, Latin |
| English | 35.1 | Latin |
| Uzbek | 2.5 | Latin, Cyrillic |
| Uyghur | 0.9 | Perso-Arabic, Latin |
| Turkish | 0.6 | Latin |
| German | 0.6 | Latin |
| Tatar | 0.5 | Cyrillic |
| Azerbaijani | 0.5 | Cyrillic, Latin, Perso-Arabic |
| Korean | 0.3 | Hangul |
| Kyrgyz | 0.2 | Cyrillic, Perso-Arabic |
| Belarusian | 0.1 | Cyrillic |
| Ukrainian | 0.1 | Cyrillic |
| Chinese | 0.1 | Chinese characters |
| Chechen | 0.1 | Cyrillic |
| French | 0.1 | Latin |
| Arabic | 0.1 | Arabic alphabet |
| Other | 2.7 | — |

== Gallery ==
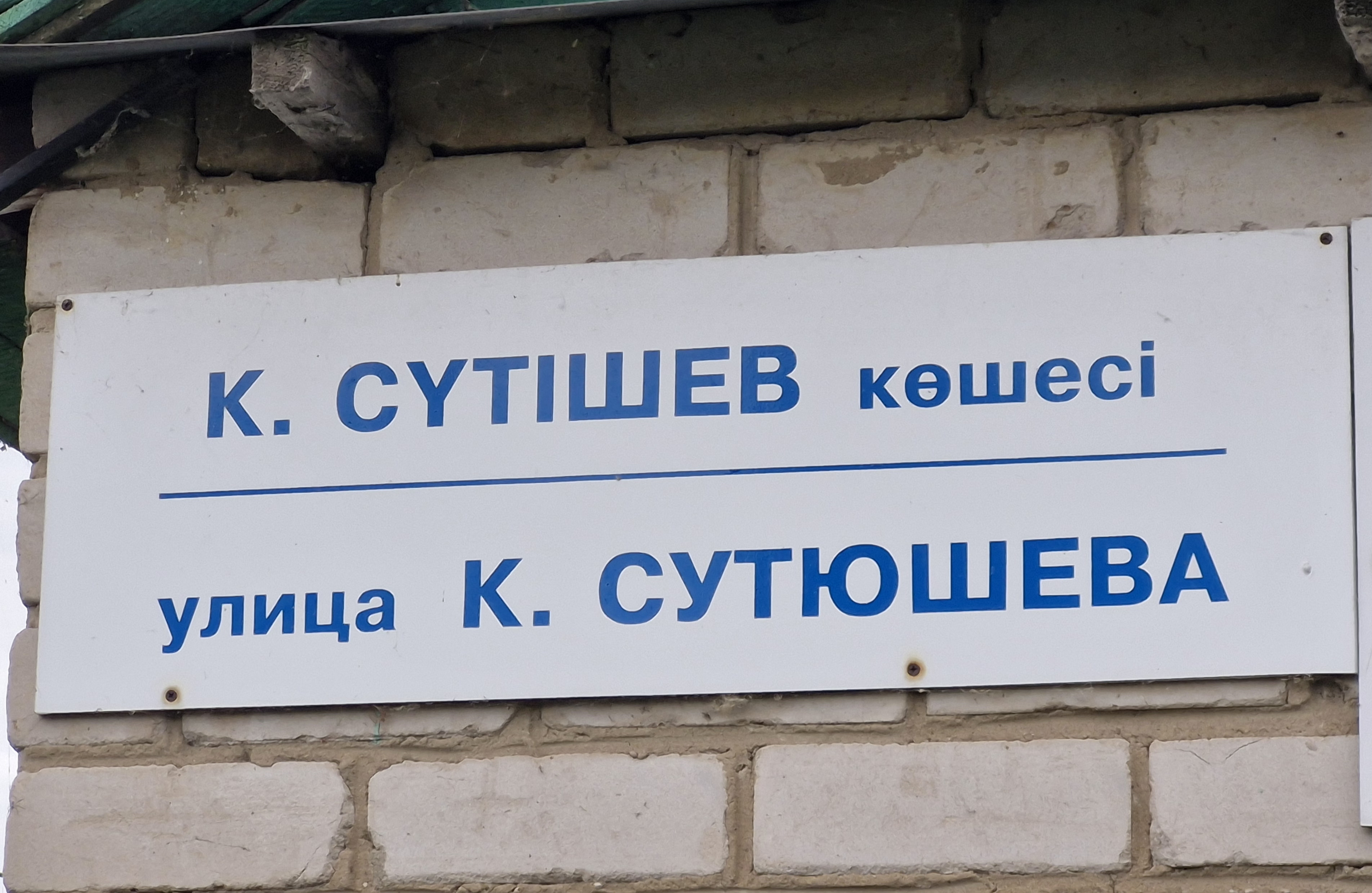
Many street signs in Kazakhstan are written in both Kazakh and Russian

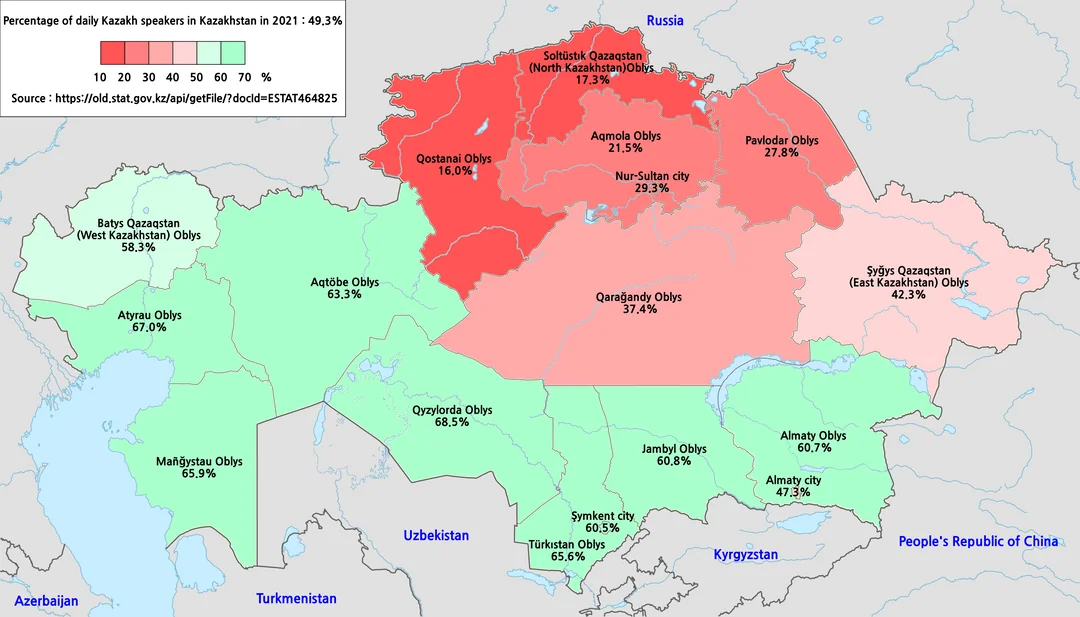
Percentage of daily Kazakh speakers in Kazakhstan according to the 2021 Census

Language proficiency by age group

== See also ==
- Demographics of Kazakhstan
