= Languages of Estonia =

- Official: Estonian (82%)
- Minority: Võro, Seto, Russian, Swedish, German, Ukrainian, Polish
- Foreign: Russian (66%); English (47%); Finnish (10%); German (7%)
- Signed: Estonian Sign Language, Russian Sign Language
- Keyboard layout: Estonian QWERTY

The official language of Estonia is Estonian, a Uralic language of the Finnic branch, which is related to Finnish. It is unrelated to the bordering Russian and Latvian languages, both of which are Indo-European (more specifically East Slavic and Baltic, respectively).

== Minority languages ==
=== Võro ===
Võro is a language from the Finnic branch of the Uralic languages. It used to be considered a dialect of the South Estonian dialect group of the Estonian language, but nowadays it has its own literary standard and is in search of official recognition as an indigenous regional language of Estonia.

=== Seto dialect ===
Seto is a language from the Finnic branch of the Uralic languages. It is sometimes identified as a dialect of either South Estonian (along with Võro, Tartu and Mulgi) or Võro, some linguists also consider Seto and Võro to be dialects from a common language, Võro-Seto, or Seto to be a language on its own, more similar to Medieval Estonian than the current standardized Estonian, having strong historical traditions, such as the Leelo folk songs. Setos (setokõsõq) mostly inhabit the area near Estonia's southeastern border with Russia in Setomaa, and are primarily Eastern Orthodox, while Võros (võrokõsõq) are traditionally Lutherans and live in historical Võru County.

=== Russian ===
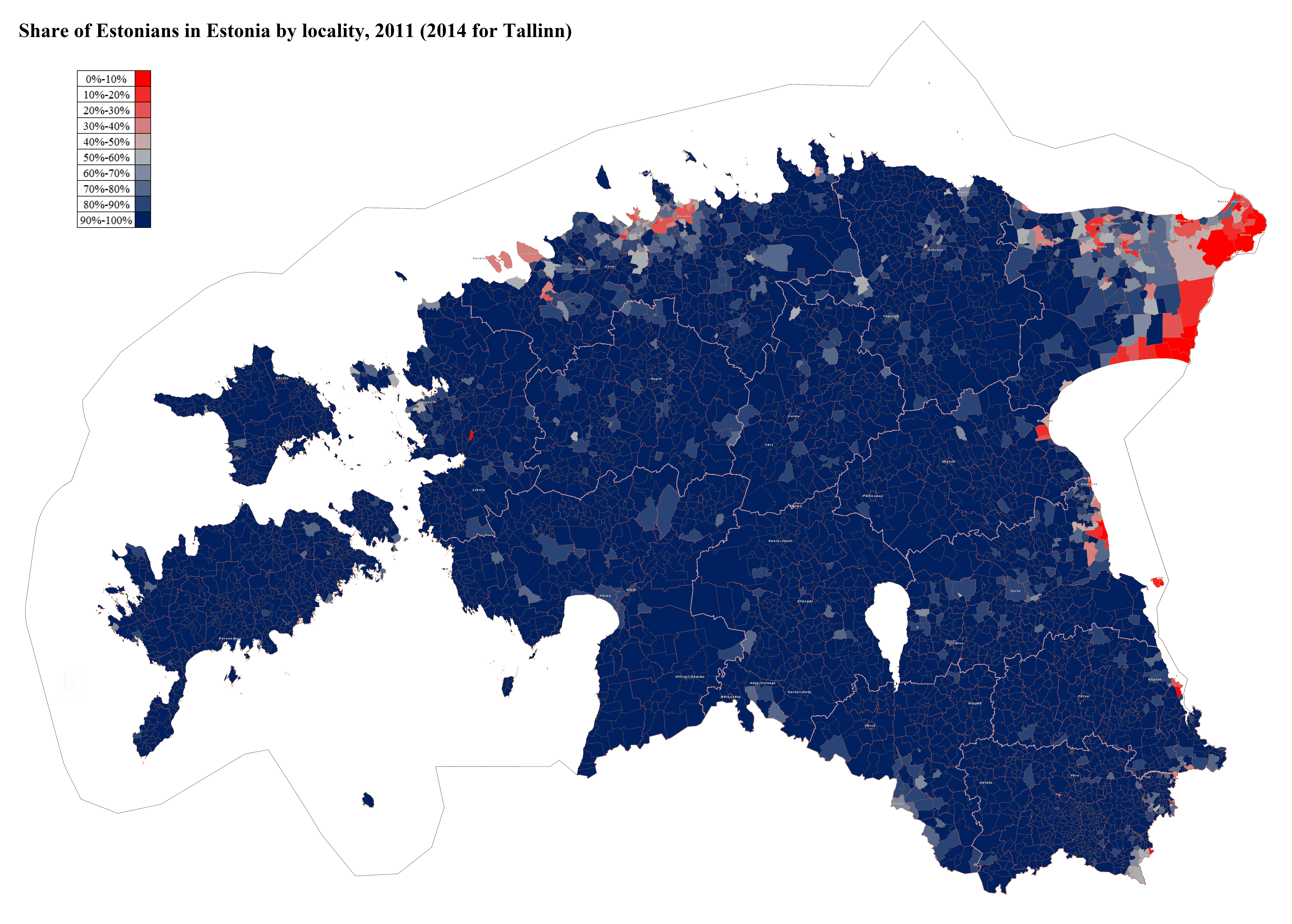
Share of ethnic Estonians by Estonian locality based on the 2011 census

Russian is by far the most spoken minority language in the country. There are towns in Estonia with large concentrations of Russian speakers and there are towns where Estonian speakers are in the minority (especially in the northeast, e.g. Narva).

=== Ukrainian ===
Historically, there have been Ukrainians in Estonia at least since the Livonian War, but their traces have been little documented. However, the University of Tartu has had an important place in the cultural history of Ukraine, where many Ukrainian students came to study in the 19th century, and even the Ukrainian student society Gromada was active in Tartu. More Ukrainians arrived in Estonia again with Soviet-era industrial immigration, but many of them speak Russian. Most of the Ukrainian speakers in Estonia today are Ukrainians who arrived in the country after the 2014 Russian aggression against Ukraine. There have been short-term attempts to teach the Ukrainian language in Estonian schools, and Ukrainian Sunday schools have also operated for a shorter period of time. There is no Ukrainian-language press in Estonia, nor have Ukrainian-language dictionaries and educational literature been published, though Ukrainian language station Radio Druzi operates.

=== Polish ===
The Polish language has been widely used in Estonia only during the relatively short period of Polish-Lithuanian Commonwealth rule in Southern Estonia, when it was also used as an administrative language. Until now, there have always been a small number of Poles in Estonia. A slightly larger number of Polish speakers immigrated to Estonia in the 19th century, when Polish scholars had freer conditions at the University of Tartu than in Poland under Russian rule, which is why several prominent Polish cultural figures studied in Tartu. Agricultural workers and miners also migrated to Estonia in the interwar period, when Polish congregations were also formed in the Catholic Church in Estonia, and even the local branch of the Polish scout movement (the Hartsers) started operating in North-East Estonia. Nowadays, the Polish language is little known in Estonia, it is only taught to a small extent at the University of Tartu, and a few phrasebooks have been published. However, services in Polish are still held occasionally in Estonian Catholic churches, and individual websites operate as media channels in Polish.

=== German ===
The Baltic Germans (German: Deutsch-Balten, or Baltendeutsche) were mostly ethnically German inhabitants of the eastern shore of the Baltic Sea, which today form the countries of Estonia and Latvia. The Baltic German population never made up more than 10% of the total. They formed the social, commercial, political and cultural élite in that region for several centuries. Some of them also took high positions in the military and civilian life of the Russian Empire, particularly in Saint Petersburg.

Their history and presence in the Baltics came to an abrupt end in late 1939 following the signing of the Molotov–Ribbentrop Pact and the subsequent Nazi-Soviet population transfers when almost all the Baltic Germans were resettled by the German Government into the Wartheland and Danzig-West Prussia. Today there are very few Germans living in Estonia aside from some temporary residents from Germany. The German language is the third most popular foreign language among Estonians.

=== Swedish ===
The Estonian Swedes, are a Swedish-speaking linguistic minority traditionally residing in the coastal areas and islands of what is now western and northern Estonia. The beginning of the continuous settlement of Estonian Swedes in these areas (known as Aiboland) dates back to the 13th and 14th centuries, when their Swedish-speaking ancestors arrived in Estonia from what is now Sweden and Finland. Almost all of Estonia's Swedish-speaking minority fled to Sweden during World War II, and only the descendants of a few individuals who opted to stay are permanently resident in Estonia today.

=== Sign languages ===
The Estonian Sign Language (ESL, Estonian: Eesti viipekeel) is the national sign language of Estonia. In 1998 there were about 4,500 signers out a population of 1,600 deaf and 20,000 hearing impaired. It is widespread in the cities of Tallinn and Pärnu among deaf ethnic Estonians; deaf Russian Estonians in Tallinn use Russian Sign Language, Russians outside Tallinn tend to use a Russian–Estonian Sign Language pidgin, or may be bilingual. In its formative stages, Estonian Sign Language was influenced by Russian and Finnish Sign Language; for example, the ESL sign for 'butterfly' developed from the Finnish sign for 'bird'. There are several dialects, the most archaic of which is the Pärnu variety.

=== Romani ===
Romani is spoken by the Roma minority in Estonia.
