= Vachagan Khalatyan =

- Վաչագան Խալաթյան
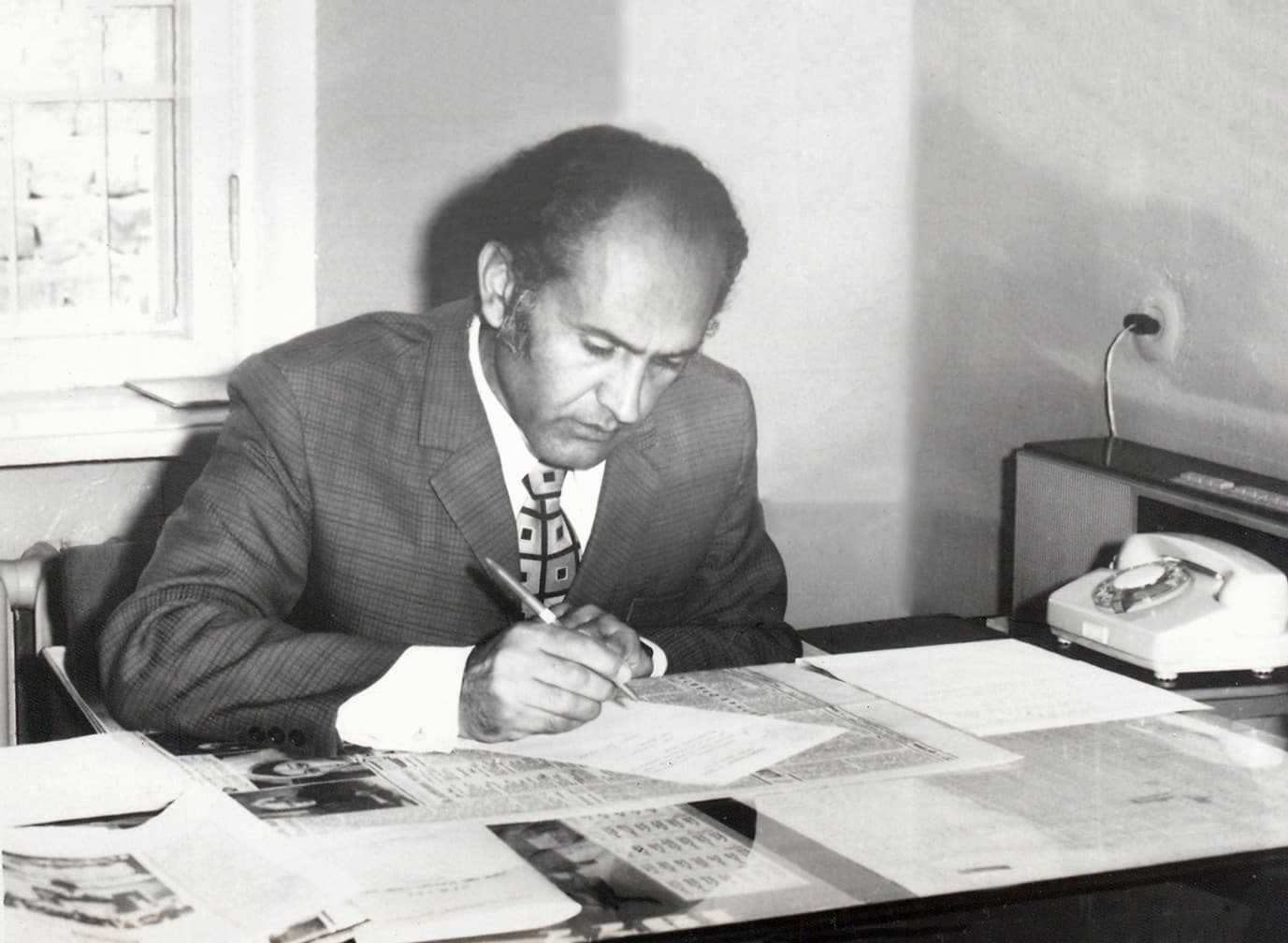
- Born: May 11, 1932; Urut, Armenian SSR
- Died: July 22, 2004 (aged 72); Yerevan, Armenia
- Education: Yerevan State Linguistic University after V. Bryusov; Moscow State Pedagogical University
- Known for: Originator of the Armenian manual alphabet; Armenian Sign Language, dictionaries
- Scientific career
- Fields: Deaf education
- Workplaces: Boarding school for Hearing- Impaired children in Yerevan; Armenian State Pedagogical University after K. Abovyan

Vachagan Khalatyan ( Armenian: Վաչագան Խալաթյան, Armenian pronunciation: [vɑtʃɑˈɡɑn χɑlɑtʰˈjɑn], 11 May 1932 — 22 July 2004) was a Deaf educator, PhD, and originator of the Armenian manual alphabet. He is recognized as the first deaf educator in Armenia.

== Early life and career ==
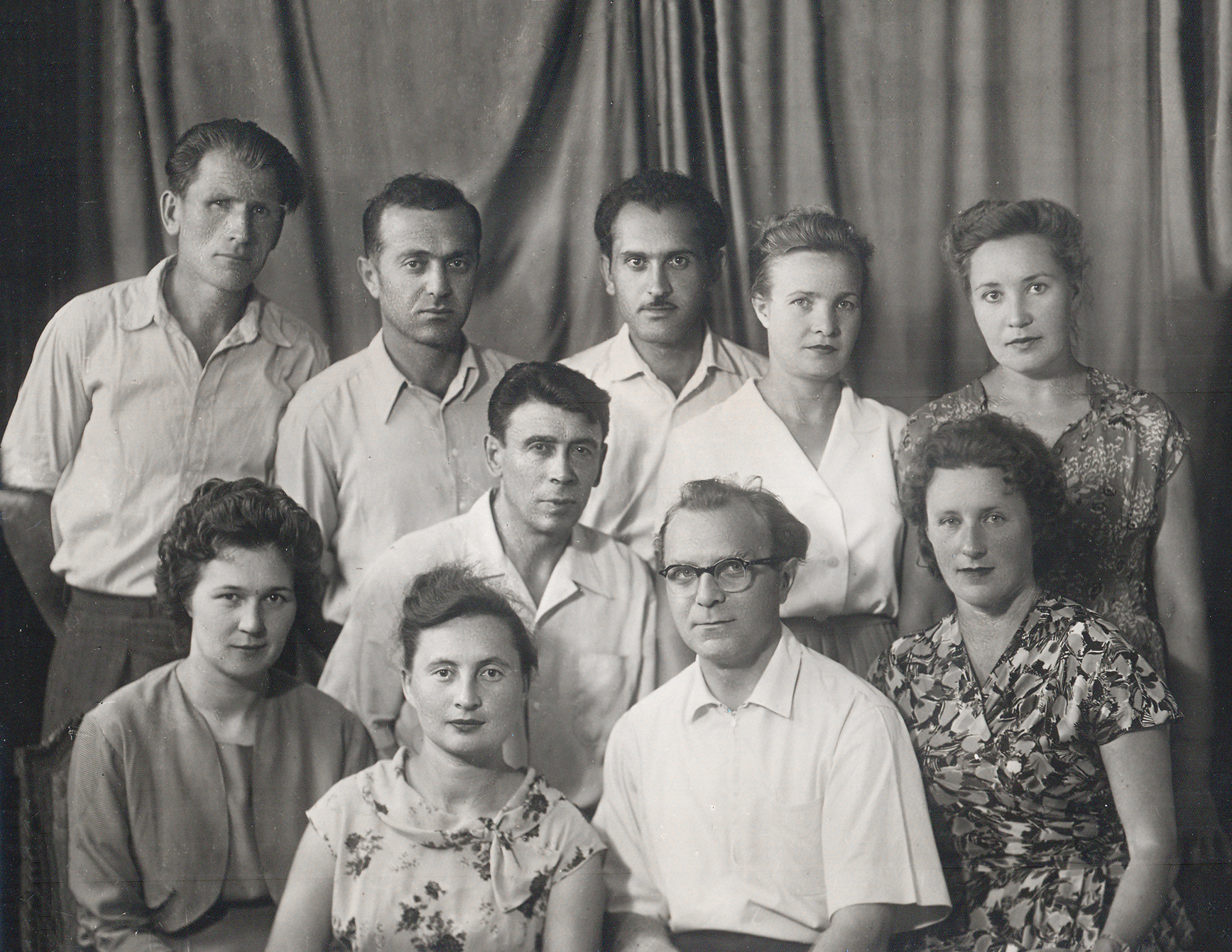
Moscow State Pedagogical University graduates, Department of Special Education (1959–1961). Khalatyan (top row, center).

Vachagan Khalatyan was born in Urut. After receiving a village school education and later a high school education in Stepanavan, he moved to Yerevan. Khalatyan graduated from the Department of French Language and Literature at Yerevan State Linguistic University named after Valery Brusov (YSLU) in 1954, having attended from 1949.

In 1954, Khalatyan was drafted into the Soviet Army. In 1958, he began working at a boarding school in Yerevan for Deaf children as an Armenian language teacher and a paraprofessional educator, providing more intensive instructional sessions in a resource room.

Khalatyan completed a distance learning program and graduated from the Faculty of Deaf Education at Moscow State Pedagogical University (1959–1961). He earned his PhD in Education from Moscow State Pedagogical University in 1983.

During his student years, meeting with Galina Zaitseva, known for her research on sign language and Deaf history and culture, and K. A. Mikaelyan, who had been one of the leading organizers of the system of education and upbringing for children with hearing problems in Moscow since the 1930s, was inspiring and marked the beginning of a long-term professional collaboration.

== Career ==
=== Armenian Manual Alphabet ===
In 1961, Khalatyan created the Armenian Manual Alphabet, a significant development for the Armenian Deaf community.

The unique aspect of Khalatyan's Armenian Manual Alphabet, compared to manual alphabets in languages like ASL or BSL, is its direct correspondence to the distinctive, highly phonetic nature of the original Armenian script.

The original Armenian alphabet, created by Mesrop Mashtots around 405AD, was designed to be highly phonetic, with each of its 39 letters generally corresponding to a single, specific sound or phoneme. Khalatyan's manual alphabet replicates this precision in hand signs. In contrast, manual alphabets for languages like English (ASL) must account for a writing system in which single letters or letter combinations can produce multiple distinct sounds (e.g., 'c' in 'cat' vs. 'chair'), making the direct sound-to-sign mapping of the Armenian system a notable feature.

In developing the dactylic alphabet of the Armenian language, initially, Khalatyan followed a traditional approach, striving to design dactylemes that closely mirrored the visual structure of Armenian letters. In the resulting alphabet, 56% of the dactylemes were fully identical to their corresponding letters, while 31% were partially similar.

However, experimental testing revealed that this "visual-first" approach was impractical. The Armenian alphabet's composition and graphic structure are highly distinct. The Armenian alphabet has 39 letters—more than in other languages (French and English have 26; Russian has 33).

The graphic appearance of Armenian letters is very complex; at the same time, they are less contrasting than the letters of other alphabets, such as Russian or English. The basis for writing Armenian letters is a square (rather than round, as in most alphabets of other languages) form. Designing dactylemes based on "maximal similarity" to written letters inevitably resulted in visual ambiguity, as many signs became difficult to distinguish from one another. Distinguishing them, as the experiment showed, proved very difficult, and execution required significant muscle tension, which negatively affected the technique of dactylization.

Khalatyan made a bold decision: he created a new version of the dactylic alphabet based on the phonetic system of the Armenian language (and not on the specifics of the graphic representation of the letters!). The signs in Khalatyan's system are based on the visually unique and "artistically calligraphic" shapes of the Armenian script, which do not resemble Latin or Cyrillic characters. This means the handshapes themselves are distinct and not easily transferable to manual alphabets of other languages, which are typically based on the local script (e.g., the one-handed alphabet for ASL's Latin script, or the two-handed alphabet for BSL's Latin script).

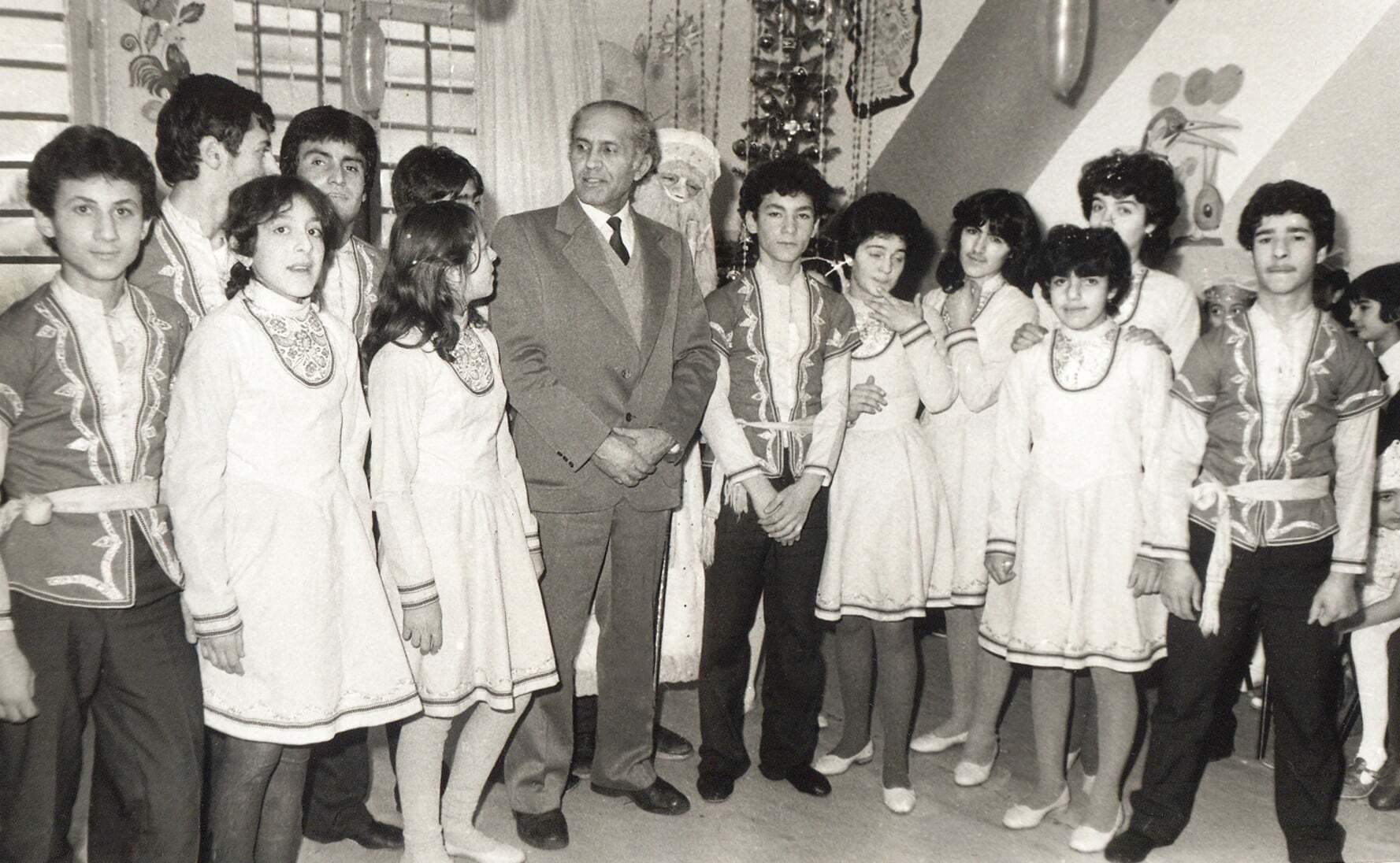
Khalatyan at the New Year's Eve party with the students of the school dance group

=== School ===
In 1967, Khalatyan founded the first boarding school and kindergarten for children with hearing impairments, implementing specialized auditory-oral methods and immersive language development. Under his leadership for over two decades, the institution also offered vocational training in woodworking, shoe repair, and sewing, ensuring a rich environment for hearing-impaired students to thrive academically, socially, and emotionally.

=== Educator and researcher ===
Khalatyan has focused on issues related to deaf education and the training of scholarly, scientific, and pedagogical staff at the Armenian State Pedagogical University after Khachatur Abovyan (ASPU), where he delivered lectures on special education. He also organized teacher training programs. Khalatyan was invited to establish the Department of Speech and Hearing Sciences at the Armenian State Pedagogical University (ASPU), where he spearheaded the training of pedagogical staff.

An active member of the global academic community, he frequently presented at international conferences on advancements in deaf education. He participated in international conferences as a speaker, contributing to issues related to deaf education.

Khalatyan's legacy is defined by his authorship of foundational dictionaries and resources that standardized special pedagogy and sign language studies in Armenia. These works cemented his reputation not only as an innovative pedagogue but also as a vital lexicographer and author in Armenian deaf education.

- Dictionary of Special Pedagogy: A foundational reference work for professionals in the field
- Concise Dictionary of Sign Language (2001): An early, accessible guide to common signs
- Hands Speak (2004): A more comprehensive Armenian sign language dictionary, crucial for preserving and teaching local sign language to a wider audience

== Monographs ==
=== Overview of publications ===
- "Features of the development of attention of the deaf children" - "Sovetakan Mankavarjh" / "Soviet educator" /, journal No. .9, p. 28-31, 1971.
- "Let us be attentive to them" - "Sovetakan dprots" / "Soviet school" /, newspaper, 28/04/ 1971.
- "How to check your child's hearing" - "Sovetakan dprots" / "Soviet school" /, newspaper, 9/02/1972.
- "A few words about the education of hearing impaired children" - "Sovetakan Mankavarjh" / "Soviet educator" /, journal No. 7, p. 17-19, 1973.
- Armenian manual alphabet - miscellany "Deaf education", No. .4, p. 56-58, 1973.
- "Literacy and learning items in Armenian school for hearing- impaired" – 7th Scientific Session on deaf education, p. 162,1975.
- " Opinions, causes and consequences" - "Sovetakan dprots" / "Soviet school" /, newspaper, 29/05/1975.
- "Manual alphabet and sign language" - "Gitutyun ev technika" / "Science and Technology" /, journal No. .12, p. 38-45, 1976.
- "Where to start the education for the deaf" - "Sovetakan Mankavarjh" / "Soviet educator" /, journal No. 2, p. 21-24, 979.
- "Special attitude to the special schools" - "Sovetakan dprots" / "Soviet school" /, newspaper, 15/05/1979.
- "Lip reading" - "Sovetakan Mankavarjh", / "Soviet educator" /, journal No. 11, p. 71-72, 1980.
- "Homework assignments in special boarding schools" - "Sovetakan dprots" / "Soviet school" /, newspaper, 7/01/1980.
- "Peculiarities of the speech development of the deaf children" - "Sovetakan Mankavarjh" / "Soviet educator" /, journal No. 4, p. 54-57, 1984.
- "Special schools a way out from the impasse" - "Dprutyun" /ex. "Sovetakan dprots"/, / "Soviet school" /newspaper, 06/03/1990.
- "Talking Hands" - - "Yerevan", journal, 11/03/1991.
- "Educational or charity institution" - "Dprutyun" / ex. "Sovetakan dprots" / "Soviet school"/, newspaper, 04/06/1991.
- "Is Deaf education a science or not?" – "Hayastany Hanrapetutyun", /"Republic of Armenia"/, newspaper, 27/12/1992.
- "Special education or inclusion?" - "Dprutyun" / ex. "Sovetakan dprots" /, "Soviet school", newspaper, 01-08/02/1996.
- "The system of special education and its problems" - "Dprutyun" / ex. "Sovetakan dprots" / "Soviet school" /, newspaper, 1996.
- "Issues for open discussion" - "Dprutyun" / ex. "Sovetakan dprots" / "Soviet school" /newspaper, 17/07/1996.
- "Training and education for the deaf in the United States" - "Dprutyun" / ex. "Sovetakan dprots" / "Soviet school" /, newspaper, 1-17/09/1996.
- "A retrospective view" - "Khaghagh Ashkharh" / "Peaceful World" /, 12/03/1991.
- "SES (special education specialists) for special schools" - "Dprutyun" / ex. "Sovetakan dprots" / "Soviet school"/, newspaper, 26/12/1991.
- "The problems of inclusion for deaf - 3rd International Scientific Conference on the item of "Supporting physical and mental development of children with disabilities in education, training and rehabilitation programs", Yerevan, 22-23/12/ 1995.
- "The issues of education for children with hearing impairment" – a thesis, 48th scientific conference in Yerevan, 1998.

=== Authored books ===
- Armenian Sign Language - Dictionary (study guide), 2001.
- Dictionary of Special Education (manual), 2001.
- Talking Hands –Armenian Sign Language, Dictionary (study guide), 2004

== See also ==
- Fingerspelling
- Sign language
- Armenian Sign Language
