= Latvian Sign Language =

Sign language used in Latvia

- Latviešu zīmju valoda
- Native to: Latvia
- Native speakers: 2,000 (2014)
- Language family: French Sign?: Austro-Hungarian Sign?; Russian Sign Language?; Latvian Sign Language

Language codes
- ISO 639-3: lsl
- Glottolog: latv1245

Latvian Sign Language (Latvian: latviešu zīmju valoda) is a sign language commonly used by deaf people in Latvia. Linguists use LSL as an acronym for Latvian Sign Language.

== Policy and education ==
The Official Language Law of 9 December 1999, which came into force on 1 September 2000, gave Latvian Sign Language a legal status in Section 3.3, which stipulates: 'The State shall ensure the development and use of the Latvian sign language for communication with people with impaired hearing.' Since 2008, Latvia has been screening newborns for hearing impairment.

The majority of Latvian DHI (deaf and hearing impaired) children live in boarding schools instead of with their families. The country has two specialist schools for DHI children that offer elementary education over a period of 10 or 12 years, one of which uses LSL and signed Latvian in instruction, while the other uses spoken language. In both schools, children primarily communicate amongst themselves in sign language. Aside from the two specialist schools, some schools exist which provide separate classes for DHI children, while in the remaining schools DHI children learn alongside their peers with normal hearing.

== Research ==
Latvian Sign Language is claimed to have separated from French Sign Language some time around 1806.

Mahoney (2017) conducted the first-known 100-word Swadesh–Woodward list comparison of Latvian Sign Language and Estonian Sign Language (EVK), concluding that a possible relationship between them – as descending from VLFS, perhaps via ÖGS and/or RSL, as Wittmann (1991) and Bickford (2005) proposed – was 'still uncertain as it is unclear how sign languages disseminated in Eastern European countries during the Soviet Union, but aside from superficial impressions that the core lexicons are similar, signs with shared parameters displaying small variation in handshape while retaining 4 selected fingers suggests that these languages share a parent'. She added that '[a]t present there is no reason to assume that Estonian and Latvian sign language have a mother-daughter relationship'.

Power et al. (2020) conducted a large-scale data study into the evolution and contemporary character of 76 of manual alphabets (MAs) of sign languages, concluding that Latvian Sign Language's manual alphabet showed characteristics that were both typical of a postulated 'Russian Group' (including Russian, Ukrainian, Bulgarian and Estonian Sign Language) as well as a postulated 'Polish Group' (including Polish and Lithuanian Sign Language), and was therefore placed in between.
