= Georgian Sign Language =

Deaf sign language of Georgia

- ქართული ჟესტური ენა
- Native to: Georgia
- Language family: Russian Sign Language: Georgian Sign Language

Language codes
- ISO 639-3: None (mis)
- Glottolog: geor1254
- IETF: rsl-GE

Georgian Sign Language (Georgian: ქართული ჟესტური ენა, romanized: kartuli zhest'uri ena) is the national sign language of the deaf in the country of Georgia.

Fingerspelling originally used an alphabet based on the Russian manual alphabet.
