= Deafness in Austria =

Austrian Sign Language (ÖGS) is an independent language of Austria used by about 8,000 to 10,000 Austrians across the country. Like any sign language, ÖGS is predominantly used by deaf and hard-of-hearing people. In Austria, these people are typically identified as deaf during the newborn health screening, through which 90% of all infants in the country receive a hearing test. The availability of this test allows 35% of possibly deaf newborns to receive a diagnosis before 3 months, and 69% of them to receive intervention before 6 months. It also provides insight on the rate of congenital hearing impairment; in Austria, this rate is 1.11 to every 1,000 newborns.

A common intervention practice for these children is Family Centred Early Intervention, or FCEI. This practice was officially started in Austria in 2012, and has since expanded globally while remaining a popular practice within the country. Additionally, Austria has been a part of the UN CRPD since 2008 and participates in the optional protocol, giving applicable individuals the ability to directly communicate with the UN Disability Rights Committee in Geneva. The Ombudsman's Office is the assigned advisory party of institutions and programs for disabled peoples of Austria.

== Human and civil rights ==
The UN CRPD has been applicable in Austria through legislation and enforcement since October 26 of 2008. Additionally, Austria has also signed the optional protocol, which allows individuals and groups the ability to send complaints directly to the UN Disability Rights Committee in Geneva. In response to this addition, the Ombudsman's Office has acted as an advisory body by surveilling the available institutions and programs within Austria for disabled peoples.

== Sign languages ==
Article 8 of the official Austrian Constitution of 1920 states that "German is the official language of the Republic without prejudice to the rights provided by Federal law for linguistic minorities." The constitution also classifies Austrian Sign Language (ÖGS) as an independent language, which contains details regulated by individual laws. Austrian Sign Language is also known by the name "Carinthian Sign Language", and is estimated to have originated in the year 1870. As of 2014, the EUD estimated that the language has between 8,000 and 10,000 users across the country and carries substantial variation or dialect across different regions, including Vienna, Carinthia, and Styria. While the language is historically related to Russian Sign Language, it shares the most similarities with French Sign Language through its highly similar fingerspelling system.

== Newborn hearing screening ==
Newborn hearing screenings began in Austria in the early nineties. Nationwide implementation of these screenings was put in place in 1995 after the Austrian ENT Society endorsed them and created guidelines for their practices. According to the guidelines in place, newborns are tested a few days after birth and will go through a second screening prior to being discharged if they do not have a passing result in their first test. Currently, about 90% of Austrian newborns receive the screening. This number has been rising since the implementation of the screening by the Austrian ENT Society because despite the test never being required by law or legislation, the current healthcare standards recommend hearing loss detection to be found between the age of 3 months and for intervention to be allowed before 6 months. In 2003, the national child health care program made infant hearing checks a routine practice in order to qualify the UNHS a quasi-mandatory preventive measure. Because of this status, the Austrian government requires consistent evidence that the program and its efforts improve or, at minimum, preserve the state of healthcare in the country.

A study was performed 10 years after the official implementation of hearing tests in newborn health screenings, and it found that 35% of newborns who failed to pass the hearing test received a medical diagnosis of hearing loss before 3 months of age and 69% of those who failed were introduced to a method of early intervention in their first 6 months. Alternatively, of newborns who did not receive a hearing test, 4% received access to early intervention before the age of 6 months. Beyond this study throughout the country's entirety, the average rate of congenital hearing impairment is 1.11 newborns for every 1,000 babies born.

== Early intervention ==
The FCEI (Family Centred Early Intervention) is a method of early intervention that focuses the importance of family in the well-being of the child. The practices in FCEI are typically contrasted against other forms of intervention that revolve around the child themself, medical orientation, or clinical orientations. The FCEI was a practice started in Austria by doctors Daniel Holzinger and Johannes Fellinge, who aimed to bring together both hearing and deaf parents and professionals in an effort to develop family-centered practices and research.
