= Wedding of Silence =

- Directed by: Pavel Medvedev
- Release date: 2004
- Country: Russia
- Languages: Russian & Russian Sign Language

Wedding of Silence (Svaďba tišiny) is a 2004 Russian short documentary film directed by Pavel Medvedev. It won the Best Documentary Film award at the Karlovy Vary International Film Festival in 2003. It uses Russian Sign Language.

== See also ==
- List of films featuring the deaf and hard of hearing
