= Urut =

Urut Ուռուտ
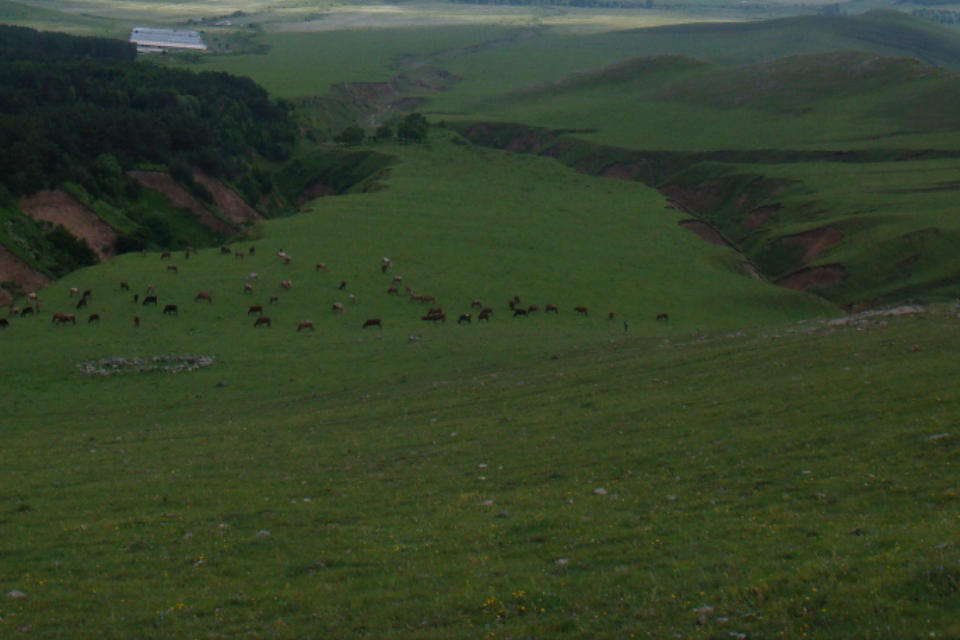

- Location within Armenia
- Coordinates: 41°04′16″N 44°23′49″E
- Country: Armenia
- Province: Lori
- Elevation: 1,450 m (4,760 ft)

Population (2011)
  - Total: 1,020
- Time zone: UTC+4 (AMT)

Urut (Armenian: Ուռուտ) is a village in the Lori Province of Armenia.

== Notable people ==
- Vachagan Khalatyan, Deaf educator, PhD, originator of the Armenian manual alphabet
