= Kazakh Braille =

Braille alphabet of the Kazakh language

- Script type: Alphabet
- Print basis: Kazakh alphabet
- Languages: Kazakh

Related scripts
- Parent systems: Braille: Russian Braille; Kazakh Braille

The braille alphabet used for the Kazakh language is based on Russian Braille, with several additional letters found in the print Kazakh alphabet.

== Alphabet ==
Kazakh uses all of the letters of the Russian alphabet, though some just in loans and has the additional letters ә, ғ, қ, ң, һ, ө, ұ, ү, і.

Print	а a	ә ä	б b	в v	г g	ғ ğ	д d	е e	ё yo	ж j	з z	и i	й y	к k
Braille	⠁ (braille pattern dots-1)	⠜ (braille pattern dots-345)	⠃ (braille pattern dots-12)	⠺ (braille pattern dots-2456)	⠛ (braille pattern dots-1245)	⠻ (braille pattern dots-12456)	⠙ (braille pattern dots-145)	⠑ (braille pattern dots-15)	⠡ (braille pattern dots-16)	⠚ (braille pattern dots-245)	⠵ (braille pattern dots-1356)	⠊ (braille pattern dots-24)	⠯ (braille pattern dots-12346)	⠅ (braille pattern dots-13)
Print	қ q	л l	м m	н n	ң ñ	о o	ө ö	п p	р r	с s	т t	у w	ұ u	ү ü
Braille	⠹ (braille pattern dots-1456)	⠇ (braille pattern dots-123)	⠍ (braille pattern dots-134)	⠝ (braille pattern dots-1345)	⠩ (braille pattern dots-146)	⠕ (braille pattern dots-135)	⠣ (braille pattern dots-126)	⠏ (braille pattern dots-1234)	⠗ (braille pattern dots-1235)	⠎ (braille pattern dots-234)	⠞ (braille pattern dots-2345)	⠥ (braille pattern dots-136)	⠬ (braille pattern dots-346)	⠌ (braille pattern dots-34)
Print	ф f	х x	һ h	ц c	ч ç	ш ş	щ şç	ъ ʕ	ы ɨ	і ı	ь ʔ	э ê	ю yu	я ya
Braille	⠋ (braille pattern dots-124)	⠓ (braille pattern dots-125)	⠧ (braille pattern dots-1236)	⠉ (braille pattern dots-14)	⠟ (braille pattern dots-12345)	⠱ (braille pattern dots-156)	⠭ (braille pattern dots-1346)	⠷ (braille pattern dots-12356)	⠮ (braille pattern dots-2346)	⠽ (braille pattern dots-13456)	⠾ (braille pattern dots-23456)	⠪ (braille pattern dots-246)	⠳ (braille pattern dots-1256)	⠫ (braille pattern dots-1246)

Apart from ⠽ і, which once existed in Russian Braille and ⠬ ұ, which is the same as the ў of Belarusian Braille (a letter which was used in earlier Kazakh alphabets with the same value), the braille values assigned to the extra Kazakh letters do not follow the assignments of other languages that use the Cyrillic script in print. They also do not follow international norms, apart from ⠜ ә (Latin ä).

== Punctuation ==
Single punctuation:

Print	,	.	?	!	;	:
Braille	⠂ (braille pattern dots-2)	⠲ (braille pattern dots-256)	⠢ (braille pattern dots-26)	⠖ (braille pattern dots-235)	⠆ (braille pattern dots-23)	⠒ (braille pattern dots-25)

Paired punctuation:

Kazakh Braille is reported to use the Russian arithmetical parentheses ⠣ ... ⠜.

Print	« ... »	( ... )
Braille	...	...

== Formatting ==
italics	capital	number
⠸ (braille pattern dots-456)	⠨ (braille pattern dots-46)	⠼ (braille pattern dots-3456)

== See also ==
- Languages of Kazakhstan
- Kazakh alphabets#Correspondence chart, for the braille alphabet aligned with the Cyrillic
