= Kazakh Sign Language =

Sign language used in Kazakhstan

- Native to: Kazakhstan
- Language family: French Sign: Austro-Hungarian Sign; Russian Sign Language; Kazakh Sign Language

Language codes
- ISO 639-3: –
- Glottolog: kaza1251 Kazakh–Russian Sign Language
- IETF: rsl-KZ

Kazakh Sign Language (KSL) or Kazakh–Russian Sign Language (KRSL) is a dialect of Russian Sign Language used in Kazakhstan.

== See also ==
- Kazakh language
- Russian Sign Language
