= Kazakh language =

Kipchak Turkic language

Kazakh
- қазақша, қазақ тілі qazaqşa, qazaq tılı قازاقشا, قازاق ٴتىلى قزاقچه, قزاق تلى
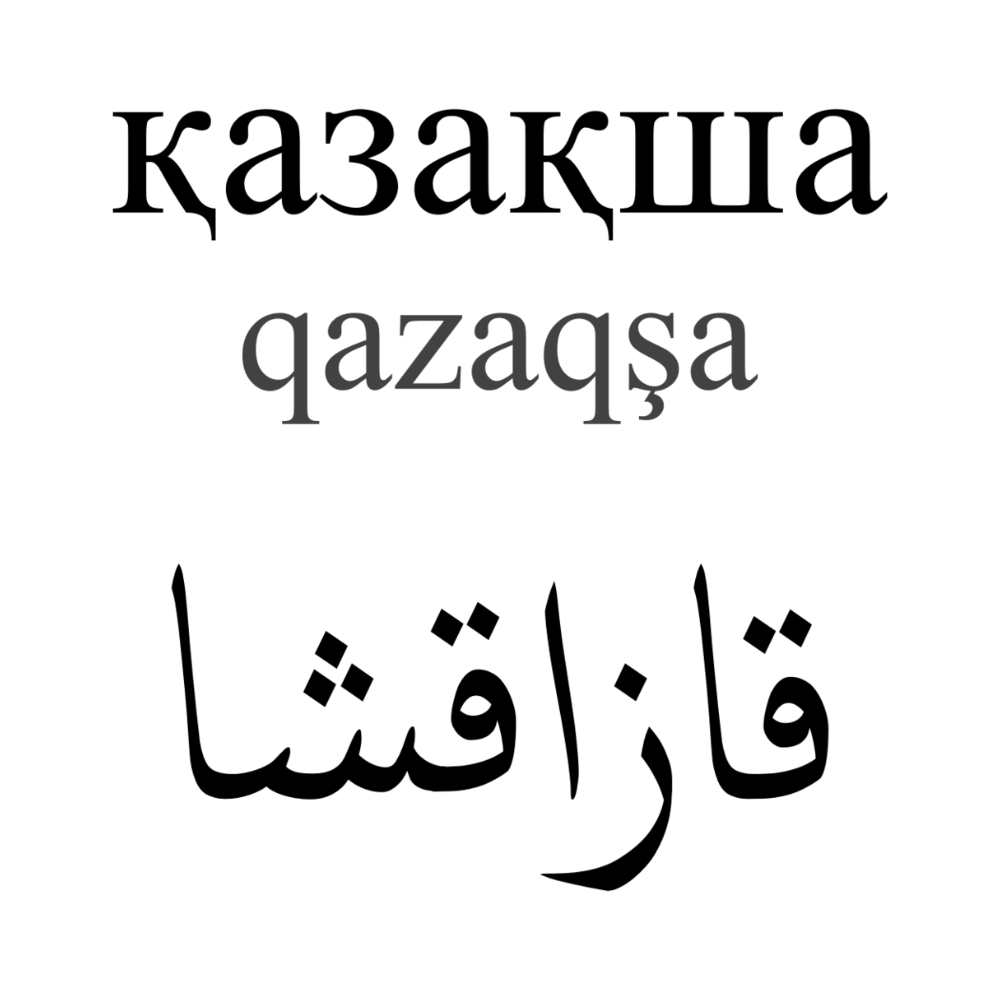
- Kazakh in Cyrillic, Latin, and Perso-Arabic scripts
- Pronunciation: [qʰɑzɑqˈʃɑ] [qʰɑˈzɑq tʰɘˈlɘ]
- Native to: Kazakhstan, China, Mongolia, Russia, Kyrgyzstan, Uzbekistan
- Region: Central Asia (Turkestan)
- Ethnicity: Kazakhs
- Native speakers: 16 million (2021 census)
- Language family: Turkic: Common Turkic; Kipchak; Kipchak–Nogai; Kazakh
- Writing system: Kazakh alphabets (Cyrillic script, Latin script, Perso-Arabic script, Kazakh Braille)

Official status
- Official language in: Kazakhstan; Russia: Altai Republic; China: Ili Kazakh Autonomous Prefecture; Barköl Kazakh Autonomous County; Mori Kazakh Autonomous County; Aksay Kazakh Autonomous County; Organisations: Organization of Turkic States Collective Security Treaty Organization
- Regulated by: Ministry of Culture and Sports; Ministry of Science and Higher Education of the Republic of Kazakhstan

Language codes
- ISO 639-1: kk
- ISO 639-2: kaz
- ISO 639-3: kaz
- Glottolog: kaza1248
- Linguasphere: 44-AAB-cc
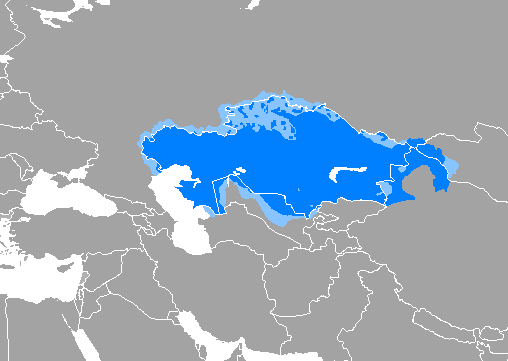
- The Kazakh-speaking world: regions where Kazakh is the language of the majority regions where Kazakh is the language of a significant minority

A Kazakh speaker, recorded in Taiwan

A Kazakh speaker, recorded in Kazakhstan

Kazakh (Note: Cyrillic script: қазақша or қазақ тілі; Latin script: qazaqşa or qazaq tılı; Arabic script: قازاقشا or قازاق ٴتىلى; [qʰɑzɑqʃɑ́] or [qʰɑzɑ́q tʰɘlɘ́]) is a Turkic language of the Kipchak branch, spoken in Central Asia by the Kazakhs. It is closely related to Nogai, Kyrgyz, and Karakalpak. It is the official language of Kazakhstan and has official status in the Altai Republic of Russia. It is also a minority language in the Ili Kazakh Autonomous Prefecture in Xinjiang, China, and in the Bayan-Ölgii Province of western Mongolia. The language is also spoken by many ethnic Kazakhs throughout the former Soviet Union (some 472,000 in Russia according to the 2010 Russian census), as well as in Germany and Turkey.

Like other Turkic languages, Kazakh is an agglutinative language and employs vowel harmony. Kazakh builds words by adding suffixes one after another to the word stem, with each suffix expressing only one unique meaning and following a fixed sequence. Ethnologue recognises three mutually intelligible dialect groups: North-Eastern Kazakh—the most widely spoken variety, which also serves as the basis for the official language—Southern Kazakh, and Western Kazakh. The language shares a degree of mutual intelligibility with the closely related Karakalpak language, while its Western dialects maintain limited mutual intelligibility with the Altai languages.

In October 2017, the then president, Nursultan Nazarbayev, decreed that the writing system would change from Cyrillic to Latin script by 2025. The proposed Latin alphabet has been revised several times and, as of January 2021, is close to the inventory of the Turkish alphabet, though it lacks the letters C and Ç and has four additional letters: Ä, Ñ, Q, and Ū (though other letters, such as Y, have different values in the two languages). It is scheduled to be phased in from 2023 to 2031. Over one million Kazakh speakers in Xinjiang use a modified version of the Perso-Arabic script for writing.

== Geographic distribution ==
Speakers of Kazakh are spread over a vast territory, from the Tian Shan to the western shore of the Caspian Sea. Kazakh is the official state language of Kazakhstan, with nearly 10 million speakers (based on information from the CIA World Factbook on population and proportion of Kazakh speakers).

In China, nearly two million ethnic Kazakhs and Kazakh speakers reside in the Ili Kazakh Autonomous Prefecture of Xinjiang.

== History ==
The Kipchak branch of Turkic languages, to which Kazakh belongs, was largely consolidated during the period of the Golden Horde. The modern Kazakh language is thought to have taken shape around 1465 AD, during the formation of the Kazakh Khanate. Modern Kazakh is likely a descendant of both Chagatay Turkic, as spoken by the Timurids, and Kipchak Turkic, as spoken in the Golden Horde.

Kazakh contains a substantial number of loanwords from Persian and Arabic, owing to frequent historical interactions between Kazakhs and Iranian ethnic groups to the south. Furthermore, Persian served as a lingua franca in the Kazakh Khanate, enabling Kazakhs to incorporate Persian words into their spoken and written vernacular. Meanwhile, Arabic was used by Kazakhs in mosques and mausoleums, functioning as a language reserved for religious contexts—much as Latin served as a liturgical language in the Western European cultural sphere.

The Kazakhs used the Arabic script to write their language until approximately 1929. In the early 1900s, the Kazakh activist Akhmet Baitursynuly reformed the Kazakh–Arabic alphabet, but his work was largely overshadowed by the Soviet presence in Central Asia. Subsequently, the new Soviet regime compelled the Kazakhs to adopt a Latin script and, later, a Cyrillic script in the 1940s. Today, Kazakhs use both the Cyrillic and Latin scripts to write their language, although a presidential decree issued in 2017 ordered the transition from Cyrillic to Latin by 2031.

Although not classified as an endangered language, Kazakh was described in 2024 as being in a somewhat vulnerable position by Kazakhstan's Minister of Science and Higher Education, Sayasat Nurbek, falling into a category where the number of speakers is not increasing as rapidly as had been anticipated.

== Phonology ==
Kazakh exhibits tongue-root vowel harmony, with some words of recent foreign origin (e.g., from Russian, Persian, or Arabic) being exceptions. There is also a system of rounding harmony which resembles that of Kyrgyz, but which does not apply as strongly and is not reflected in the orthography. This system applies only to the mid vowels /e/, /ɘ/, /ə/ (and not /ɑ/), and operates in the following syllables. Thus, jūldyz 'star', bügın 'today', and ülken 'big' are actually pronounced as jūldūz, bügün, and ülkön, respectively.

=== Consonants ===
The following chart depicts the consonant inventory of standard Kazakh; (Note: Some variations occur in different regions where Kazakh is spoken, including outside Kazakhstan; e.g., j/ж/ج is read [ʒ] in the Kazakhstani standard, but may be pronounced [d͡ʒ] in China (Xinjiang), Iran (Golestan), and in southern Kazakhstan (Turkistan).) many of the sounds, however, are allophones of other sounds or appear only in recent loanwords. The 18 consonant phonemes listed by Vajda are without parentheses—since these are phonemes, their listed place and manner of articulation are very general, and will vary from what is shown. (/t͡s/ rarely appears in normal speech.) Kazakh has 19 native consonant phonemes: these are the stops /p, b, t, d, k, ɡ, q/, fricatives /s, z, ʃ, ʒ, ʁ/, nasals /m, n, ŋ/, liquids /r, l/, and two glides /w, j/. The sounds /f, v, χ, h, t͡s, t͡ɕ/ are found only in loanwords. /ʒ/ is heard as an alveolo-palatal affricate [d͡ʒ] in the Kazakh dialects of Uzbekistan and China. The sounds [q] and [ʁ] may be analysed as allophones of /k/ and /ɡ/ in words with back vowels, but exceptions occur in loanwords. (Note: This is indicated in the orthographies of Kazakh, as each pair is represented with different graphemes: q/ق/қ, ğ/ع/ғ for [q, ʁ]; k/ك/к, g/گ/г for [k, g].)

Kazakh consonant phonemes
| | | Labials | Alveolar | (Alveolo-) palatal | Velar | Uvular |
|---|---|---|---|---|---|---|
| Nasal | | m ⟨м/m⟩ | n ⟨н/n⟩ | | ŋ ⟨ң/ñ⟩ | |
| Plosive | voiceless | p ⟨п/p⟩ | t ⟨т/t⟩ | | k ⟨к/k⟩ | q ⟨қ/q⟩ |
| Plosive | voiced | b ⟨б/b⟩ | d ⟨д/d⟩ | | ɡ ⟨г/g⟩ | |
| Fricative | voiceless | | s ⟨с/s⟩ | ɕ ⟨ш/ş⟩ | | |
| Fricative | voiced | | z ⟨з/z⟩ | ʑ ⟨ж/j⟩ | | (ʁ) ⟨ғ/ğ⟩ |
| Approximant | | | l ⟨л/l⟩ | j ⟨й/i⟩ | w ⟨у/u⟩ | |
| Trill | | | r ⟨р/r⟩ | | | |

- Voiced obstruents are devoiced syllable-finally, as normally indicated in the orthography.
- /ŋ/ does not occur in word-initial position.
- /j z r l ʁ/ occur word-initially only in loanwords.
- /l/ is velarized [ɫ] in words with back vowels.
- /p t k q/ are aspirated [pʰ tʰ kʰ qʰ], and the voice onset time is highest in word-initial position. If followed by another obstruent, they may be unreleased [p̚ t̚ k̚ q̚].
- /r/ is often heard as a tap [ɾ] in rural speech, as well as in dialects spoken in China.

=== Vowels ===
Kazakh has a system of roughly eight or nine phonemic vowels. The rounding contrast and /æ/ generally occur only as phonemes in the first syllable of a word, but do occur later allophonically; see the section on harmony below for more information. Moreover, /æ/ has been included artificially due to the influence of Arabic, Persian, and, later, Tatar during the Islamic period. It can be found in some native words, however.

According to Vajda, the front/back quality of vowels is actually one of neutral versus retracted tongue root.

Phonetic values are paired with the corresponding character in Kazakh's Cyrillic and Latin alphabets.

Kazakh vowel phonemes
| | Front | Central | Back |
|---|---|---|---|
| Close | ɪ ⟨і/ı⟩ | ʉ ⟨ү/ü⟩ | ʊ ⟨ұ/ū⟩ |
| Mid | e ⟨э/e⟩ | ə ⟨ы/y⟩ | o ⟨о/o⟩ |
| Open | æ ⟨ә/ä⟩ | ɵ ⟨ө/ö⟩ | ɑ ⟨а/a⟩ |

Kazakh vowels by their pronunciation
| | Front and central | | Back | |
| | unrounded | rounded | unrounded | rounded |
|---|---|---|---|---|
| Close | ɪ ⟨і/ı⟩ | ʉ ⟨ү/ü⟩ | ə ⟨ы/y⟩ | ʊ ⟨ұ/ū⟩ |
| Open | (j)e ⟨е/e⟩ / æ ⟨ә/ä⟩ | ɵ ⟨ө/ö⟩ | ɑ ⟨а/a⟩ | o ⟨о/o⟩ |

- There is significant debate over the Kazakh vowel chart, but many analyses agree on an eight-vowel system with [æ] being artificially added due to influence from Arabic and Persian.
- The vowel /e/ is often pronounced as the diphthong [je] at the beginning of words, with the exception of root e-. Urban Kazakh speakers have a greater tendency to palatalize all /e/, caused by Russian influence.
- Some analyses include the vowels /ij/ and /uw/, resulting in an 11-vowel system. Other analyses analyze these as sequences of vowels with /j/ or /w/, respectively, since they can be either front or back in vowel harmony.

=== Vowel harmony ===
Kazakh exhibits tongue-root vowel harmony (also called soft-hard harmony), and arguably weakened rounding harmony, which is implied in the first syllable of the word. All vowels after the first rounded syllable are subject to this harmony, with the exception of /ɑ/, and in the following syllables—e.g., өмір [wɵˈmʉr], қосы [qʰoˈsʊ]. Notably, urban Kazakh speakers tend to violate rounding harmony, as well as pronouncing Russian borrowings against the rules.

=== Syllable structure ===
Kazakh's syllable structure is (C)V(C)(C). Syllables containing consonant clusters CC typically consist of a combination of a sonorant (/r, l, n, j/) and a stop (mainly /t/). Other types of syllables are also permitted due to recent loanwords, mainly from Russian.

=== Stress ===
Most words in Kazakh are stressed in the last syllable, except:

- When counting objects, numbers are stressed in the first syllable, but stressed in the last syllable in collective numbers suffixed by -eu/au (bıreu, altau from bır, alty):

bır, ekı, üş, tört, bes, alty, jetı, ...
'one, two, three, four, five, six, seven, ...'

- Definite and negative pronouns are stressed in the first syllable:

bärıne eşkımge
'to everyone, to no one'

- Individual onomatopoeic words and interjections are stressed on the first syllable
- Certain suffixes do not take stress, including:
  - the predicate suffixes -mın/-myn, -sıñ/-syñ, -mız/-myz (e.g., baqyttymyz [bɑχə̆tˈtʰəməz] 'we are happy', balasyñ [bɑˈɫɑsəŋ] 'you're a child')
  - the suffixes -dei/-dai, -tei/-tai (e.g., börıdei [bɵˈrʉdʲej] 'like a wolf')
  - the optative suffix -iın/-iyn (e.g., jazaiyn [ʒɑˈzɑjən] 'let's write')
  - the negative suffixes -me/-ma, -be/-ba, -pe/-pa (e.g., jylama [ʒəˈɫɑmɑ] 'don't cry', qoryqpa [qʰoˈrʊqpʰɑ] 'fear not')
  - particles and postpositions -şı/-şy (e.g., qaraşy! [qʰɑˈrɑʃə] 'look!'), ğoi, etc.

== Orthography ==
Nowadays, Kazakh is mostly written in the Cyrillic script, with an Arabic-based alphabet being used by Kazakh speakers in China. On 26 October 2017, by Presidential Decree 569, Kazakhstan announced that it would adopt the Latin script by 2025. However, this transition has since been delayed.

Since the Cyrillic alphabet was originally designed for Slavic languages, it had to be modified to better fit the sounds of Turkic languages such as Kazakh. Several new letters were added, and some existing ones were modified: ә, ғ, қ, ң, ө, ұ, ү, һ, і.

The Cyrillic letter у, when following a consonant, represents a combination of sounds /ɘ/, /ʉ/, ы /ə/, or /ʊ/ with the glide /w/, for example: кіру [kʰɘˈrɘw], су [sʊw], көру [kʰɵˈrʉw], and атысу [ɑtʰə̆ˈsəw]. The Cyrillic letter ю undergoes the same process but with /j/ at the beginning.

The letter и represents a combination of sounds /ɘ/ (in front-vowel contexts) or /ə/ (in back vowel contexts) with the glide /j/, e.g., тиіс [tʰɘˈjɘ̆s], оқиды [woqʰəjˈdə]. In Russian loanwords, particularly in educated speech, it is often realised as /ʲi/ (when stressed) or /ʲɪ/ (when unstressed), e.g., изоморфизм [ɪzəmɐrˈfʲizm].

The letter я represents either /jɑ/ or /jæ/ depending on vowel harmony.

The letter щ represents /ʃː/, e.g. ащы [ɑʃˈʃə].

Meanwhile, the letters в, ё, ф, х, һ, ц, ч, ъ, ь, and э are used only in loanwords—mostly those of Russian origin, but sometimes of Persian and Arabic origin as well. They are often substituted in spoken Kazakh.

The table below compares the various scripts.

| IPA | Cyrillic | Latin | | | Arabic | | Braille |
| IPA | Cyrillic | 2021 | 2018 | 2017 | Letter | Name | Braille |
|---|---|---|---|---|---|---|---|
| [ɑ] | А а | A a | | | ا | Alif | ⠁ |
| [æ] | Ә ә | Ä ä | Á á | A' a' | ٵ | Hamza + Alif | ⠜ |
| [b] | Б б | B b | | | ب | Ba | ⠃ |
| [v] | В в | V v | | | ۆ | Waw with háček | ⠺ |
| [g] | Г г | G g | | | گ | Gaf | ⠛ |
| [ʁ] | Ғ ғ | Ğ ğ | Ǵ ǵ | G' g' | غ | Ghain | ⠻ |
| [d] | Д д | D d | | | د | Dal | ⠙ |
| [(j)e] | Е е | E e | | | ە | Ha | ⠑ |
| [jo] | Ё ё | İo io | Io ıo | —N/a | (يو) | Ya + Waw | ⠡ |
| [(d)ʒ] | Ж ж | J j | | | ج | Jeem | ⠚ |
| [z] | З з | Z z | | | ز | Za | ⠵ |
| [əj, ɘj, i] | И и | İ i | I ı | I' i' | ي | Ya | ⠊ |
| [j] | Й й | İ i | I ı | I' i' | ي | Ya | ⠽ |
| [k] | К к | K k | | | ك | Kaf | ⠅ |
| [q] | Қ қ | Q q | | | ق | Qaf | ⠹ |
| [l~ɫ] | Л л | L l | | | ل | Lam | ⠇ |
| [m] | М м | M m | | | م | Meem | ⠍ |
| [n] | Н н | N n | | | ن | Noon | ⠝ |
| [ŋ~ɴ] | Ң ң | Ñ ñ | Ń ń | N' n' | ڭ | Kaf with three dots | ⠩ |
| [(w)o] | О о | O o | | | و | Waw | ⠕ |
| [(w)ɵ] | Ө ө | Ö ö | Ó ó | O' o' | ٶ | Hamza + Waw | ⠣ |
| [p] | П п | P p | | | پ | Pa | ⠏ |
| [ɾ~r] | Р р | R r | | | ر | Ra | ⠗ |
| [s] | С с | S s | | | س | Seen | ⠎ |
| [t] | Т т | T t | | | ت | Ta | ⠞ |
| [(V)w, u] | У у | U u | Ý ý | Y' y' | ۋ | Waw with 3 dots | ⠥ |
| [ʊ] | Ұ ұ | Ū ū | U u | | ۇ | Waw with damma | ⠌ |
| [ʉ] | Ү ү | Ü ü | Ú ú | U' u' | ٷ | Hamza + Waw with damma | ⠬ |
| [f] | Ф ф | F f | | | ف | Fa | ⠋ |
| [h] | Һ һ | H h | | | ھ | Ha | ⠓ |
| [χ] | Х х | H h | | | خ | Kha | ⠓ |
| [ts] | Ц ц | Ts ts | S s | —N/a | (تس) | Ta + Seen | ⠉ |
| [tɕ] | Ч ч | Tş tş | Ch ch | C' c' | چ | Cheem | ⠟ |
| [ʃ] | Ш ш | Ş ş | Sh sh | S' s' | ش | Sheen | ⠱ |
| [ɕː] | Щ щ | Ştş ştş | Shch shch | —N/a | (شش) | Sheen + Sheen | ⠭ |
| —N/a | Ъ ъ | —N/a | | | | | ⠷ |
| [ə] | Ы ы | Y y | | | ى | Alif maqṣūrah | ⠮ |
| [ɘ] | І і | I ı | I i | | ئ | Hamza + Ya | ⠊ |
| —N/a | Ь ь | —N/a | | | | | ⠾ |
| [e~ɛ] | Э э | E e | | —N/a | (ە) | Ha | ⠪ |
| [jʊ] | Ю ю | İu iu | Iý ıý | —N/a | ( يۋ ) | Ya + Waw with damma | ⠳ |
| [jɑ] | Я я | İa ia | Ia ıa | —N/a | (يا) | Ya + Alif | ⠫ |

== Grammar ==
Kazakh is generally verb-final, though various permutations of the SOV (subject–object–verb) word order can be used, for example, as a result of topicalization. Inflectional and derivational morphology, both verbal and nominal, in Kazakh, exists almost exclusively in the form of agglutinative suffixes. Kazakh is a nominative-accusative, head-final, left-branching, dependent-marking language.

=== Nouns ===
Kazakh has no noun class or gender system. Nouns are declined for number (singular or plural) and one of seven cases:

- Nominative
- Accusative
- Genitive
- Dative
- Locative
- Ablative
- Instrumental

The suffix for case is placed after the suffix for number.

Declension of nouns for case
| Case | Morpheme | Possible forms | keme 'ship' | aua 'air' | şelek 'bucket' | säbız 'carrot' | bas 'head' | tūz 'salt' | qan 'blood' | kün 'day' |
|---|---|---|---|---|---|---|---|---|---|---|
| Nom | — | — | keme | aua | şelek | säbız | bas | tūz | qan | kün |
| Acc | -ny | -nı, -ny, -dı, -dy, -tı, -ty | keme**nı** | aua**ny** | şelek**tı** | säbız**dı** | bas**ty** | tūz**dy** | qan**dy** | kün**dı** |
| Gen | -nyñ | -nıñ, -nyñ, -dıñ, -dyñ, -tıñ, -tyñ | keme**nıñ** | aua**nyñ** | şelek**tıñ** | säbız**dıñ** | bas**tyñ** | tūz**dyñ** | qan**nyñ** | kün**nıñ** |
| Dat | -ga | -ge, -ğa, -ke, -qa | keme**ge** | aua**ğa** | şelek**ke** | säbız**ge** | bas**qa** | tūz**ğa** | qan**ğa** | kün**ge** |
| Loc | -da | -de, -da, -te, -ta | keme**de** | aua**da** | şelek**te** | säbız**de** | bas**ta** | tūz**da** | qan**da** | kün**de** |
| Abl | -dan | -den, -dan, -ten, -tan, -nen, -nan | keme**den** | aua**dan** | şelek**ten** | säbız**den** | bas**tan** | tūz**dan** | qan**nan** | kün**nen** |
| Inst | -men | -men(en), -ben(en), -pen(en) | keme**men** | aua**men** | şelek**pen** | säbız**ben** | bas**pen** | tūz**ben** | qan**men** | kün**men** |

Declension of nouns for number
| | Morpheme | Possible Forms | bala 'child' | kirpi 'hedgehog' | qazaq 'Kazakh' | mektep 'school' | adam 'person' | gül 'flower' | söz 'word' |
|---|---|---|---|---|---|---|---|---|---|
| singular | – | – | bala | kirpi | qazaq | mektep | adam | gül | söz |
| plural | -lar | -lar, -ler, -ter, -tar, -der, -dar | bala**lar** | kirpi**ler** | qazaq**tar** | mektep**ter** | adam**dar** | gül**der** | söz**der** |

Additionally, there exist inflectional suffixes, which can be attached to nouns:

- -dai/-dei/-tai/-tei
- -syz/-sız

The suffixes -dai/-dei/-tai/-tei serve a role similar to that of the semblative case.

| Possible Forms | adam 'human' | teñız 'sea' | araq 'vodka' | şelek 'bucket' |
|---|---|---|---|---|
| -dai, -dei, -tai, -tei | adam**dai** | teñız**dei** | araq**tai** | şelek**tei** |

The suffixes -syz/-sız serve a role similar to that of the abessive case.

| Possible Forms | qalam 'pen' | kölık 'vehicle' |
|---|---|---|
| -syz, -sız | qalam**syz** | kölık**sız** |

=== Pronouns ===
There are eight personal pronouns in Kazakh:

Personal pronouns
| | | Singular | Plural |
|---|---|---|---|
| 1st person | | men | bız |
| 2nd person | informal | sen | sender |
| 2nd person | formal | sız | sızder |
| 3rd person | | ol | olar |

The declension of the pronouns is outlined in the following chart. Singular pronouns exhibit irregularities, while plural pronouns do not. Irregular forms are highlighted in bold.

| Number | Singular | | | | Plural | | | |
| Person | 1st | 2nd | | 3rd | 1st | 2nd | | 3rd |
| Person | 1st | Familiar | Polite | 3rd | 1st | Familiar | Polite | 3rd |
|---|---|---|---|---|---|---|---|---|
| Nominative | men | sen | sız | ol | bız | sender | sızder | olar |
| Genitive | **menıñ** | **senıñ** | sızdıñ | **onyñ** | bızdıñ | senderdıñ | sızderdıñ | olardyñ |
| Dative | **mağan** | **sağan** | sızge | **oğan** | bızge | senderge | sızderge | olarğa |
| Accusative | **menı** | **senı** | sızdı | **ony** | bızdı | senderdı | sızderdı | olardy |
| Locative | mende | sende | sızde | onda | bızde | senderde | sızderde | olarda |
| Ablative | **menen** | **senen** | sızden | **odan** | bızden | senderden | sızderden | olardan |
| Instrumental | **menımen** | **senımen** | sızben | **onymen** | bızben | sendermen | sızdermen | olarmen |

Additionally, the 3rd person singular exhibits irregularities for the inflectional suffixes -dai/-dei/-tai/-tei and -syz/-sız:

- on**dai**
- on**syz**

In addition to the pronouns, there are several more sets of morphemes dealing with person.

Morphemes indicating person
| | Pronouns | Copulas | Possessive endings | Past/Conditional |
|---|---|---|---|---|
| 1st sg | men | -mın/-myn | -(ı)m/-(y)m | -(ı)m/-(y)m |
| 2nd sg | sen | -sıñ/-syñ | -(ı)ñ/-(y)ñ | -(ı)ñ |
| 2nd sg formal | sız | -sız/-syz | -(ı)ñız/-(y)ñyz | -(ı)ñız/-(y)ñyz |
| 3rd sg | ol | – | -(s)ı/-(s)y | – |
| 1st pl | bız | -mız/-myz | -(ı)mız/-(y)myz | -(ı)k/-(y)q |
| 2nd pl | sender | -sıñder/-syñdar | -laryñ/-lerıñ | -(ı)ñder/-(y)ñdar |
| 2nd pl formal | sızder | -sızder/-syzdar | -(ı)ñız/-(y)ñyz | -(ı)ñızder/-(y)ñyzdar |
| 3rd pl | olar | – | -lary/-lerı | – |

=== Adjectives ===
Adjectives in Kazakh are not declined for any grammatical category of the modified noun. Being a head-final language, adjectives are always placed before the noun that they modify. Kazakh has two varieties of adjectives:

- **Qualitative** – used to describe properties of the noun, such as color
- **Relational** – adjectives formed from words from other parts of speech

=== Degrees of comparison ===
==== Comparative ====
The comparative form can be created by appending the suffix -(y)raq/-(ı)rek or -tau/-teu/-dau/-dau to an adjective.

==== Superlative ====
The superlative form can be created by placing the morpheme eñ before the adjective. The superlative form can also be expressed by reduplication.

=== Verbs ===
Kazakh may express different combinations of tense, aspect, and mood through the use of various verbal morphology or through a system of auxiliary verbs, many of which might better be considered light verbs. The present tense is a prime example of this: the progressive tense in Kazakh is formed with one of four possible auxiliaries. These auxiliaries—otyr 'sit', tūr 'stand', jür 'go', and jat 'lie'—encode various shades of meaning regarding how the action is carried out, and also interact with the lexical semantics of the root verb: telic and non-telic actions, semelfactives, durative and non-durative, punctual, and so on. There are selectional restrictions on auxiliaries: motion verbs, such as бару 'go' and келу 'come', may not combine with otyr. However, any verb can combine with jat 'lie' to express a progressive tense meaning.

Progressive aspect in the present tense
| Kazakh | Aspect | English translation |
|---|---|---|
| Men jüzemın | non-progressive | 'I (will) swim [every day].' |
| Men jüzıp jatyrmyn | progressive | 'I am swimming [right now].' |
| Men jüzıp otyrmyn | progressive/durative | 'I am [sitting and] swimming. / I have been swimming.' |
| Men jüzıp tūrmyn | progressive/punctual | 'I am [in the middle of] swimming [this very minute].' |
| Men jüzıp jürmın | habitual | 'I swim [frequently/regularly]' |

While it is possible to think that different categories of aspect govern the choice of auxiliary, it is not so straightforward in Kazakh. Auxiliaries are internally sensitive to the lexical semantics of predicates, for example, verbs describing motion:

Selectional restrictions on Kazakh auxiliaries
| Sentence | Auxiliary Used |
|---|---|
| Suda balyq jüzedı water-LOC fish swim-PRES-3 'Fish swim in water' (general statement) | ∅ (present/future tense used) |
| Suda balyq jüzıp jatyr water-LOC fish swim-CVB AUX.3 'The/A fish is swimming in the water' | **jat**－ 'to lie', general marker for progressive aspect. |
| Suda balyq jüzıp jür water-LOC fish swim-CVB AUX.3 'The fish is swimming [as it always does] in the water' | **jür** – 'go', dynamic/habitual/iterative |
| Suda balyq jüzıp tūr water-LOC fish swim-CVB AUX.3 'The fish is swimming in the water' | **tūr** – 'stand', progressive marker to show the swimming is punctual |
| * Suda balyq jüzıp otyr {} water-LOC fish swim-CVB AUX.3; *The fish has been swimming Not a possible sentence in Kazakh | **otyr** – 'sit', ungrammatical in this sentence; otyr can only be used for verbs that are stative in nature |

In addition to the complexities of the progressive tense, there are many auxiliary-converb pairs that encode a range of aspectual, modal, volitional, evidential and action- modificational meanings. For example, the pattern verb + köru, with the auxiliary verb köru 'see', indicates that the subject of the verb attempted or tried to do something (compare the Japanese てみる temiru construction).

== Annotated text with gloss ==
From the first stanza and refrain of "Menıñ Qazaqstanym" ("My Kazakhstan"), the national anthem of Kazakhstan:

| Менің Қазақстаным | Men-ıñ Qazaqstan-ym |
|---|---|
| {Алтын күн} аспаны [ɑ̝ɫ̪ˈt̪ʰə̃ŋ‿kʰʏ̞̃n̪ ɑ̝s̪pʰɑ̝̃ˈn̪ə] | Altyn kün aspan-y gold sun sky-3.POSS 'Sky of the golden sun' |
| Алтын дән даласы [ɑ̝ɫ̪ˈt̪ʰə̃n̪‿d̪æ̝̃n̪ d̪ɑ̝ɫ̪ɑ̝ˈs̪ə |] | Altyn dän dala-sy gold grain steppe-3.POSS 'Steppe of the golden grain' |
| Ерліктің дастаны [je̘r̪l̪ɪ̞k̚ˈt̪ʰɪ̞̃ŋ̟ d̪ɑ̝s̪t̪ʰɑ̝̃ˈn̪ə] | Erlık-tıñ dastan-y {courage legend-GEN} epic-3.POSS-NOM 'The legend of courage' |
| Еліме қарашы! [je̘l̪ɪ̞̃ˈmʲe̘ qʰɑ̝ˈr̪ɑ̝ʃə ‖] | El-ım-e qara-şy country-1SG.DAT look-IMP 'Look at my country!' |
| Ежелден ер деген [je̘ʒʲe̘l̪ʲˈd̪ʲẽ̘n̪ je̘r̪ d̪ʲe̘ˈɡʲẽ̘n̪] | Ejel-den er de-gen antiquity-ABL hero say-PTCP.PST 'Called heroes since ancient times' |
| Даңқымыз шықты ғой [d̪ɑ̝̃ɴqʰə̃ˈməz̪ ʃəq̚ˈt̪ʰə ʁo̞j |] | Dañq-ymyz şyq-ty ğoi glory-1PL.POSS.NOM emerge-PST.3 EMPH 'Our glory emerged!' |
| Намысын бермеген [n̪ɑ̝̃məˈs̪ə̃m‿bʲe̘r̪mʲe̘ˈɡʲẽ̘n̪] | Namys-yn ber-me-gen honor-3.POSS-ACC give-NEG-PTCP.PST 'They did not give up their honor' |
| Қазағым мықты ғой [qʰɑ̝z̪ɑ̝ˈʁə̃m məq̚ˈt̪ʰə ʁo̞j ‖] | Qazağ-ym myqty ğoi Kazakh-1SG.POSS strong EMPH 'My Kazakhs are mighty!' |
| Менің елім, менің елім [mʲẽ̘ˈn̪ɪ̞̃ŋ̟ je̘ˈl̪ɪ̞̃m | mʲẽ̘ˈn̪ɪ̞̃ŋ̟ je̘ˈl̪ɪ̞̃m |] | Men-ıñ el-ım, menıñ el-ım 1SG.GEN country-1SG.NOM 1SG.GEN country-1SG.NOM 'My country, my country' |
| Гүлің болып, егілемін [ɡʏ̞ˈl̪ʏ̞̃m‿bo̞ˈɫ̪ʊp | je̘ɣɪ̞ˈl̪ʲẽ̘mɪ̞̃n̪ |] | Gül-ıñ bol-yp, eg-ıl-e-mın flower-2SG.NOM be-CVB, root-PASS-PRES-1SG 'As your flower, I am rooted in you' |
| Жырың болып төгілемін, елім [ʒəˈr̪ə̃m bo̞ˈɫ̪ʊp | t̪ʰɵɣʏ̞ˈl̪ʲẽ̘mɪ̞̃n̪ je̘ˈl̪ɪ̞̃m |] | Jyr-yñ bol-yp, tög-ıl-e-mın, el-ım song-2SG.NOM be-CVB, sing-PASS-PRES-1SG, country-1SG.POSS.NOM 'As your song, I shall be sung abound' |
| Туған жерім менің – Қазақстаным [t̪ʰuˈʁɑ̝̃n̪‿d͡ʒʲe̘ˈr̪ɪ̞̃m mʲẽ̘ˈn̪ɪ̞̃ŋ̟ | qʰɑ̝ˌz̪ɑ̝ʁə̆s̪t̪ʰɑ̝̃ˈn̪ə̃m ‖] | Tu-ğan jer-ım menıñ – Qazaqstan-ym birth-PTCP-PST place-1SG.POSS.NOM 1SG.GEN – Kazakhstan-1SG.POSS.NOM 'My native land – My Kazakhstan' |

== See also ==
- Kazakh alphabets
- Kazakh literature
- Kazakh Sign Language
