= Galina Zaitseva =

Russian teacher of the Deaf (1934–2005)

- Галина Зайцева
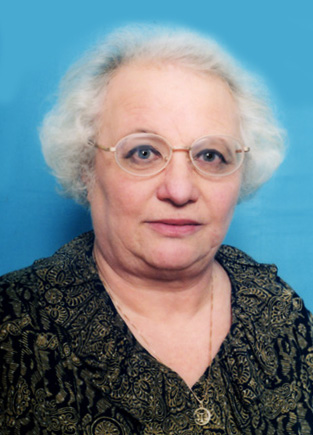
- Born: 12 October 1934; Moscow, USSR
- Died: 6 August 2005 (aged 70); Moscow, Russia
- Resting place: Vostryakovo Cemetery, Moscow
- Education: Moscow State V. I. Lenin Pedagogical Institute
- Occupations: Teacher; Deaf studies researcher
- Years active: 1956–2005
- Known for: Developing bilingual Deaf education

Galina Lazarevna Zaitseva (Russian: Галина Лазаревна Зайцева; 12 October 1934 – 6 August 2005) was a Russian teacher known for her research of sign language and Deaf history and culture. She was one of the key early advocates for what became codified as Russian Sign Language.

== Biography ==
Zaitseva was born in Moscow, into a secular Jewish family. Her father, Lazar Abramovich Zaitsev, was a bridge engineer who had moved to Moscow from Vitebsk. He enlisted in the Red Army at the beginning of World War II, and was killed in Lithuania in 1944. Zaitseva's mother, Sofia Emirovna Zaitseva (née Istkova), was a musician by training who primarily raised Zaitseva and her younger brother, Vladimir.

Zaitseva did well in her studies and after finishing school, studied defectology at Moscow State V. I. Lenin Pedagogical Institute; in 1956, she graduated with a degree in Russian language and literature. She went on to work as a Russian language and literature teacher at the Liubliono School for Deaf Children.

In 1966, Zaitseva enrolled in graduate school at the Research Institute of Defectology within the Academy of Pedagogical Sciences of the USSR, where she was supervised by N. F. Slezina. In 1969, she defended her dissertation, entitled "Expression of spatial relationships in the facial-gestural speech of the Deaf". Zaitseva spent the following thirty years working as a research at the institute (today known as the Institute of Complex Problems of the Russian Academy of Education), leaving in 1993. During the 1980s, her doctoral research, entitled "Sign speech in the system of teaching and upbringing of adult Deaf people", caused debate in the scientific and pedagogical community; Zaitseva successfully defended her thesis in 1988.

In 1991, Zaitseva completed an internship in the United Kingdom at the University of Bristol's Centre for the Study of Deafness, where she studied bilingual approaches to Deaf education and participated in a project to teach Russian Sign Language to hearing people. In 1992, Zaitseva founded the first bilingual school for Deaf people, the Moscow Bilingual School for the Deaf, based within the School for the Deaf No. 65 in Moscow, where classes were taught by both Deaf and hearing teachers. The first pupils from the school graduated in 1998.

From 1993, Zaitseva worked as a professor within the Faculty of Special Education and Special Psychology at Moscow State Pedagogical University, teaching the history of Deaf pedagogy, verbal and non-verbal communication methods and sociolinguistics. She also organised the first sign language teacher training programme in Russia.

Zaitseva championed the concept of bilingualism within Deaf education, and was among the first Russian pedagogists to call for Deaf teachers to play a role in the education of Deaf children. She also advocated for Deaf people to participate in the research of sign languages and psycholinguistics. Zaitseva organised many conferences on the bilingual education of the Deaf. Zaitseva was named an expert by the World Federation of the Deaf.

Zaitseva published 80 scientific papers on sign language and Deaf history, culture and education. She published the book Dactylology and Signed Speech (1992). A posthumous collection of her work, entitled The Gesture and the World, was published following her death.

Zaitseva died on 6 August 2005. Her funeral was held on 15 September at Vostriakovo Cemetery in Moscow.

== Scientific views ==
Zaitseva spent many years researching sign language and Deaf pedagogy. She has been cited as playing a key role in a shift in attitudes within Russia towards the use of Russian Sign Language and contributing to significant advances in Deaf education. She used the sign for "hare" as her sign name, with her surname coming from the Russian word "zaiats", meaning "hare"; she was affectionately known as "Professor Zaiats".

Zaitseva described sign languages as a "rich communicative system" that deserved as much respect as spoken languages. In 1992, Zaitseva devised the Russian-language term for Russian Sign Language (русский жестовый язык, russkiy zhestovyy yazyk). She categorised Russian Sign Language into two types: RSL, a language spoken by Deaf people with its own grammar, vocabulary and developmental history distinct from spoken Russian; and calqued sign language (калькирующий жестовый язык, kalkiruyushchiy zhestovyy yazyk, KZhL), the literal translation of spoken Russian words into signs, which was often used by sign language interpreters in state media. She also researched the use of fingerspelling to denote unknown proper names or new concepts of reality.

Zaitseva called for Deaf children to be educated in both Russian Sign Language, their native language, which she felt helped them "fully communicate and grasp the realities of this world"; and also spoken Russian. While she promoted bilingualism in her work, Zaitseva also researched alternative methods of Deaf education. She advocated against the shift from sign oralism in the education of the Deaf.

Zaitseva researched sign language vocabulary, including synonyms and non-equivalent vocabulary, and developed educational programmes for Deaf children of varying ages.

In recognition of her research, the Galina Zaitseva Centre for Deaf Studies and Sign Language, founded by Zaitseva's friend A. A. Komarova, was named after her.
