= Estonian Sign Language =

National sign language of Estonia

- eesti viipekeel (EVK)
- Native to: Estonia
- Native speakers: 1,500 (2011)
- Language family: probably French Sign Language family: probably Russian Sign Language; Estonian Sign Language

Language codes
- ISO 639-3: eso
- Glottolog: esto1238
- ELP: Estonian Sign Language

Estonian Sign Language (Estonian: eesti viipekeel, EVK) is the national sign language of Estonia.

== History and character ==
Research into the origins and nature of EVK did not begin until the late 1980s, so many details remain unknown. Ulrike Zeshan (2005) concluded that, based on the historical influence of the German and Russian communist oral methods of deaf education, the fact that the first deaf school in Estonia was established in 1866 in Vändra in the Governorate of Livonia of the Russian Empire and the evident influence of Russian Sign Language (RSL) present in EVK, it most likely either derived from or was strongly influenced by RSL, thus making Estonian Sign Language a member of the French Sign Language family.

Taniroo (2007) found that 61% of Estonian and Russian signs of the 200-word Swadesh list were identical, confirming the hypothesis that EVK is either related to or has been significantly influenced by RSL through language contact. However, as of 2016 there were 'no studies comparing EVK vocabulary with any other sign languages than Russian SL.' Although the spoken and written Estonian and Finnish languages are closely related Finno-Ugric languages and there are some notable and probable Finnish Sign Language influences on EVK, there seems to have been 'no considerable historical language contact between EVK and Finnish Sign Language' (Hollman 2016). In the unlikely event that EVK originally derived from Finnish Sign Language, it would belong to the Swedish Sign Language family.

Mahoney (2017) conducted the first-known 100-word Swadesh–Woodward list comparison of EVK and Latvian Sign Language, concluding that a possible relationship between them – as descending from VLFS, perhaps via ÖGS and/or RSL, as Wittmann (1991) and Bickford (2005) proposed – was 'still uncertain as it is unclear how sign languages disseminated in Eastern European countries during the Soviet Union, but aside from superficial impressions that the core lexicons are similar, signs with shared parameters displaying small variation in handshape while retaining 4 selected fingers suggests that these languages share a parent'. She added that '[a]t present there is no reason to assume that Estonian and Latvian sign language have a mother-daughter relationship'.

In its formative stages, Estonian Sign Language was influenced by Russian and Finnish Sign Language; for example, the EVK sign for 'butterfly' developed from the Finnish sign for 'bird'. There are several dialects, the most archaic of which is the Pärnu variety. Like other sign languages, EVK is influenced by the local oral language. For instance, some signs are based on fingerspelling the first letter of an Estonian word, as in the sign for restoran, meaning 'restaurant'.

== Current status ==
Instruction for parents of deaf children is available in Tallinn. Teaching and research began in 1990 at Tartu University.

In 1998 there were about 4,500 signers out of a deaf population of 2000 and a hearing-impaired population ten times that number. It is widespread in the cities of Tallinn and Pärnu among deaf ethnic Estonians; deaf Russians in Tallinn use Russian Sign Language, Russians outside Tallinn tend to use a Russian–Estonian Sign Language pidgin, or may be bilingual.

Estonian Sign Language was recognised as an independent language in 2007 under the Language Act.
