= Russian Sign Language =

Sign language of the deaf community in Russia

- русский жестовый язык, РЖЯ russkiy zhestovyi yazyk
- Native to: Russia, Tajikistan, Belarus, Kazakhstan, Kyrgyzstan
- Region: Russia
- Signers: 120,000 in Russia (2010 census)
- Language family: French Sign: Austro-Hungarian Sign; Russian Sign Language
- Dialects: Kazakh Sign Language; Uzbek Sign Language

Language codes
- ISO 639-3: rsl
- Glottolog: russ1270

Russian Sign Language (RSL; Russian: Русский жестовый язык, РЖЯ) is the sign language used by the Deaf community in Russia, with what is possibly additional presence in Belarus and Tajikistan. It belongs to the French Sign Language family.

RSL is a natural language with a grammar that differs from spoken or written Russian language. Signed Russian is an artificial form of communication used in schools and differs from RSL in strictly following Russian grammar.

Although RSL is legally recognized in Russia, it does not enjoy state support and there is a lack of skilled RSL interpreters in the country.

== History ==
Russian fairytale "The Wolf and the Fox" in Russian Sign Language.

In 1806, the first Russian deaf school was founded near Saint Petersburg. It is believed that RSL belongs to the French sign language family due to the fact that the first two sign language teachers were from France and Austria. Beyond a speaker base in Israel, researchers do not know for sure if RSL is used outside of Russia; it may also be used in Ukraine, Belarus or Tajikistan.

Much of the early research on RSL was done by Galina Zaitseva, who wrote her 1969 PhD thesis on spatial relationships in Russian Sign Language, and in 1992 devised the now standard term for Russian Sign Language (Русский жестовый язык).

== Sociolinguistic status ==
Most deaf people in Russia are born to hearing families and therefore are not provided the opportunity to acquire a native-like command of RSL. Bilingualism between RSL and written or spoken Russian is very common.

Signed Russian differs from RSL in that it is an artificial form of communication which closely follows Russian word order and adds Russian grammatical features not found in RSL. Sign Russian has a higher social status than RSL because of its association with literacy and higher education. This higher status is due to educational policies, such the near-exclusive use of Signed Russian at deaf schools by teachers. Many Deaf RSL users see their language as a jargon without grammar. These social factors have caused RSL to be significantly influenced by Russian in its vocabulary and some syntactic structures as well.

There appears to be a relatively significant amount of regional variation in RSL comparable to regional variants of Polish Sign Language or Estonian Sign Language. One study reported lexical similarity between two Russian signers at around 70–80%.

== Grammar ==
=== Syntax ===
The basic word orders in RSL appears to be SVO and SOV. A 2012 study found that that subject came before the predicate 95% of the time. Additionally, the object was placed before the verb 74-81% of the time. In situations where the subject and object can switch places, SVO word order is preferred; the same can be said for sentences with animate objects. Topicalization, marked either by lowered eyebrows and a head nod or just raised eyebrows, introduces previously mentioned information. Although RSL lacks determiners, pointing signs can act like demonstratives to mark definiteness. Lexical signs may also be doubled in the sentence to add emphasis or to foreground something (see below).

MEET IX POSS FRIEND MEET
He met his friend.

Verbs may take one, two or no arguments at all in RSL. There are also several alternations that change the argument structure in predictable ways. Examples of this include impersonal, reciprocal and causative constructions. In this respect RSL is typologically similar to other languages.

Classifier predicates are highly iconic verbal signs in which the handshape represents an object and the movement expresses how the object moves. RSL classifier predicates use SOV word order and do not seem to be intrinsically associated with particular argument structures.

=== Morphology ===
Whereas tense is marked analytically or lexically, aspectual distinctions are marked morphologically. Examples of the latter include repeating the sign to indicate habituality, slow movement for durativity, and a single quick movement for completivity.

Adjectives and temporal adverbials along with negative, tense markers all come after the base of the sign. Question words tend to come at the end of the sentence. The plural may be marked either by doubling the sign or by signing MNOGO 'many' or RAZNYJ 'various' after the base sign. A dual meaning of the noun can be expressed by signing the predicate with both hands. Naturally masculine signs are signed at the upper part of the face whereas feminine ones are signed on the lower part of the face.

=== Phonology ===
Similar to other sign languages, RSL makes extensive use of facial expressions for grammatical purposes and signs are either performed with one or both hands. An example of the former include a headshake, furrowed eyebrows and wrinkled nose for negation. This form of negation must include the manual sign NOT, but the facial element may spread to other parts of the sentence.

A 2019 study identified 116 handshapes in a corpus of more than 5000 images, 23 of which were phonologically distinct.

== Legal status ==
The current legal status of RSL is as follows:

1. The Russian Federation provides services for sign language for rehabilitation measures.
2. The current status of Russian Sign Language is extremely low. According to article 14 of the Russian Federal Law, entitled "Social protection of the disabled in the Russian Federation", sign language is recognized as a means of interpersonal communication. Although it is recognized, there is no state support, despite Articles 3, 5, 14, and 19 of the Russian Federal Law, which claim to provide necessary services to the deaf.

There are several problems concerning the study and application of sign language in Russia, which Valery Nikitich Rukhledev, President of the All-Russian Society of the Deaf cited:

1. The instruction of sign language interpreters is an old, long-established program, and they study some signs that have long fallen into disuse or have changed in meaning or form. Because of this, interpreters have difficulty understanding the deaf who try to use their services.
2. Until 1990, the sign language interpreter trade unions had 5,500 translators, of whom 1,000 worked in the system of our organization. Now, thanks to the federal target program "Social Support of Disabled," we manage to keep translators at 800. But the shortage of interpreters remains at about 5,000 people.
3. Today, the Russian Federation only trains sign language interpreters with the issuance of state diplomas from the inter-regional center for the medical rehabilitation of persons with hearing disabilities center in St. Petersburg. Eliminating the existing deficit of sign language interpreters in a country like Russia is impossible with only one training center. It is necessary to train more specialists and to have them in distant regions of the country.

However, there is hope that the situation can change. On 4 April 2009, at the Russian Council on The Disabled, President Dmitry Medvedev discussed the issue of the status of sign language in Russia. In his closing remarks, the President of the Russian Federation expressed his opinion:

"There is indeed, a distinct lack of sign language translators. This level of need necessitates changes. There are considerations and proposals for implementation to resolve the need of training sign language interpreters to provide translation services. But I agree with what has been said: it is necessary to reconsider the preparation of the interpreters at the Ministry of Education Institutions and universities. These teachers should be prepared in virtually every federal district, because we have a huge country and it is impossible to imagine having all sign language interpreters trained in Moscow, for example, and this is the only way we can solve this problem. I am glad that the State Duma supported the initiatives of the President, so we will continue to work in the same unity, in which we have previously worked to resolve this issue."

== Use in films ==
- Страна глухих (Country of the Deaf) (1998)
- Свадьба тишины (Wedding of Silence) (2004)
- Пыль (Dust) (2005)

== See also ==
- Russian Manual Alphabet
