= Anindya Bhattacharyya =

Indian American technology instructor

- Born: 3 July 1970; Telari
- Education: University of Arkansas at Little Rock
- Employer: Helen Keller National Center for Deaf-Blind Youths and Adults

Anindya Bapin Bhattacharyya (born 3 July 1970) is an Indian American technology instructor for the deafblind. He coordinates the National Outreach Technology Development and Training Program at the Helen Keller National Center for DeafBlind Youths and Adults, traveling the country teaching deafblind people to use adaptive technology. Deaf from birth and blind at the age of nine, Bhattacharyya has been an advocate for deafblind individuals in the United States and beyond.

== Early life and education ==
Anindya Bapin Bhattacharyya was born on 3 July 1970 in Telari, a small village in the state of West Bengal, in eastern India. He was born deaf and as a child wore a sound processor around his neck. Bhattacharyya grew up speaking Bengali and learned to lipread. His parents were middle class and well educated, but struggled to find appropriate educational opportunities for their son. Bhattacharyya attended a mainstream school as the only deaf student; his mother occasionally sat in on his elementary classes to help fill in gaps in teaching.

When Bhattacharyya was nine, another boy threw dirt in his face, which led to him developing detached retinas. Three months after that incident, his vision was completely gone. With no way to lip read, he lost access to a significant amount of communication and needed his parents to use tactile communication with him, such as printing letters on his palm. For four years he did not attend school, as his parents could not find anyone who had the capacity to teach someone with combined hearing and vision loss. During this time, Bhattacharyya developed a hobby of ceramics and sculpting.

His father, Ajay, wrote to Perkins School for the Blind, and with the financial help of a scholarship to the school, friends and relatives raised the money to send him to the United States. He moved to the U.S. at age thirteen, in 1983, accompanied by his father. At Perkins, he learned English and braille, and received physical therapy to improve his balance and physiological awareness. He attended Belmont Hill School part time while living at Perkins, graduating in 1992. In addition to his studies, Bhattacharyya was fascinated by the technology available in the U.S., attending computer shows across Massachusetts and buying computer parts to assemble his own desktop. He also began doing computer programming and set up his own bulletin board system, as well as building computers for other deafblind people, instructing them in how to use adaptive technology.

In September 1992, he entered Gardner-Webb University. Bhattacharyya graduated from the University of Arkansas at Little Rock in 1998 with a bachelor's degree in political science.

Shortly after moving to New York to start his career in 1999, he was featured in The New York Times for finishing the Seacrest-Tobay Triathlon.

== Work in adaptive technology ==
Bhattacharyya began working at the Helen Keller National Center for Deaf-Blind Youths and Adults in 1999. In his role as Coordinator of the National Outreach Technology Development and Training Program, he travels the U.S. helping deafblind people connect with adaptive technology. He also contributes to research and development of new technologies for disabled people. A 2006 CBS News article featured his contributions to developing a Braille modified laptop phone, a tactile talking tablet, and a screen Braille communicator. He also owns his own company, BapinGroup, which sells adaptive technology and computer hardware/software products.

As part of his work through the Helen Keller National Center, Bhattacharyya is involved in political advocacy for the needs of deafblind people. One result of his efforts was the 2012 establishment of the National Deaf-Blind Equipment Distribution Program (also known as "I Can Connect") through the Federal Communications Commission, which provides training, outreach, and assessment to low-income deafblind individuals. He also played a role in the passage of the Twenty-First Century Communications and Video Accessibility Act of 2010.

Bhattacharyya presents at conferences and writes frequently about his life and work, as when he wrote a 2005 New York Times article describing how he relies on his guide dog, technology, and assistance from others while traveling. He met his wife, Sook Hee Choi, when they both served on the board of the American Association for the DeafBlind.

He received the CavinKare Ability Special Recognition Award in 2020.
