= Liebreich =

Liebreich is a German surname. Notable people with the surname include:

- Karen Liebreich (born 1959), British historian, writer and gardener
- Michael Liebreich (born 1963), British businessman
- Oscar Liebreich (1839–1908), German pharmacologist
- Richard Liebreich (1830–1917), German ophthalmologist and physiologist
