= Helen Martin (disambiguation) =

Helen Martin (1909–2000) was an American actress.

Helen Martin may also refer to:

- Helen Reimensnyder Martin (1868–1939), American author
- Helen M. Martin (1889–1973), American geologist
- Helen May Martin, American pianist
- Helen Martin (politician)

== See also ==
- Helene Chung Martin, Australian journalist active 1968–present
