= SIAH2-AS1 =

Human gene encoding a long non-coding RNA

Identifiers
- Aliases: SIAH2-AS1, SIAH2 antisense RNA 1, CLRN1-AS1, CLRN1 antisense RNA 1
- External IDs: GeneCards: SIAH2-AS1
Orthologs
| Databases | NCBI: entry; OMA: entry |
| Species | Human | Mouse |
| Entrez | 100874005 | n/a |
| Ensembl | ENSG00000244265 | n/a |
| UniProt | n a | n/a |
| RefSeq (mRNA) | n/a | n/a |
| RefSeq (protein) | n/a | n/a |
| Location (UCSC) | n/a | n/a |
| PubMed search | | n/a |
- Wikidata
| View/Edit Human |

SIAH2 antisense RNA 1 is a non-coding RNA that in humans is encoded by the gene SIAH2-AS1. The related symbol, CLRN1-AS1, was originally identified in a screen to identify the genes responsible for Usher syndrome type 3 and presumed to be an unprocessed pseudogene.

== See also ==
- Long non-coding RNA
