= ADGRV1 =

Protein-coding gene in the species Homo sapiens

Identifiers
- Aliases: ADGRV1, FEB4, MASS1, USH2B, USH2C, VLGR1, VLGR1b, GPR98, adhesion G protein-coupled receptor V1
- External IDs: OMIM: 602851; MGI: 1274784; GeneCards: ADGRV1

Gene location (Human)
Chr.	Chromosome 5 (human)
Band	5q14.3	Start	90,529,344 bp
Band	5q14.3	End	91,164,437 bp

Gene location (Mouse)
Chr.	Chromosome 13 (mouse)
Band	13 C2- C3|13 42.18 cM	Start	81,243,187 bp
Band	13 C2- C3|13 42.18 cM	End	81,781,273 bp
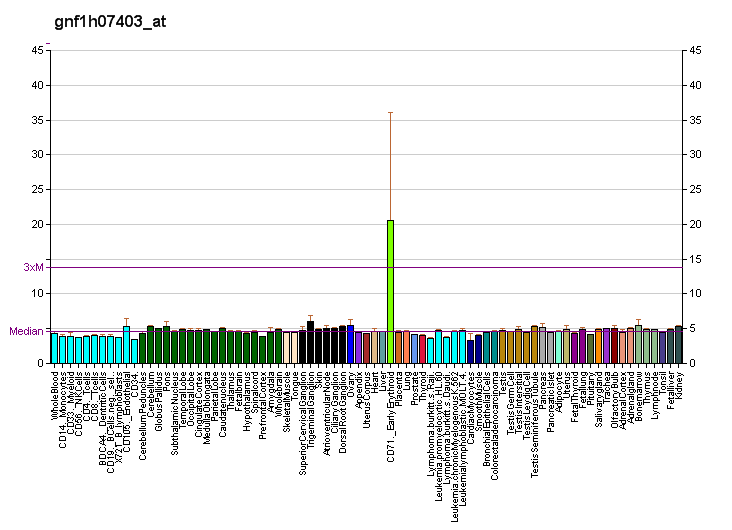

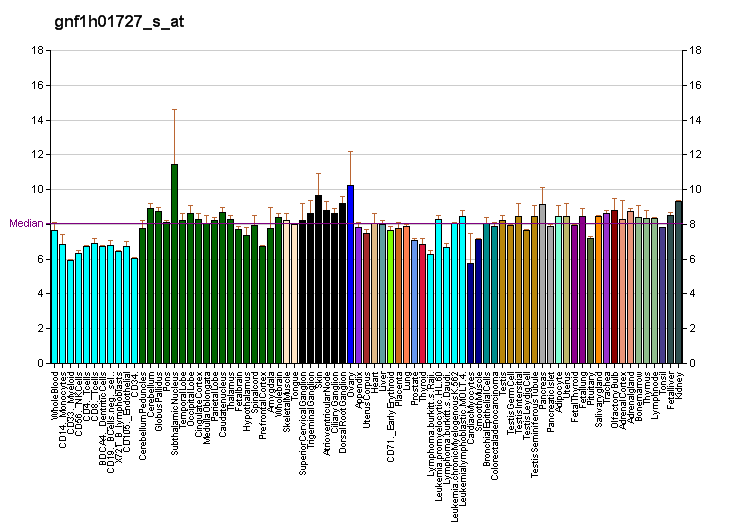

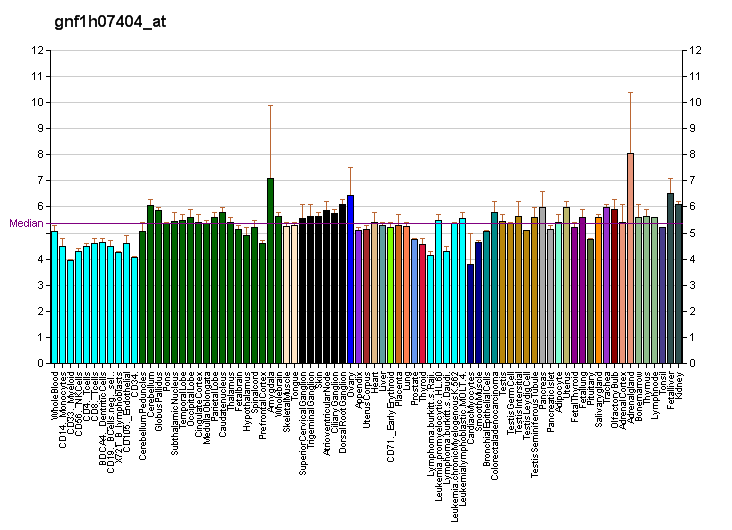
RNA expression pattern
Bgee	Human / Mouse (ortholog); Top expressed in: right adrenal cortex; left adrenal gland; ventricular zone; left adrenal cortex; ganglionic eminence; caudate nucleus; nucleus accumbens; putamen; amygdala; anterior pituitary / Top expressed in: neural layer of retina; ventricular zone; lens; spermatid; barrel cortex; cumulus cell; spermatocyte; optic nerve; embryo; saccule; More reference expression data
BioGPS	More reference expression data
Gene ontology
Molecular function	calcium ion binding; G protein-coupled receptor activity; signal transducer activity; protein binding; transmembrane signaling receptor activity; G-protein alpha-subunit binding; adenylate cyclase inhibitor activity; hydrolase activity
Cellular component	cytoplasm; integral component of membrane; membrane; receptor complex; plasma membrane; synapse; stereocilium; cell surface; extracellular exosome; photoreceptor inner segment; stereocilia ankle link; stereocilia ankle link complex; cell projection; stereocilium membrane; periciliary membrane compartment; USH2 complex
Biological process	G protein-coupled receptor signaling pathway; response to stimulus; nervous system process; sensory perception of light stimulus; hearing; nervous system development; cell communication; cell surface receptor signaling pathway; photoreceptor cell maintenance; maintenance of animal organ identity; signal transduction; visual perception; cell-cell adhesion; negative regulation of adenylate cyclase activity; positive regulation of protein kinase A signaling; positive regulation of bone mineralization; regulation of protein stability; establishment of protein localization; inner ear development; detection of mechanical stimulus involved in sensory perception of sound; inner ear receptor cell stereocilium organization; cellular response to calcium ion; positive regulation of protein kinase C signaling; self proteolysis
Sources:Amigo / QuickGO
Orthologs
Databases	NCBI: entry; OMA: entry
Species	Human	Mouse
Entrez	84059	110789
Ensembl	ENSG00000164199	ENSMUSG00000069170
UniProt	Q8WXG9	Q8VHN7
RefSeq (mRNA)	NM_032119	NM_054053
RefSeq (protein)	NP_115495	NP_473394
Location (UCSC)	Chr 5: 90.53 – 91.16 Mb	Chr 13: 81.24 – 81.78 Mb
PubMed search
- Wikidata
View/Edit Human	View/Edit Mouse

Adhesion G protein-coupled receptor V1 (ADGRV1), also known as Very Large G-protein coupled receptor 1 (VLGR1), is a protein that in humans is encoded by the ADGRV1 gene (previously GPR98). Several alternatively spliced transcripts have been described.

The adhesion GPCR VLGR1 is the largest GPCR known, with a size of 6300 amino acids and consisting of 90 exons. There are 8 splice variants of VlgR1, named VlgR1a-1e and Mass1.1-1.3. The N-terminus consists of 5800 amino acids containing 35 Calx-beta domains, one pentraxin domain, and one epilepsy associated repeat. Mutations of VlgR1 have been shown to result in Usher's syndrome. Knockouts of Vlgr1 in mice have been shown to phenocopy Usher's syndrome and lead to audiogenic seizures.

== Function ==
This gene encodes a member of the adhesion-GPCR family of receptors. The protein binds calcium and is expressed in the central nervous system. It is also known as very large G-protein coupled receptor 1 because it is 6300 residues long. It contains a C-terminal 7-transmembrane receptor domain, whereas the large N-terminal segment (5900 residues) includes 35 calcium binding Calx-beta domains, and 6 EAR domains.

== Evolution ==
The sea urchin genome has a homolog of VLGR1 in it.

== Clinical significance ==
Mutations in this gene are associated with Usher syndrome 2 and familial febrile seizures.
