= USH1C =

Identifiers
- Aliases: USH1C, AIE-75, DFNB18, DFNB18A, NY-CO-37, NY-CO-38, PDZ-45, PDZ-73, PDZ-73/NY-CO-38, PDZ73, PDZD7C, ush1cpst, USH1 protein network component harmonin
- External IDs: OMIM: 605242; MGI: 1919338; GeneCards: USH1C
Available structures
PDB	Ortholog search: PDBe RCSB
PDB	List of PDB id codes 3K1R, 2KBS, 2LSR, 2KBQ, 2KBR, 1X5N, 5F3X

Gene location (Human)
Chr.	Chromosome 11 (human)
Band	11p15.1	Start	17,493,895 bp
Band	11p15.1	End	17,544,416 bp

Gene location (Mouse)
Chr.	Chromosome 7 (mouse)
Band	7 B3|7 29.66 cM	Start	45,844,774 bp
Band	7 B3|7 29.66 cM	End	45,887,927 bp
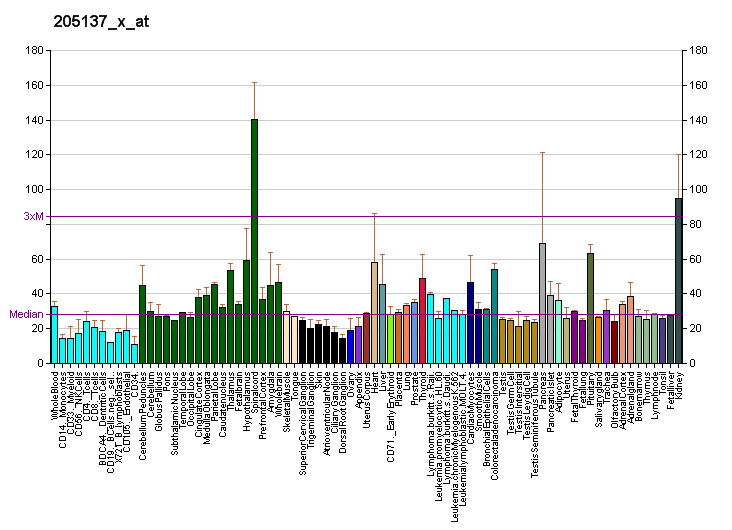

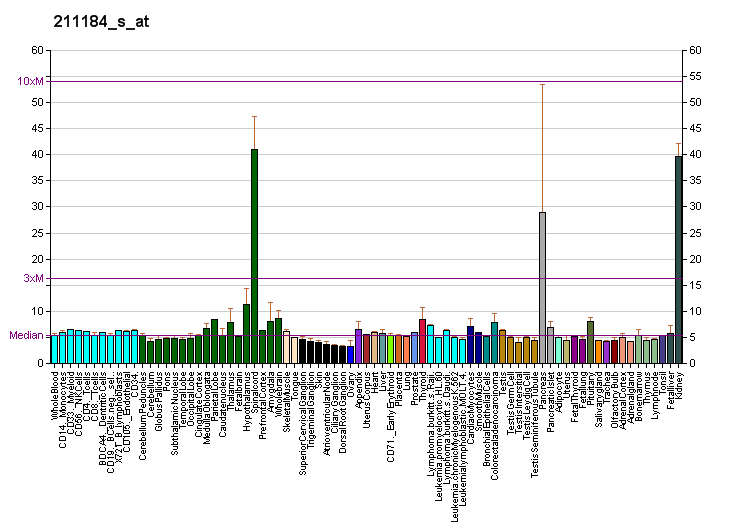
RNA expression pattern
Bgee	Human / Mouse (ortholog); Top expressed in: mucosa of transverse colon; C1 segment; rectum; mucosa of ileum; duodenum; optic nerve; gallbladder; human kidney; jejunal mucosa; pancreatic ductal cell / Top expressed in: utricle; intestinal villus; vestibular sensory epithelium; saccule; crypt of lieberkuhn of small intestine; duodenum; ileum; right kidney; jejunum; colon; More reference expression data
BioGPS	More reference expression data
Gene ontology
Molecular function	spectrin binding; actin filament binding; protein binding
Cellular component	cytoplasm; apical part of cell; brush border; cytoskeleton; cell projection; microvillus; cytosol; photoreceptor outer segment; photoreceptor inner segment; plasma membrane; stereocilium; synapse; stereocilia ankle link; stereocilia ankle link complex; photoreceptor connecting cilium; stereocilium tip
Biological process	sensory perception of light stimulus; hearing; G2/M transition of mitotic cell cycle; equilibrioception; photoreceptor cell maintenance; regulation of microvillus length; cell differentiation; parallel actin filament bundle assembly; inner ear morphogenesis; inner ear auditory receptor cell differentiation; actin filament bundle assembly; inner ear receptor cell stereocilium organization; protein localization to microvillus; brush border assembly; retinal cone cell development
Sources:Amigo / QuickGO
Orthologs
Databases	NCBI: entry; OMA: entry
Species	Human	Mouse
Entrez	10083	72088
Ensembl	ENSG00000006611	ENSMUSG00000030838
UniProt	Q9Y6N9	Q9ES64
RefSeq (mRNA)	NM_001297764; NM_005709; NM_153676	NM_001163733; NM_001291182; NM_023649; NM_153677
RefSeq (protein)	NP_001284693; NP_005700; NP_710142	NP_001157205; NP_001278111; NP_076138; NP_710143
Location (UCSC)	Chr 11: 17.49 – 17.54 Mb	Chr 7: 45.84 – 45.89 Mb
PubMed search
- Wikidata
View/Edit Human	View/Edit Mouse

Harmonin is a protein that in humans is encoded by the USH1C gene. It is expressed in sensory cells of the inner ear and retina, where it plays a role in hearing, balance, and vision. Mutations at the USH1C locus cause Usher syndrome type 1c and nonsyndromic sensorineural deafness.

== Gene and protein structure ==
The USH1C gene is located on chromosome 11 and contains 28 exons. Alternative splicing generates multiple mRNA transcript variants, some of which are associated with the rare disorder phenotypes of Usher syndrome and nonsyndromic sensorineural deafness. The encoded protein harmonin has multiple protein isoforms due to the alternative splicing, including a standard isoform with 552 amino acids. Harmonin contains a PDZ domain, which assists in attaching the protein to the cell membrane and to cytoskeletal components.

== Inner ear function ==
Harmonin is found at the apex of inner hair cells (IHCs), which convert mechanical signals from sound waves into electrical signals interpreted by the brain as sound. IHCs have an apical bundle of actin-rich stereocilia that vary in height and are connected to each other by flexible tip links. Tip links are protein complexes of cadherin 23 (CDH23) and protocadherin 15 (PCDH15). Harmonin binds to proteins that are involved in connecting the tip link to the cytoskeleton. Sound waves physically displace the bundle towards the tallest stereocilium, stretching the tip links and causing mechanically gated ion channels to open. Influx of calcium (Ca^{2+}) and potassium (K^{+}) depolarizes the hair cell, triggering the release of excitatory neurotransmitters onto the innervating nerve terminals. The process is called mechanoelectrical transduction and ultimately results in the perception of sound. Intact tip links and their associated proteins, including harmonin, are required for channel activation and normal hearing.

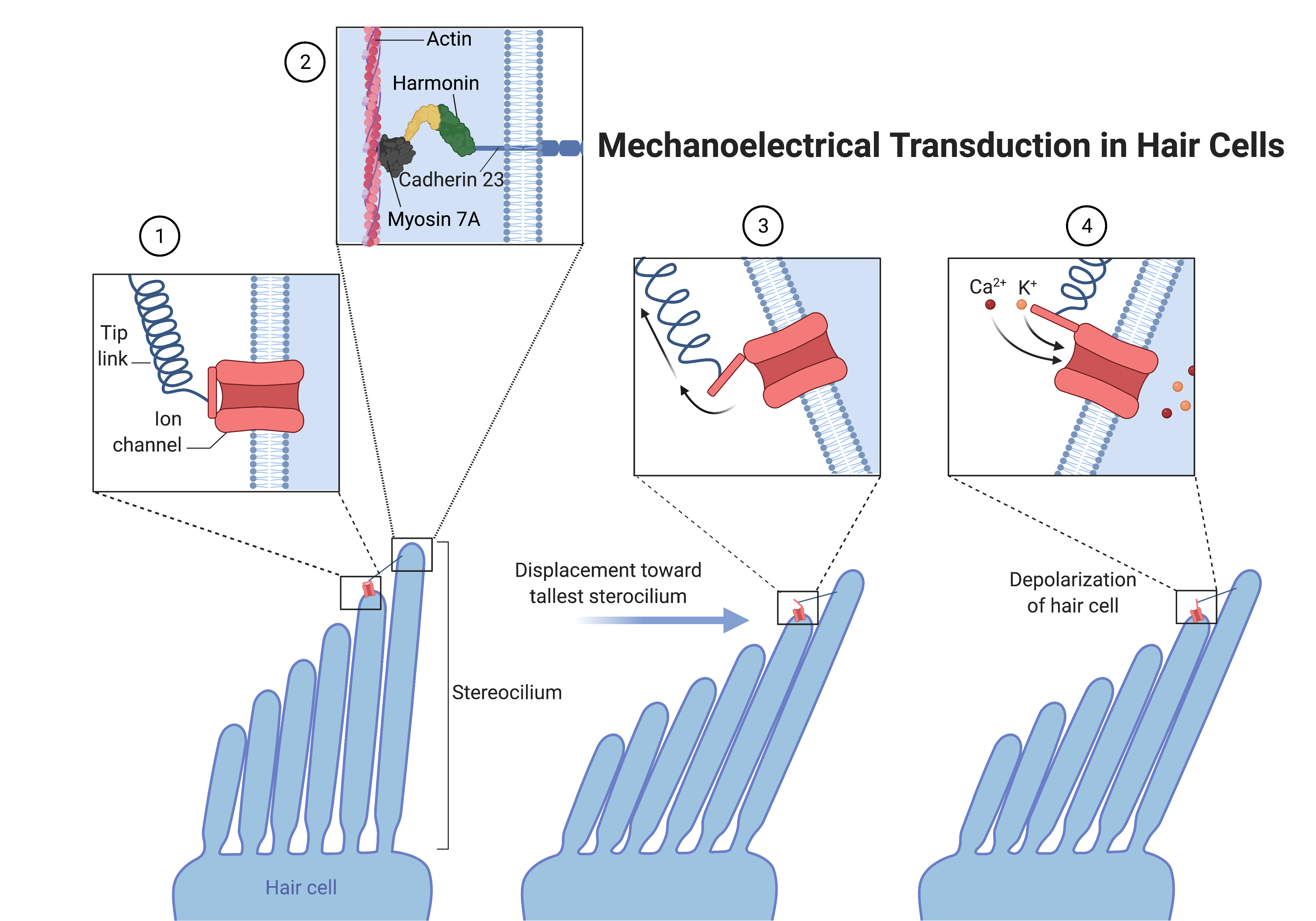
Mechanoelectrical transduction in hair cells. (1) Mechanically gated ion channel (orange) is attached to a tip link, which consists of homodimers of cadherin 23 and protocadherin 15. (2) Inside a stereocilium, harmonin (green) links the cytoplasmic terminus of cadherin 23 (blue) to myosin 7A (black), a motor protein that tightly binds filamentous actin of the cytoskeleton (pink). (3) The vibrational energy in sound waves physically displaces the bundle toward the tallest stereocilium, increasing tension in the tip link that forces the ion channel to open. (4) Influx of the cations calcium (Ca^{2+}; red) and potassium (K^{+}; yellow) depolarizes the hair cell to trigger neurotransmitter release.

== Mutations ==
USH1C mutations inherited in an autosomal recessive pattern have been identified as the genetic basis of both Usher syndrome type 1c and nonsyndromic sensorineural deafness type 18 (DFNB18). A diploid individual has two alleles, or copies, of the USH1C gene, one inherited from the maternal parent and one inherited from the paternal parent. A wild type USH1C allele encodes the functional harmonin protein, whereas a mutant USH1C allele cannot. Expression of the wild type USH1C allele is dominant over the mutant USH1C allele. An individual with two wild type alleles will be unaffected, an individual with one wild type allele and one mutant allele will be an asymptomatic carrier, and an individual with two mutant alleles will experience the disorder phenotype. The molecular personality of each USH1c mutation determines whether the resulting phenotype is nonsyndromic deafness or Usher syndrome.

A common mutation that causes Usher syndrome is a single nucleotide polymorphism (SNP) at nucleotide 216 that replaces the base guanine with the base adenine, creating a frameshift with a deletion of 35 base pairs. The 216 G to A mutation introduces a cryptic splice site that is used instead of the wild-type splice site during post-transcriptional RNA processing. The consequent mis-splicing causes the 35-nucleotide deletion in the mature mRNA transcript. Since the change in the RNA sequence is not a multiple of three, the mRNA contains a frameshift and a premature stop codon after 189 nucleotides. If the mRNA were translated, a 135-amino-acid protein would be formed instead of wild type harmonin, but there is no evidence that protein is made from the misspliced mRNA. An individual will experience Usher syndrome type 1c if they are homozygous for the 216 G to A mutant allele, which is found at high frequencies in Acadian populations.

== Usher syndrome ==
Usher syndrome is a rare autosomal recessive disorder caused by a mutation in one of several genes involved in hearing, balance, and vision. There are multiple types of Usher syndrome that vary in severity and symptomatology depending on the affected gene. Usher syndrome type 1c is caused by a mutation at the USH1C locus and is characterized by childhood onset of bilateral sensorineural hearing loss, vestibular dysfunction, and vision loss from retinitis pigmentosa. Usher syndrome type 1 is the most severe form of Usher syndrome. The prevalence of Usher syndrome is approximately 3-6 in 100,000 live births, rendering the disorder the most common cause of comorbid hearing and vision loss. Usher syndrome type 1c is prevalent in Acadian populations but is found worldwide. Although there is no cure, studies to evaluate potential gene therapies are ongoing.

== Gene therapy ==
Human hearing develops by 19 weeks gestation. At birth, individuals with Usher syndrome type 1c already have sensorineural hearing loss from mutant harmonin, and mammalian hearing loss is presently irreversible. It is hypothesized that gene therapy to correct the USH1C mutation and restore the wild type harmonin protein is most effective during the critical developmental window that is hypothesized to close one week before hearing onset. Studies of mouse models of Usher syndrome type 1c note that hearing develops in mice at postnatal day 12. Gene therapy to deliver an antisense oligonucleotide to the mouse inner ear rescued wild type harmonin mRNA splicing as well as hearing and vestibular function when delivered at embryonic day 12.5 or postnatal days 1-5 but was significantly less effective thereafter. The antisense oligonucleotide sequence is complementary to a segment of the 216 G to A mutant mRNA and mechanically blocks the cryptic splice site so that the wild type splice site is used. Likewise, gene therapy to deliver an adeno-associated viral (AAV) vector encoding wild type harmonin to the mouse inner ear rescued hearing and vestibular function when delivered on postnatal days 0-1 but was ineffective at postnatal days 10-12.

Gene therapy is controversial due to ethical and social considerations. For example, some members of the deaf community embrace hearing loss as a positive aspect of their identity and culture that they do not wish to change, whereas other members seek therapeutic interventions. However, there is widespread interest in developing gene therapies to provide treatment options for patients, especially when the symptoms of a genetic disorder are debilitating and difficult to manage with conventional strategies.
