= Charles Usher =

Scottish ophthalmologist (1865–1942)

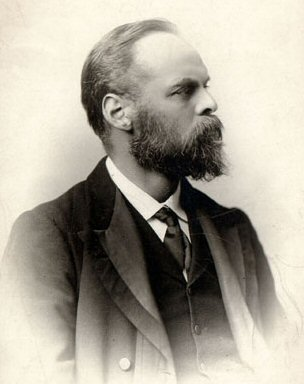
Usher ca. 1900

Charles Howard Usher (2 March 1865 – 3 March 1942) was a Scottish ophthalmologist from Edinburgh. He studied medicine at St. Thomas Hospital in London, and after receiving his doctorate in 1891, he remained at St. Thomas, working under Edward Nettleship (1845–1913). Later he was an eye surgeon at the Aberdeen Hospital for Sick Children, and also worked in the Aberdeen Royal Infirmary.

Usher is known for the eponymous Usher syndrome, which he described in a 1914 treatise titled On the inheritance of retinitis pigmentosa. He based his findings on a survey of 69 individuals who suffered from visual problems associated with deafness. Usher demonstrated that the disease was inherited, and that parents passed the condition onto their children. His discovery was a continuation of the work done by German ophthalmologists Albrecht von Graefe and Richard Liebreich, who did extensive research of retinitis pigmentosa and its link to deafness in the mid-19th century.

With Dr. Nettleship and Karl Pearson (1857–1936), Usher produced an important work on albinism called A Monograph on Albinism in Man.
