= Catherine Fischer =

American deafblind librarian and author

Catherine "Kitty" Hoffpauir Fischer (born c. 1947) is an American deafblind librarian and author. She is the co-author of Orchid of the Bayou: A Deaf Woman Faces Blindness a book about her life published in 2001.

== Biography ==
Fischer was born Catherine Hoffpauir in Rayne, Louisiana, with an Acadian-Cajun background. Her family was originally from France and emigrated to Nova Scotia and later to Louisiana. In doing the research for her book, Fischer found that her parents' families had "intermarried with each other for generations." She was born deaf and her parents originally attempted to cure her deafness via folk healers.

She attended Louisiana School for the Deaf, a residential school, as a child and later attended Gallaudet University in 1972 where she met her husband. She worked as a librarian at the Model Secondary School for the Deaf in Washington, D.C., from 1971 until her retirement in 1995. She became an advocate for people with Usher Syndrome, writing and presenting on instructional techniques for people with this disability. She was also an advocate for residential schools for deaf children believing they thrive in environments where they can interact with other deaf children.

Fischer had Usher Syndrome, but did not receive an official diagnosis until she was 27 years old. She was born unable to hear, but did not start to lose her vision until her son was born. She married Lance Fischer, a Jewish deaf archivist from Brooklyn, New York. Her diagnosis provided a conduit for reconnecting with her family of origin and her Cajun roots since Usher Syndrome is more prevalent in Cajun communities than non-Cajun ones. Her autobiography is a celebration of her four cultures: Deaf, Cajun, Blind, and Jewish, what Gallaudet Press calls "one woman's genuinely postmodern identity."
