= VEZT =

Protein-coding gene in the species Homo sapiens

Identifiers
- Aliases: VEZT, VEZATIN, vezatin, adherens junctions transmembrane protein
- External IDs: MGI: 2143698; HomoloGene: 9739; GeneCards: VEZT; OMA:VEZT - orthologs

Gene location (Mouse)
Chr.	Chromosome 10 (mouse)
Band	10|10 C2	Start	93,775,027 bp
Band	10|10 C2	End	93,871,679 bp
Gene ontology
Molecular function	myosin binding
Cellular component	integral component of membrane; adherens junction; cell junction; plasma membrane; acrosomal vesicle; membrane; cytoplasmic vesicle; nucleus; nucleoplasm; cytosol; stereocilia ankle link complex; cell projection; stereocilium membrane
Biological process	cell-cell adhesion
Sources:Amigo / QuickGO
Orthologs
Species	Human	Mouse
Entrez	55591	215008
Ensembl	ENSG00000028203	ENSMUSG00000036099
UniProt	Q9HBM0	Q3ZK22
RefSeq (mRNA)	NM_017599	NM_172538; NM_001304572; NM_001304575; NM_001304720
RefSeq (protein)	NP_060069; NP_001339017; NP_001339018; NP_001339019; NP_001339020 NP_001339021; NP_001339022; NP_001339023; NP_001339024; NP_001339025; NP_001339026; NP_001339027; NP_001339028; NP_001339029; NP_001339030; NP_001339031; NP_001339032; NP_001339033; NP_001339034; NP_001339035; NP_001339036; NP_001339037; NP_001339038; NP_001339039; NP_001339040; NP_001339041; NP_001339042; NP_001339043; NP_001339044; NP_001339045; NP_001339046; NP_001339047; NP_001339048	NP_001291501; NP_001291504; NP_001291649; NP_766126
Location (UCSC)	n/a	Chr 10: 93.78 – 93.87 Mb
PubMed search
- Wikidata
View/Edit Human	View/Edit Mouse

VEZT is a gene located on chromosome 12 and encodes for the protein vezatin. Vezatin is a major component of the cadherin-catenin complex that is critical to the formation and maintenance of adherens junctions. The protein is expressed in most epithelial cells and is crucial to the formation of cell-cell contact junctions. Mutations of the gene can lead to upregulation or downregulation of the protein which can have detrimental effects on physiological systems, particularly those involved in development.

== Function ==
=== Adherens junctions ===
The protein vezatin has been shown to play a critical role in the maintenance and formation of adherens junctions in many epithelial cells. Adherens junctions are composed primarily of E-cadherin, alpha and beta catenins and other proteins such as actin and myosin. The junctions formed are vital in creating cell-cell contacts and do so via the interactions of all the different components. E-cadherins on separate cells use calcium based interactions to bind, whilst the catenins bind the cadherins to the actin cytoskeleton of each cell, thus creating the cadherin-catenin complex. Vezatin co-localises with E-cadherin at these cell-cell junctions suggesting that in fact it is involved within adherens junctions. E-cadherin is an important transmembrane molecule in creating and facilitating adherens junctions, particularly in epithelial cells. Furthermore, vezatin does not appear at focal adhesion sites and does not co-localise with desmogleins, which are molecules present in desmosomes, suggesting it is solely responsible for interactions within the adherens junction. Additionally, in cells lacking E-cadherin and thus unable to form cell-cell contacts, vezatin displayed a cytoplasmic distribution. Another key component of this junction is the protein myosin VIIA and primarily its interaction with vezatin. Myosins are mechanochemical proteins which interact with actins and enzymatically convert ATP to ADP in order to facilitate a motor function. Myosin VIIA is an unconventional member of the myosin family and is heavily expressed within ciliated epithelium such as that in the nose and the ear. Myosin VIIA has a similar structure to all other myosins, with a motor, neck and actin-binding domain, but is unique due to its short tail domain. Vezatin has been shown to interact with this tail domain due to co-localisation of both molecules in mouse inner-ear epithelial cells. However, this interaction was only observed during cell-cell contact junctions, otherwise the proteins are dispersed through the cytoplasm in individual cells. These results taken together suggest that vezatin plays a crucial role in the cadherin-catenin complex which is essential for cell-cell adhesion.

=== Blastocyst morphogenesis ===
The morphogenesis of a blastocyst is dependent on the formation of the trophectoderm, the first epithelial layer. Like all other epithelium, the trophectoderm is composed of polarised cells with highly specialised adhesion complexes along the lateral sides of the cells. This layer of cells is vital in the implantation of the embryo to the uterus and gives rise to majority of the extra-embryonic tissues. In order for the proper physiological function of these cells and ultimately the proper development of the embryo, the adherens junctions between them must be properly developed. VEZT codes for the protein vezatin which is an essential protein in the regulation and maintenance of these adherens junctions. However, most genes and subsequent protein release are determined by the combination of paternal and maternal DNA mixing. In the case of the early embryo, especially before compaction has started to occur, majority of the control is via the maternal genome. Vezatin has been shown to appear in the mouse blastocyst as early as the 2-cell stage, suggesting that this protein is in fact under the maternal genome control. Two isoforms of the protein however are evidenced later on at the 8-cell stage, suggesting that now the gene is under the control of the embryo itself. Furthermore, expression of vezatin has been shown to be linked with that of E-cadherin. Disruption of vezatin synthesis in the early embryo not only leads to lack of adherens junction formation, but also results in a strong reduction of E-cadherin protein present. Vezatin itself could be involved in the regulation of the transcription of E-cadherin as it is seen within the nucleus of early embryonic cells. Whilst there are several transcription factors that are associated with the repression of E-cadherin, it is unknown which is the novel target that is engaged when vezatin is also inhibited.

=== Fertilisation ===
The process of spermatogenesis occurs in male mammals within the testis. This is the process of rounded spermatocytes developing into elongating spermatozoa with a flagellum. Spermatogenesis has two successive phases, one being spermiogenesis within the Sertoli cells of the testis and the other being maturation within the epididymis. The adherens junctions in the Sertoli cells is one of the only epithelial cell-cell junction that lacks the expression of vezatin. Furthermore, the basal Sertoli-Sertoli cell junctions and the apical Sertoli-germ cell junctions contain myosin VIIA but lack its counterpart vezatin. Myosin VIIA is almost always expressed with vezatin but the absence of this partnership within the testis is yet to be fully understood. However, vezatin has been shown to be expressed within the acrosomal region of the actual spermatozoa. Vezatin is not found in the early spermatid but only appears when the formation of the acrosome occurs later on in the process of spermatogenesis. The acrosome itself is divided into two functional domains, the inner acrosomal membrane which faces the nucleus and the outer acrosomal membrane which is in contact with the exterior surfaces of the sperm. This compartmentalisation of functions is vital to the fusion of the sperm with the egg as, it is the outer acrosomal domain which initiates the acrosome reaction, enabling the sperm to fuse. Vezatin is present in both these domains, but the translocation of vezatin from the inner to the outer membrane is unknown. Furthermore, vezatin is not expressed in the epididymal cells, thus vezatin cannot be added to the exterior membrane during maturation of the spermatozoa. However, knowledge of the localisation of vezatin in this outer membrane and its known role in adherens junctions suggests that it plays a role in the fusion of the mammalian gametes during fertilisation.

== Clinical significance ==
=== Endometriosis ===
Endometriosis is a gynaecological disorder affecting 1 in 10 women in their reproductive years globally. This disorder occurs when endometrial tissue which grows inside the lining of the uterus grows on the outer surface of the uterus. The predominant symptoms of this are pelvic pain and infertility, however 25% of women who are inflicted with the disease may show none of these symptoms. Whilst the disease is usually non-fatal, it can have prolonged social and psychological effects on women and thus degrades their quality of life. Whilst the causes of the disease are still unclear, a certain number of genes have been linked to being a contributing factor for the disease. Of these, mutations in the VEZT gene have been identified by various Genome-wide association studies (GWAS). The VEZT gene is a complex gene, however it is known that the single nucleotide polymorphism (SNP) rs10859871 at locus 12q22 has been highly linked to being a genetic cause of endometriosis in women. An SNP is simply a variation that occurs in a single nucleotide in a specific region of a gene. Vezatin, the protein encoded by the VEZT gene is seen abundantly in endometrial and myometrial tissue, with localisation of the protein being both cytoplasmic and nuclear. This result was concurrent with previous literature stating the prominent role of vezatin in the regulation and maintenance of adherens junctions. This specific SNP is proven to cause an increase in vezatin expression within the endometrial cells, thus posing as a risk factor in the pathogenesis of endometriosis. Vezatin expression is also greater in ectopic endometrium as opposed to eutopic. Furthermore, vezatin expression is significantly increased in glandular endometrium during the secretory phase of the menstrual cycle. This result in conjunction with the finding that other adherens junction components also increase expression suggests that this process may be occurring in response to fluctuating progesterone levels. However, the mechanism of increased vezatin expression leading to the formation of ectopic endometrial tissues is unknown. Furthermore, there is much more scientific study required to directly link mutations in the VEZT gene to a direct cause of endometriosis.
