= USH1G =

Protein-coding gene in the species Homo sapiens

Identifiers
- Aliases: USH1G, ANKS4A, SANS, USH1 protein network component sans
- External IDs: OMIM: 607696; MGI: 2450757; GeneCards: USH1G
Available structures
PDB	Ortholog search: PDBe RCSB
PDB	List of PDB id codes 2L7T, 3K1R, 3PVL

Gene location (Human)
Chr.	Chromosome 17 (human)
Band	17q25.1	Start	74,916,083 bp
Band	17q25.1	End	74,923,256 bp

Gene location (Mouse)
Chr.	Chromosome 11 (mouse)
Band	11 E2|11 80.84 cM	Start	115,206,018 bp
Band	11 E2|11 80.84 cM	End	115,212,867 bp
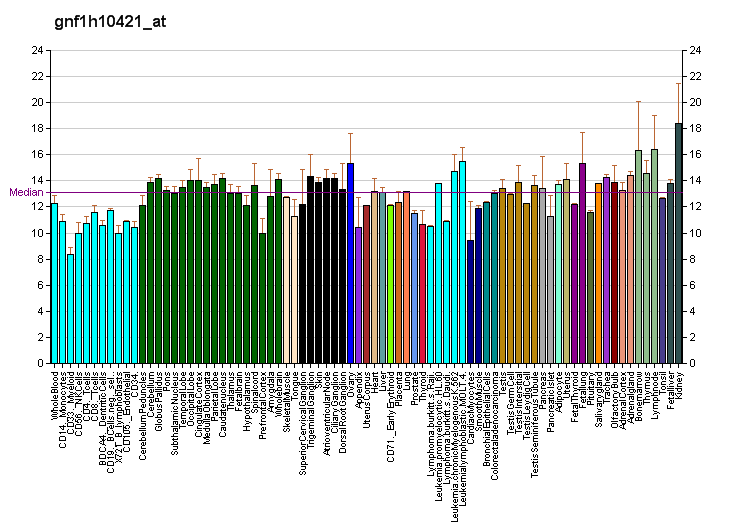
RNA expression pattern
Bgee	Human / Mouse (ortholog); Top expressed in: testicle; skin of leg; right adrenal cortex; left adrenal cortex; skin of abdomen; granulocyte; smooth muscle tissue; body of uterus; left testis; right testis / Top expressed in: olfactory bulb; epithelium of macula of saccule of membranous labyrinth; embryo; organ of Corti; cochlea; cerebellar cortex; ovary; lip; muscle of thigh; Cortex of frontal lobe; More reference expression data
BioGPS	More reference expression data
Gene ontology
Molecular function	spectrin binding; protein binding; protein homodimerization activity; identical protein binding
Cellular component	photoreceptor inner segment; cytoplasm; ciliary basal body; cytosol; plasma membrane; cytoskeleton; membrane; photoreceptor connecting cilium; actin cytoskeleton
Biological process	inner ear receptor cell differentiation; photoreceptor cell maintenance; hearing; inner ear morphogenesis; inner ear receptor cell stereocilium organization; sensory perception of light stimulus; equilibrioception
Sources:Amigo / QuickGO
Orthologs
Databases	NCBI: entry; OMA: entry
Species	Human	Mouse
Entrez	124590	16470
Ensembl	ENSG00000182040	ENSMUSG00000045288
UniProt	Q495M9	Q80T11
RefSeq (mRNA)	NM_001282489; NM_173477	NM_176847
RefSeq (protein)	NP_001269418; NP_775748	NP_789817
Location (UCSC)	Chr 17: 74.92 – 74.92 Mb	Chr 11: 115.21 – 115.21 Mb
PubMed search
- Wikidata
View/Edit Human	View/Edit Mouse

Usher syndrome type-1G protein is a protein that in humans is encoded by the USH1G gene.

This gene encodes a protein that contains three ankyrin repeat domains, a class I PDZ-binding motif and a sterile alpha motif. The encoded protein interacts with harmonin, which is associated with Usher syndrome type 1C.

This protein plays a role in the development and maintenance of the auditory and visual systems and functions in the cohesion of hair bundles formed by inner ear sensory cells. Mutations in this gene are associated with Usher syndrome type 1G (USH1G).
