= CDH23 =

Protein-coding gene in humans

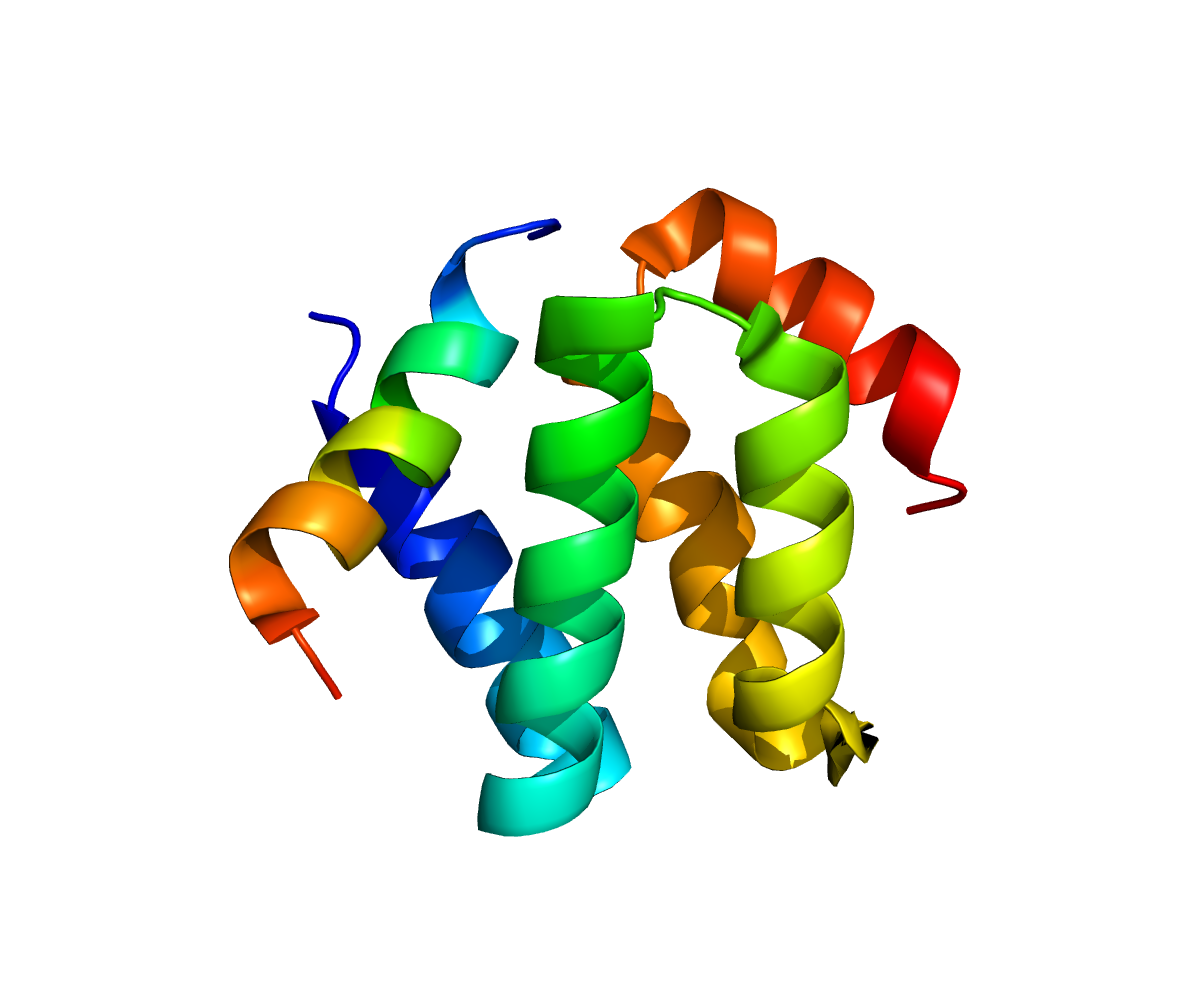

Identifiers
- Aliases: CDH23, CDHR23, USH1D, cadherin-related 23, cadherin related 23, PITA5
- External IDs: OMIM: 605516; MGI: 1890219; GeneCards: CDH23
Available structures
PDB	Ortholog search: PDBe RCSB
PDB	List of PDB id codes 2KBR, 2KBS, 2LSR

Gene location (Human)
Chr.	Chromosome 10 (human)
Band	10q22.1	Start	71,396,920 bp
Band	10q22.1	End	71,815,947 bp

Gene location (Mouse)
Chr.	Chromosome 10 (mouse)
Band	10 B4|10 30.11 cM	Start	60,138,527 bp
Band	10 B4|10 30.11 cM	End	60,532,269 bp
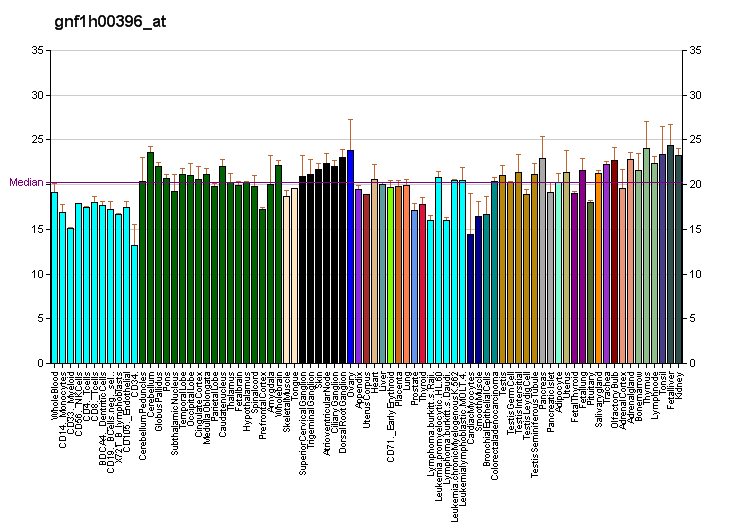

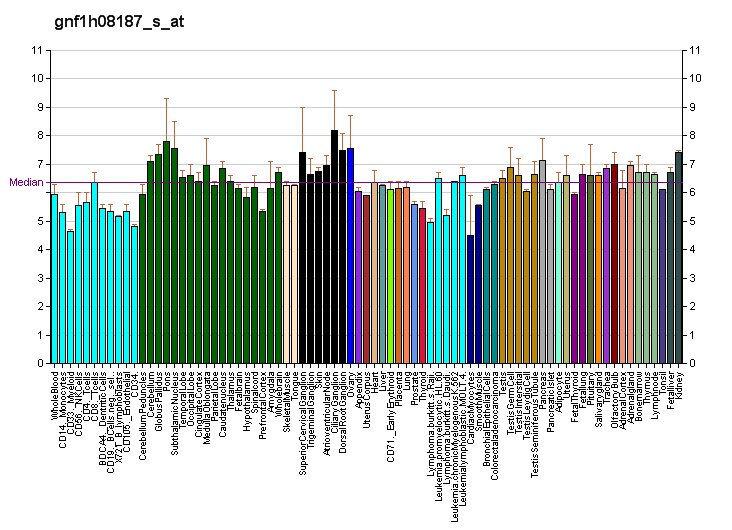

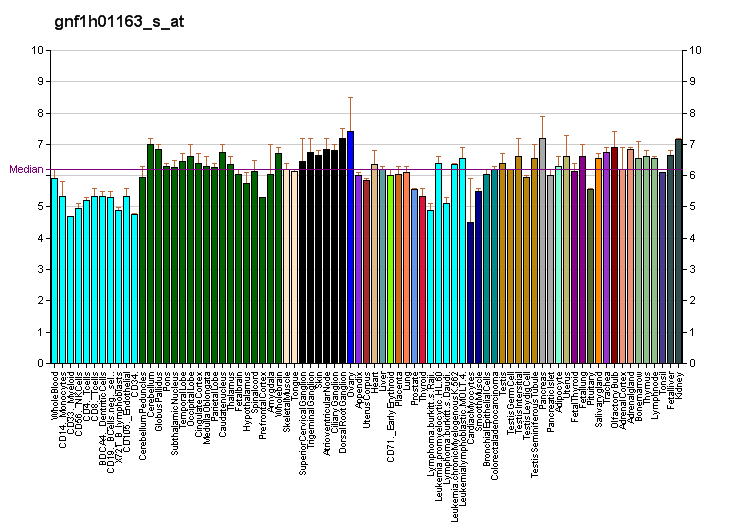
RNA expression pattern
Bgee	Human / Mouse (ortholog); Top expressed in: ventricular zone; left ovary; right ovary; right hemisphere of cerebellum; granulocyte; right lobe of liver; monocyte; sural nerve; apex of heart; left uterine tube / Top expressed in: spermatid; granulocyte; gastrula; lumbar subsegment of spinal cord; lumbar spinal ganglion; zygote; seminiferous tubule; spermatocyte; submandibular gland; morula; More reference expression data
BioGPS	More reference expression data
Gene ontology
Molecular function	metal ion binding; calcium ion binding; protein binding
Cellular component	plasma membrane; membrane; stereocilium; integral component of membrane
Biological process	equilibrioception; calcium ion transport; homophilic cell adhesion via plasma membrane adhesion molecules; photoreceptor cell maintenance; inner ear receptor cell stereocilium organization; locomotory behavior; visual perception; sensory perception of light stimulus; calcium-dependent cell-cell adhesion via plasma membrane cell adhesion molecules; response to stimulus; regulation of cytosolic calcium ion concentration; cell adhesion; hearing
Sources:Amigo / QuickGO
Orthologs
Databases	NCBI: entry; OMA: entry
Species	Human	Mouse
Entrez	64072	22295
Ensembl	ENSG00000107736	ENSMUSG00000012819
UniProt	Q9H251; Q6P152	Q99PF4
RefSeq (mRNA)	NM_001171930; NM_001171931; NM_001171932; NM_001171933; NM_001171934 NM_001171935; NM_001171936; NM_022124; NM_052836	NM_001252635; NM_023370
RefSeq (protein)	NP_001165401; NP_001165402; NP_001165403; NP_001165404; NP_001165405 NP_001165406; NP_001165407; NP_071407; NP_443068; NP_001165401.1; NP_071407.4	NP_001239564; NP_075859
Location (UCSC)	Chr 10: 71.4 – 71.82 Mb	Chr 10: 60.14 – 60.53 Mb
PubMed search
- Wikidata
View/Edit Human	View/Edit Mouse

Cadherin-23 is a protein that in humans is encoded by the CDH23 gene.

== Function ==
This gene is a member of the cadherin superfamily, genes encoding calcium dependent cell-cell adhesion glycoproteins. The protein encoded by this gene is a large, single-pass transmembrane protein composed of an extracellular domain containing 27 repeats that show significant homology to the cadherin ectodomain. Expressed in the neurosensory epithelium, the protein is thought to be involved in stereocilia organization and hair bundle formation. Specifically, it is thought to interact with protocadherin 15 to form tip-link filaments.

== Clinical significance ==
The gene is located in a region containing the human deafness loci DFNB12 and USH1D. Usher syndrome 1D and nonsyndromic autosomal recessive deafness DFNB12 are caused by allelic mutations of this novel cadherin-like gene. The gene is associated with kidney function decline.

== Interactions ==
CDH23 has been shown to interact with USH1C.
