= Haben: The Deafblind Woman Who Conquered Harvard Law =

Memoir by Haben Girma

- First edition
- Author: Haben Girma
- Language: English
- Genre: Memoir
- Published: August 6, 2019 (Hachette Book Group)
- Publication place: United States
- Media type: Print
- Pages: 288
- ISBN: 978-1-5387-2872-7

Haben: The Deafblind Woman Who Conquered Harvard Law is a memoir by Haben Girma, disability rights advocate and first deafblind graduate of Harvard Law School.

== Synopsis ==
Haben covers the time from Girma's childhood in Oakland, California, to her early professional life as a disability rights lawyer. Her deafblindness is progressive and so she had some sight and hearing as a child.

She attended mainstream public schools and camps for blind youth, spending summers with her mother's family in Eritrea. She had to deal with a lack of understanding from her teachers. Her parents were worried about her ability to take care of herself while on a school trip to Mali and later when attending Lewis & Clark College far from home.

She struggled in finding employment during and after her time in college, and hoped that a law degree would help.

At Harvard Law School, she needed accommodations in the classroom. At the time, her ASL skills were limited but she was no longer able to rely on her residual hearing. She was the one who came up with the idea of carrying a wireless keyboard that would allow another person to type information that would be transmitted to her computer, equipped with a refreshable braille display.

After graduation, she went to work as a disability rights lawyer and won a case that expanded the coverage of the Americans with Disabilities Act.

== Reception ==
Haben received positive reviews from Kirkus Reviews, Publishers Weekly, and BookPage. It was selected as a "New & Noteworthy" book by The New York Times.

O referred to Girma as "a millennial Helen Keller" in recommending her book to readers. Some media attention focused on Girma's wish to not be called "inspiring" in spite of her challenges and accomplishments, because she feels that it can be a cover for people's pity for her and their own gratitude that they do not share her disabilities.
