= Cochleosaccular degeneration with progressive cataracts =

- Specialty: Medical genetics, Audiology
- Usual onset: Adulthood
- Frequency: rare
- Deaths: 1, which may or may not have been related to the disorder itself.

Cochleosaccular degeneration with progressive cataracts, also known as autosomal dominant progressive sensorineural hearing loss and cataracts is a rare genetic disorder characterized by the adult-onset combination of cochleosaccular degeneration and progressive cataract which is transmitted as an autosomal dominant trait for generations in entire families, essentially resulting in familial deafblindness. Additional features include unstable gait. Only 15 cases from 2 multi-generational families in the United States and Italy (respectively) have been described in medical literature.

== Cases ==
- 1982: J B Nadol Jr. et al. describes 7 members from 5 sibships belonging to a four-generation American family. The proband was a 65-year-old man who had died as a result of a motorcycle accident. He had a cataract already present in his right eye since birth (a clinical finding known as congenital cataract, but he developed cataracts in his previously healthy left eye as well, he went through cataract extraction surgery when he was 42-years-old. He started showing signs of rapid progressive hearing loss at the age of 26, at the same time, he also developed a staggering gait, which falsely suggested he was under the influence of alcohol. His family had 6 other members who showed the same symptoms as him, 3 instances of male-to-male transmission (suggesting autosomal dominant inheritance), and 9 other members who were said to have progressive hearing loss only.
- 1992: A Guala et al. describes 8 members of a four-generation Italian family who showed the same symptoms as the members of the family described by Nadol et al.
