= Feeling Through =

2019 film by Doug Roland

- Promotional poster
- Directed by: Doug Roland
- Screenplay by: Doug Roland
- Produced by: Doug Roland; Luis Augusto Figueroa; Phil Newsom; Sue Ruzenski
- Starring: Steven Prescod; Robert Tarango
- Cinematography: Eugene Koh
- Edited by: Doug Roland
- Music by: Daniel Ryan
- Production companies: Doug Roland Films; Giant Hunter Media
- Release date: December 3, 2019
- Running time: 19 minutes
- Country: United States
- Language: English
- Budget: $3,200
- Box office: $443,050 (all short films)

Feeling Through is a 2019 American short drama film directed by Doug Roland. It was nominated for the 2021 Academy Award for Best Live Action Short Film. Actress Marlee Matlin serves as an executive producer.

== Plot ==
In New York City, a homeless teenager named Tereek is enjoying a late night with his friends. As they go their separate ways, Tereek notices a deaf and blind man named Artie holding a cane and a sign requesting assistance in crossing the street. Tereek hesitantly touches Artie to offer his help, and Artie writes the number of the bus he needs to catch. Tereek guides him to the bus stop and they gradually introduce themselves to one another. Although Tereek receives messages from his girlfriend, who is expecting him, he decides to stay with Artie and make sure he gets on the bus.

Artie tells Tereek that he is thirsty, so they head to a bodega where Tereek uses Artie's money to buy him a drink and himself a candy bar, pocketing $10 in the process. They return to the bus stop but just miss the bus. As they wait, Artie tells Tereek that he was on a date and that he needs to be tapped by the bus driver when he reaches his stop. The bus finally comes and they get on. Tereek tells the driver what Artie needs and the man brusquely agrees to help him. Artie and Tereek assure each other that they will be OK and embrace. When Tereek gets off the bus, he puts the $10 that he took from Artie's wallet into the cup of a sleeping homeless man.

== Production ==
The short film grew from director Doug Roland's encounter with a deafblind man in New York City years earlier. The title of Feeling Through is a pun: It is a reference to the deafblind community, which is at the heart of the film, as members of that community navigate the world through touch, while the metaphorical meaning refers to the protagonist's personal journey of having to carefully learn how to open his heart without necessarily knowing how to.

Realizing in that one interaction he went from seeing Artemio as his disability to seeing him as a friend inspired Roland to write the story for what eventually became Feeling Through.

"I thought to myself that I had never met anyone who was deafblind before, let alone really thought about that community. I tapped him and he took out a notepad and wrote a bus stop that he needed. I took him there, and when we arrived I saw that a bus wasn’t coming for over an hour. I wanted to let him know I’d sit and wait with him, but I didn’t know how to communicate with him. Then, instinctively, I took his palm and started tracing one letter at a time on it, and he understood. We sat together and had a whole conversation that way, and I got to know this man, Artemio, as a funny, charismatic, warm-hearted guy with who I felt like I had made a connection. When his bus arrived, we gave each other a big hug goodbye."

— Roland on the inspiration of Feeling Through

Roland partnered with the Helen Keller National Center in order to make the film and cast a deafblind actor in a lead role, which is a first in film history.

Roland also shot a behind-the-scenes documentary along the way, called Connecting the Dots, which follows the process of casting and working with the deafblind actor Robert Tarango, who also works at the kitchen of the Helen Keller Center, as well as their year-long search to find the real life Artemio.

== Cast ==
- Steven Prescod as Tereek
- Robert Tarango as Artie
- Francisco Burgos as Clay
- Alestair Shu as J.R.
- Javier Rodriguez as Bodega cashier
- Coffey as Homeless man
- Jose Toro as Sleeping man
- Luis Antonio Aponte as Bus driver

== Promotion ==
In addition to the film's festival run, Roland worked with Helen Keller National Center to create a fully accessible screening event called "The Feeling Through Experience", which included the making-of documentary called Connecting the Dots and a panel discussion and Q&A with the DeafBlind community.

== Accolades ==
Year	Award	Category	Recipient	Result	Ref.
2020	Bengaluru International Film Festival	Festival Award	Doug Roland	Runner Up	
2020	deadCenter Film Festival	Audience Award Best Short	Doug Roland	Won	
2020	Port Townsend Film Festival	Jury Award - Best Short Narrative	Doug Roland	Won	
2020	Port Townsend Film Festival	Audience Award - Best Short Narrative	Doug Roland	Won	
2020	Port Townsend Film Festival	Best Actor	Robert Tarango & Steven Prescod	Won	
2020	Portland Film Festival	Audience Award - Best Short	Doug Roland	Won	
2020	San Diego International Film Festival	Audience Award - Best Short	Doug Roland	Won	
2020	Wisconsin Film Festival	Honorable Mention - Golden Badger	Doug Roland	Won	
2020	Woods Hole Film Festival	Jury Award - Best Short Drama	Doug Roland	Won	
2021	Slamdance Film Festival	Unstoppable Shorts	Doug Roland	Honorable mention	
2021	93rd Academy Awards	Best Live-Action Short Film	Doug Roland, Sue Ruzenski	Nominated	
