= Marie's Story =

- Film poster
- Directed by: Jean-Pierre Améris
- Written by: Jean-Pierre Améris; Philippe Blasband
- Produced by: Denis Carot; Sophie Révil
- Starring: Isabelle Carré; Ariana Rivoire
- Cinematography: Virginie Saint-Martin
- Edited by: Anne Souriau
- Music by: Sonia Wieder-Atherton
- Production companies: Escazal Films; France 3 Cinéma; Rhône-Alpes Cinéma
- Distributed by: Diaphana Films
- Release dates: 10 August 2014 (Locarno); 12 November 2014 (France)
- Running time: 95 minutes
- Country: France
- Languages: French; French Sign Language
- Budget: €2.49 million

Marie's Story (French: Marie Heurtin) is a 2014 French biographical film directed by Jean-Pierre Améris and written by Améris and Philippe Blasband. It is based on the true story of Marie Heurtin (1885–1921), a girl who was born deafblind in late 19th century France. The film won the Variety Piazza Grande Award at the 67th Locarno International Film Festival.

== Story ==
In 1885, Marie Heurtin, the daughter of a humble artisan and his wife, is born deaf and blind and unable to communicate with the world around her. Desperate to find a connection with Marie and avoid sending her to an asylum, the Heurtins send her to the Larnay Institute in central France, where an order of Catholic nuns manage a school for deaf girls. There, the idealistic Sister Marguerite sees in Marie a unique potential and, despite her Mother Superior's skepticism, vows to bring the wild girl out of the darkness into which she was born.

=== Background ===
Marie's Story is based on the true story of Marie Heurtin, who continued her education at the institute and lived there until her death at the age of 36.

== Cast ==
- Ariana Rivoire as Marie Heurtin
- Isabelle Carré as Sister Marguerite
- Brigitte Catillon as Mother Superior
- Noémie Churlet as Sister Raphaëlle
- Gilles Treton as Monsieur Heurtin
- Laure Duthilleul as Madame Heurtin
- Martine Gautier as Sister Véronique
- Patricia Legrand as Sister Joseph
- Sonia Laroze as Sister Elisabeth
- Valérie Leroux as Sister Blandine
- Fany Buy as Sister Marthe
- Noémie Bianco as Sister Anne
- Eline De Lorenzi as Sister Clothilde
- Tiphaine Rabaud Fournier as Sister Marie-Ange

== Production ==
Shooting for the filming took place in Ain – including Montluel and Hauteville-Lompnes – as well as in Isère.

== See also ==
- List of films featuring the deaf and hard of hearing
