= Haben Girma =

Eritrean-American disability rights advocate

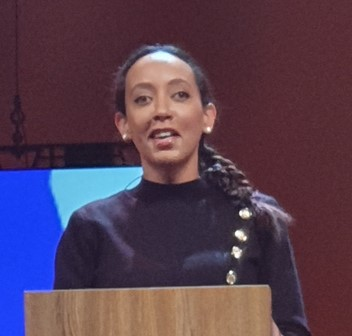
- Girma in December 2019.
- Born: July 29, 1988 (age 38); Oakland, California, U.S.
- Education: Lewis & Clark College (BA); Harvard University (JD)
- Occupations: Lawyer; Disability rights advocate
- Website: Official website

Haben Girma (born July 29, 1988) is an American disability rights advocate, who was the first deafblind graduate of Harvard Law School.

== Early life and education ==
Girma was born in Oakland, California in 1988 to an Eritrean immigrant family. Her father Girma Kidane Adgoy was born and raised in Addis Ababa, Ethiopia and her mother Saba Gebreyesus was born in Asmara. Her mother fled the Province of Eritrea to Sudan among many other Ethiopian refugees in 1983 during the Eritrean War of Independence and Ethiopian Civil War. Her mother met her father in California. Haben's parents are fluent in three languages; Tigrinya, Amharic, and English.

Girma lost her vision and hearing as a result of an unknown progressive condition beginning in early childhood. In a news article Girma states, "I was frequently left out of the spotlight, unable to fully engage in a world that seemed to forget I existed." She retains 1% of her sight.

Growing up in the United States, Girma benefited from civil rights laws including the Americans with Disabilities Act. She also had accessible technology, such as a digital Braille device—something her elder brother Mussie Gebre, who is also deafblind, did not have access to in Eritrea. She graduated from Skyline High School, a mainstream public school, in 2006.

At the age of 15, Girma traveled to Mali to do volunteer work, building schools with buildOn.

Girma attended Lewis & Clark College, where she successfully advocated for her legal rights to accommodations in the school cafeteria. She graduated from Lewis & Clark magna cum laude in 2010. She then became the first deafblind student to attend and graduate from Harvard Law School, earning her J.D. in 2013. She states, "Many schools didn't know how to teach me, and I was often told I would not succeed."

== Career ==
In 2013, Girma joined Disability Rights Advocates (DRA) in Berkeley, California as a Skadden Fellow. She worked there from 2015 to 2016 as a staff attorney, working on behalf of people with disabilities.

Girma says she became a lawyer in part to help increase access to books and other digital information for persons with disabilities. She now works to change attitudes about disability around the world, including the development of accessible digital services: "Digital information is just ones and zeroes...It can be converted into any kind of format. And those people who develop these services—programmers, technology designers—they have an incredible power to increase access for people with disabilities. And I hope they use it."

While working for DRA in July 2014, Haben represented the National Federation of the Blind and a blind Vermont resident in a lawsuit against Scribd for allegedly failing to provide access to blind readers, in violation of the Americans with Disabilities Act. Scribd moved to dismiss, arguing that the Americans with Disabilities Act (ADA) only applied to physical locations. In March 2015, the U.S. District Court of Vermont ruled that the ADA covered online businesses as well. A settlement agreement was reached, with Scribd agreeing to provide content accessible to blind readers by the end of 2017. "I found my voice when I was given the tools to learn," Girma emphasizes.

In 2014, Girma gave a talk at TEDxBaltimore. She confronted TED for not readily providing captions for all of their recorded TEDx talks, including her own.

In January 2015, Girma was appointed to the national board of trustees for the Helen Keller Services for the Blind.

On July 20, 2015, Girma met with US President Barack Obama at the White House to highlight the importance of accessible technology. She provided introductory remarks on the occasion, the 25th anniversary of the Americans with Disabilities Act.

In April 2016, Girma left DRA to take up non-litigation advocacy full-time.

In June 2016, Girma gave a talk on accessible design at the Apple Worldwide Developers Conference.

In 2018, The Washington Post published an op-ed by Girma directed at the Texas State Board of Education, which had voted to remove Helen Keller from the social studies curriculum. The board ultimately reversed its decision.

In August 2019, she released a memoir, Haben: The Deafblind Woman Who Conquered Harvard Law.

In April 2026, Girma was appointed Knight of the Order of Arts and Letters by the French Ministry of Culture for her global advocacy and contributions to disability rights and literature.

== Personal life ==
Girma enjoys participating in physical activities including surfing, rock climbing, kayaking, cycling, and dancing.

Girma uses the assistance of a guide dog. She was matched with her first dog, a German Shepherd named Maxine, by The Seeing Eye in 2009. After Maxine's death in 2018, she adopted Mylo, another German Shepherd.

== Awards and recognition ==
- 2013 – Champion of Change, Obama administration
- 2016 – Forbes 30 Under 30 in Law & Policy
- 2016 – Top 30 Thinkers Under 30, Pacific Standard
- 2017 – Top 100 most influential Africans, New African
- 2020 – Featured in Time100 Talks
- 2023 - Inaugural Commissioner, WHO Commission on Social Connection
- 2026 - Appointed as a Knight of the Order of Arts and Letters by the French Ministry of Culture
