= USH2A =

Protein-coding gene in humans

Identifiers
- Aliases: USH2A, RP39, US2, USH2, dJ1111A8.1, Usher syndrome 2A (autosomal recessive, mild), usherin
- External IDs: OMIM: 608400; MGI: 1341292; GeneCards: USH2A

Gene location (Human)
Chr.	Chromosome 1 (human)
Band	1q41	Start	215,622,891 bp
Band	1q41	End	216,423,448 bp

Gene location (Mouse)
Chr.	Chromosome 1 (mouse)
Band	1 H6|1 92.29 cM	Start	187,994,220 bp
Band	1 H6|1 92.29 cM	End	188,697,238 bp
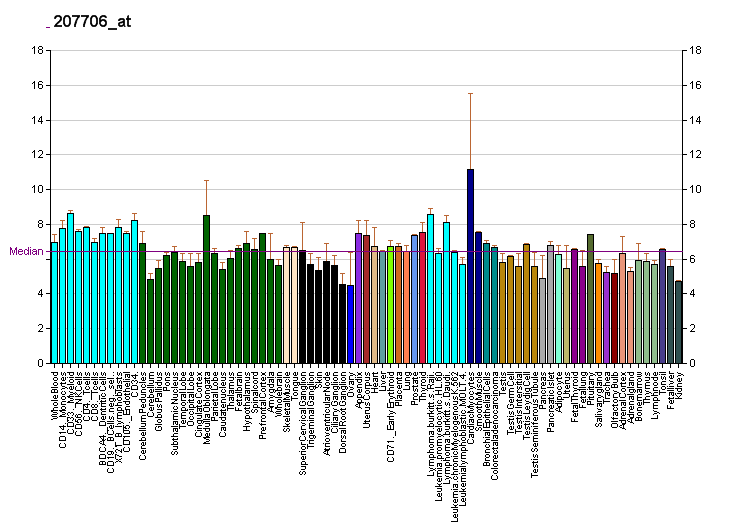
RNA expression pattern
Bgee	Human / Mouse (ortholog); Top expressed in: testicle; right lobe of liver; gonad; sperm; islet of Langerhans; right testis; left testis; apex of heart; muscle of thigh; right auricle of heart / Top expressed in: neural layer of retina; zygote; spermatid; Jacobson's organ; spermatocyte; secondary oocyte; embryo; primary oocyte; morula; blastocyst; More reference expression data
BioGPS	More reference expression data
Gene ontology
Molecular function	protein homodimerization activity; collagen binding; myosin binding; protein binding
Cellular component	cytoplasm; stereocilium bundle; integral component of membrane; ciliary basal body; cell projection; stereocilium membrane; membrane; photoreceptor inner segment; stereocilia ankle link complex; plasma membrane; photoreceptor connecting cilium; stereocilia ankle link; extracellular region; basement membrane; USH2 complex; apical plasma membrane; periciliary membrane compartment; soma; terminal bouton; stereocilium; synapse
Biological process	response to stimulus; establishment of protein localization; hair cell differentiation; sensory perception of light stimulus; hearing; inner ear receptor cell differentiation; photoreceptor cell maintenance; maintenance of animal organ identity; visual perception; retina development in camera-type eye; animal organ morphogenesis; tissue development; neurogenesis
Sources:Amigo / QuickGO
Orthologs
Databases	NCBI: entry; OMA: entry
Species	Human	Mouse
Entrez	7399	22283
Ensembl	ENSG00000042781	ENSMUSG00000026609
UniProt	O75445	Q2QI47
RefSeq (mRNA)	NM_206933; NM_007123	NM_021408
RefSeq (protein)	NP_009054; NP_996816	NP_067383
Location (UCSC)	Chr 1: 215.62 – 216.42 Mb	Chr 1: 187.99 – 188.7 Mb
PubMed search
- Wikidata
View/Edit Human	View/Edit Mouse

Usherin is a protein that in humans is encoded by the USH2A gene.

This gene encodes the protein Usherin that contains laminin EGF motifs, a pentraxin domain, and many fibronectin type III motifs. The encoded basement membrane-associated protein may be important in development and homeostasis of the inner ear and retina. Mutations within this gene have been associated with Usher syndrome type IIa. Alternatively spliced transcript variants that encode different isoforms have been described.
