= Irene Ransburg =

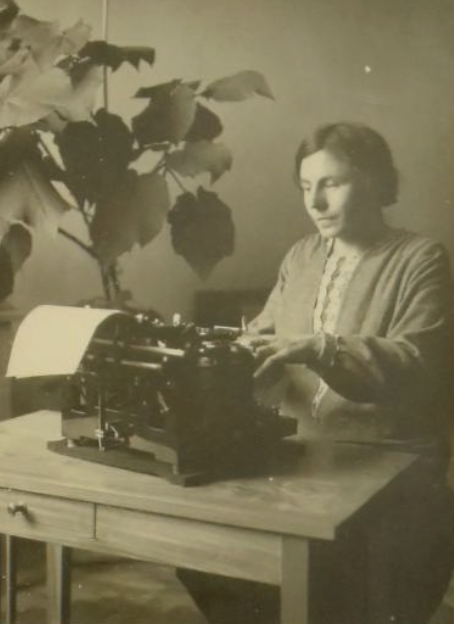
- Irene Ransburg
- Born: November 20, 1898 Graz, Styria, Austria-Hungary
- Died: October 23, 1944 (aged 45) Auschwitz-Birkenau

Irene Ransburg (November 20, 1898 – October 23, 1944) was a Styrian poet who was murdered at the Auschwitz-Birkenau concentration camp. She had been deafblind since the age of sixteen.

== Biography ==
She was born in Graz to Jewish parents. When her parents, Ludwig and Dora Ransburg, died, Irene was adopted by the Brix family in St. Ruprecht an der Raab. Her adoptive parents ran a delicatessen. Irene was baptized and raised in the Catholic faith. She graduated from business school in Graz. At the age of 16, she lost her sight. Soon after, she became deaf. She moved to the Odilien Institute for the Blind in Graz (St. Leonhard).

The director of the Odilien Institute, Abbot Ernst Kortschak of Rein Abbey, did not report Irene Ransburg as a person of Jewish descent during the Third Reich, but in 1944 another resident of the facility denounced her as "Jewish". On September 21, 1944, Ransburg was arrested and sent to the Theresienstadt concentration camp. On October 23, 1944, she was murdered at Auschwitz-Birkenau.

== Stolperstein (stumbling stone) ==
The Stolperstein installed in Graz is the first in all of Europe on which the key details of the person’s life are inscribed in Braille.

== Literature ==
- Marco Jandl/Birgit Roth (eds.), Und wär’ die ganze Welt in Flammen … Irene Ransburg und Gisela Kaufmann – Zwei blinde Frauen zwischen Selbstbestimmung, Lyrik und NS-Verfolgung. Graz University Library Publishing, 2024.
