= CLRN1 =

Protein-coding gene in humans

Identifiers
- Aliases: CLRN1, RP61, USH3, USH3A, clarin 1
- External IDs: OMIM: 606397; MGI: 2388124; GeneCards: CLRN1

Gene location (Human)
Chr.	Chromosome 3 (human)
Band	3q25.1	Start	150,926,163 bp
Band	3q25.1	End	150,972,727 bp

Gene location (Mouse)
Chr.	Chromosome 3 (mouse)
Band	3|3 D	Start	58,751,449 bp
Band	3|3 D	End	58,792,761 bp
RNA expression pattern
Bgee	Human / Mouse (ortholog); Top expressed in: right adrenal cortex; buccal mucosa cell; testicle; left adrenal cortex; gonad; jejunal mucosa; duodenum; skin of hip; blood; pituitary gland / Top expressed in: otolith organ; utricle; otic vesicle; spinal ganglia; lens; auditory system; organ of Corti; dentate gyrus of hippocampal formation granule cell; spiral ganglion; epithelium of lens; More reference expression data
BioGPS	n/a
Orthologs
Databases	NCBI: entry; OMA: entry
Species	Human	Mouse
Entrez	7401	229320
Ensembl	ENSG00000163646	ENSMUSG00000043850
UniProt	P58418	Q8K445
RefSeq (mRNA)	NM_001195794; NM_001256819; NM_052995; NM_174878; NM_174880	NM_153384; NM_153385; NM_153386
RefSeq (protein)	NP_001182723; NP_001243748; NP_443721; NP_777367	NP_700433; NP_700434; NP_700435
Location (UCSC)	Chr 3: 150.93 – 150.97 Mb	Chr 3: 58.75 – 58.79 Mb
PubMed search
- Wikidata
View/Edit Human	View/Edit Mouse

Clarin-1 is a protein that in humans is encoded by the CLRN1 gene.

== Function ==
This gene encodes a protein that contains a cytosolic N-terminus, multiple helical transmembrane domains, and an endoplasmic reticulum membrane retention signal, TKGH, in the C-terminus. The encoded protein may be important in development and homeostasis of the inner ear and retina. Mutations within this gene have been associated with Usher syndrome type IIIa. Multiple transcript variants encoding distinct isoforms have been identified for this gene.
