= Tacpac =

Tacpac, styleized as TACPAC (derived from "tactile approach to communication package") is a sensory communication resource using touch and music to develop communication skills. It helps those who have sensory impairment or communication difficulties. It can also help those who have tactile defensiveness, learning difficulties, autism, Down syndrome, and dementia.

== Design ==
TACPAC uses music that matches the texture of the object for each activity so that those undergoing TACPAC have an aligned experience. Users can employ this to help them communicate.

TACPAC comes in the form of a subscription that is accessed on a website and also via an app for phones and tablets. The resources include music tracks, instruction videos, and downloadable/printable record and instruction sheets. Users can play the music tracks without an internet connection.

Through repetition, a receiver learns to express responses that can be understood: e.g., those manifesting like/dislike; desire/rejection; and know/ignorance. Users can begin to respond to stimuli, anticipate activities and relate to the helper. These primal responses that comprise pre-intentional and affective communication can be crucial steps toward more clearly defined intentional communication and even language acquisition.

Special-needs educator Laura Pease writes:

"One of the most effective ways of establishing contact with deafblind children and so encouraging a communicative response is to share activities with high levels of physical contact and pleasant sensations. These include [...] Tacpac, a package where taped music is linked to a range of tactile sensations."

== Reception ==
The number of research projects around TACPAC is growing and it has growing support amongst multi-sensory impairment networks and the UK's Royal National Institute of Blind People.

== Bibliography ==
- Pease, Laura (2000). "Creating a communicating environment". In Clarke, Catherine; Janet, Eyre; Lewis, Pease (eds.). Teaching Children who are Deafblind: Contact, Communication and Learning. London: David Fulton.
- Panter, Anna (2004). "Let the fun begin! Communicating through touch the TACPAC way". Eye Contact. No. 39. Royal National Institute of Blind People. pp. 31–34. Archived from the original on 28 September 2007.
- Serpa, Ximena (8 October 2001), Workshop No.4, 7th Helen Keller World Conference, archived from the original on 4 February 2002
- Murray, Sue; Ells, Rosemarie; Wainer, Hilary (2007), 'Tacpac - a tactile approach to communication through touch', Perth: South Pacific Educators for Visual Impairment Biennial Conference - research paper on Tacpac including perspectives of parents, speech and language therapists, physiotherapists, occupational therapists, and music therapists.
