= Helen Keller National Center for Deaf-Blind Youths and Adults =

U.S. organization for the deaf-blind

The Helen Keller National Center for Deaf-Blind Youths and Adults (also known as the Helen Keller National Center or HKNC) is a foundation in the United States that provides services for individuals who, like Helen Keller, are both blind and deaf.

== Description ==
Authorized by an Act of Congress in 1967, the Center provides nationwide services for people who are deaf-blind according to the definition of deaf-blindness in the Helen Keller Act. It operates a residential rehabilitation and training facility at its headquarters in Sands Point, New York, which opened in 1976, and a system of ten regional field offices, also supporting families and professional carers. In 2010 the Center served 72 adult training clients and specialized short term training for 26 clients; in addition the regional programs served 1,478 consumers, 441 families, and 881 organizations. The organization provides independent living skills training, referral, employment training, counseling, and transition assistance for individuals well as technical assistance and training for service providers. There is an international internship program for professionals.

The Center is funded in part by the Rehabilitation Services Administration of the U.S. Department of Education. In 2001, federal government provided $8.5 million a year of the $11 million annual operating costs. Congressional findings were that the Center "is a vital national resource for meeting the needs of individuals who are deaf-blind and no State currently has the facilities or personnel to meet such needs".

There are about 70,000 deaf-blind people in the United States. Most have Usher syndrome, a congenital disorder in which the individual is born deaf and there is loss of sight by adolescence. Federal law mandates that individual states take responsibility for education until the age of 16, after which the Center takes over.

== See also ==
- Helen Keller Services for the Blind
