= Helen May Martin =

American deaf and blind pianist

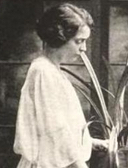
- Helen May Martin, from a 1923 publication.
- Born: December 18, 1893; Lincoln, Nebraska
- Died: June 13, 1947 (aged 53); Merriam, Kansas
- Occupation: Pianist

Helen May Martin (December 18, 1893 – June 13, 1947) was an American pianist. Helen Keller called Martin "the most accomplished deaf and blind person in the world."

== Early life ==
Helen May Martin was born in Lincoln, Nebraska, the daughter of John Henry Martin, a salesman, and Helen Smith Martin, a teacher and milliner. She was deaf and blind from childhood. Her mother taught her music using tactile illustrations with dried beans. Martin graduated from the Kansas State School for the Deaf in Olathe, though students who were also blind had not previously been admitted. She later attended a music conservatories in Wichita and Cincinnati, with her mother helping to interpret spoken instruction into hand signs in Martin's palm.

== Career ==
Martin began giving concerts for the public in 1922, in Olathe. She toured and performed in cities across the United States, for over twenty years, often sponsored by the Lions Club service organization. She was often presented as a "girl", though her concert career began when she was nearly thirty years old.

Martin collected sheet music in braille and other raised print systems, and memorized hundreds of compositions. She also played the harp, and used a typewriter. She listened to live and broadcast music while holding an empty metal can in her hands, to capture the vibrations.

Martin met Helen Keller in Lincoln. Keller scolded a reporter for calling Martin "a second Helen Keller," saying "She is not a 'second' to me, for she has done what I could never do; she has made of herself an accomplished pianist and musician.... She is the most accomplished deaf and blind person in the world."

== Personal life ==
Martin lived in Merriam, Kansas with her mother and her sister Gertrude. Gertrude died in 1939. Helen May Martin died in Merriam in 1947, aged 53 years.
