= Oscar Liebreich =

German pharmacologist

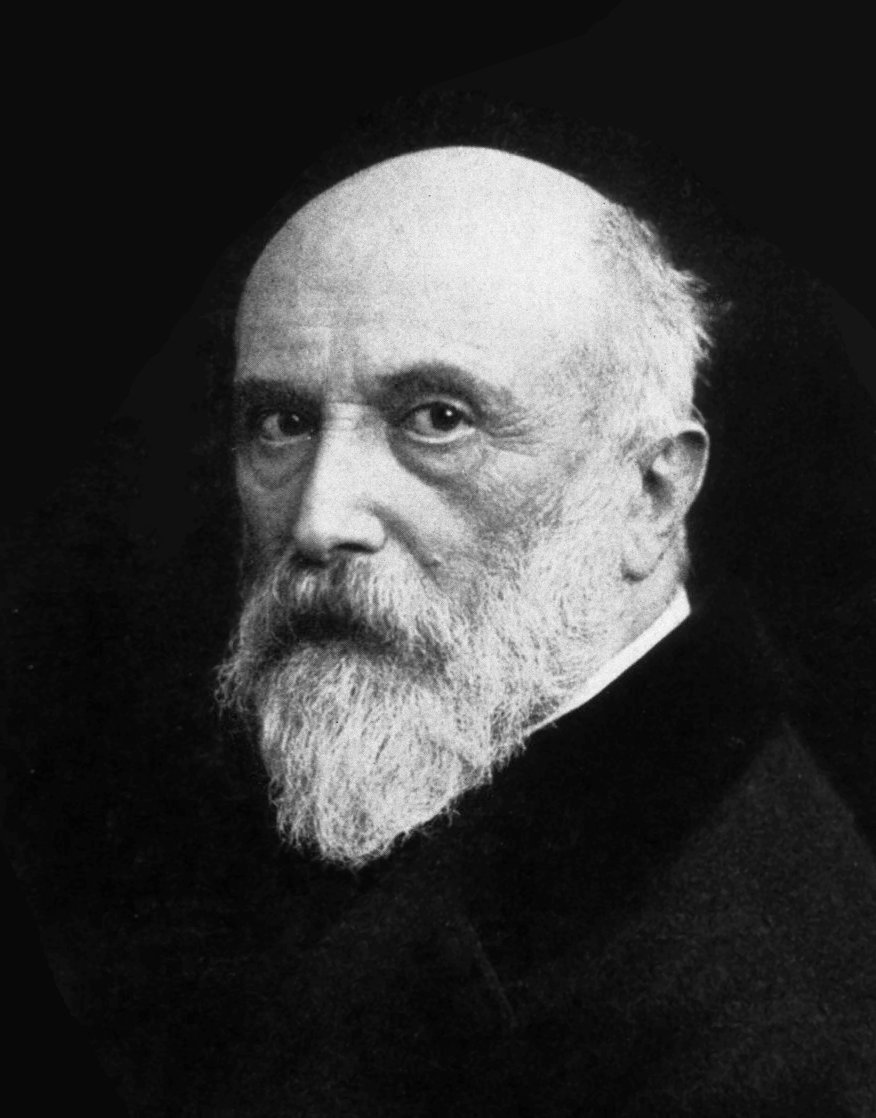
- Oscar Liebreich
- Born: 14 February 1839; Königsberg, German Confederation
- Died: 2 July 1908 (aged 69); Berlin, German Empire
- Education: University of Wiesbaden, University of Berlin
- Known for: sedative chloral hydrate
- Scientific career
- Workplaces: Pharmacology Institute in Berlin, Balneologischen Gesellschaft
- Doctoral advisor: Carl Remigius Fresenius chemistry, Rudolf Virchow medicine

Matthias Eugen Oscar Liebreich (14 February 1839 – 2 July 1908) was a German pharmacologist.

== Biography ==
He was a native of Königsberg. He studied chemistry under Carl Remigius Fresenius (1818–1897) in Wiesbaden, and studied medicine in Königsberg, Tübingen and Berlin, obtaining his degree in 1865. Beginning in 1867, he worked as an assistant in the chemistry department of the pathological institute under Rudolf Virchow. Later on, he became a professor of therapeutics (1868) and director of the pharmacology institute in Berlin (1872). In 1889 he was co-founder of the Balneologischen Gesellschaft (Balneology Society) in Berlin, and was its chairman until his death in 1908.

== Contributions ==
Liebreich introduced the method of phaneroscopic illumination for the study of lupus; showed the value of cantharidin in tuberculosis, of mercuric formamide and of lanolin in syphilis, of butylchloral hydrate and of ethylene chloride (Note: The modern chemical which has anesthetic properties which is referred to as ethylene chloride is vinyl chloride, which is toxic.) as anesthetics. In 1865, he gave the name "protagon" to a proximate principle discovered in the brain and in blood corpuscles.

He is well known for his investigations pertaining to the sedative and hypnotic properties of chloral hydrate (1869), and was an important factor in the drugs' popularity during the latter half of the 19th century. He also made valued contributions in his chemical research of boracic acid.

Liebreich edited the Therapeutische Monatshefte (1887 sqq.) and the Encyklopädie der Therapie (1895 sqq.), and with Alexander Langgard, published a Kompendium der Arzneiverordnung (5th ed. 1902).

== Works ==
- Compendium der Arzneiverordnung : nach der Pharmakopoe für das deutsche Reich und den neuesten fremden Pharmakopoeen . Fischer, Berlin 3., vollständig umgearb. Aufl. 1891 Digital edition / 4., vollst. umgearb. Aufl. 1896 Digital edition by the University and State Library Düsseldorf
- (translated into English) Effects of borax and boracic acid on the human system London, J. & A. Churchill, 1899.

== Family ==
He was a younger brother of ophthalmologist Richard Liebreich (1830–1917).
