= Marie Heurtin =

French deafblind person

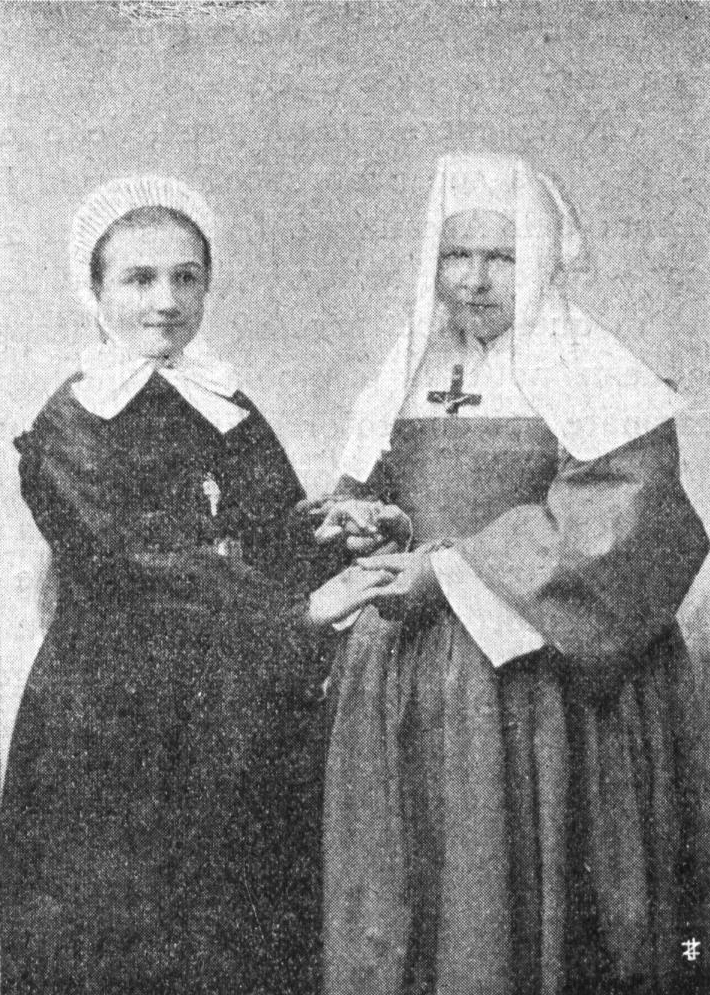
- Marie Heurtin et Sœur Sainte-Marguerite.
- Born: Marie Joséphine Heurtin; April 13, 1885; Vertou
- Died: July 22, 1921; Biard

Marie Heurtin (13 April 1885 – 22 July 1921) was a French deafblind woman. Despite learning no language until the age of ten, Marie was taught to sign, read, and write by the nuns of Notre Dame de Larnay, a convent near Poitiers. As a young adult, Marie helped educate other deafblind girls at the convent, including her younger sister, who was also deafblind.

== Biography ==
Marie Joséphine Heurtin was born on 13 April 1885 in Vertou, Loire-Inférieure. Her parents were Stanislas Aristide, a cooper, and Josephine Marie, a charwoman; they were reported to be second cousins. Marie was the couple's first child of nine, but only six lived past their infancy. Several of the children were born either blind or deafblind, including Marie, who was born deafblind; Stanislas (born 1896), born deaf and partially sighted; and Marthe (born 1902), also deafblind.

Marie spent the first ten years of her life at her family's home with no formal instruction. She was described as having "passionate outbursts of despair and rage." In March 1895, when she was ten, Marie's father brought her to the Notre Dame de Larnay near Poitiers, where two deafblind girls had been taught (Germaine Cambon and Marthe Obrecht). Sister Sainte-Marguerite, the nun who would become Marie's caretaker and teacher, described the scene: "Not a little girl of ten years came into Notre Dame de Larnay, but a raging monster. When the child found that she was left behind by her father and great-aunt she fell into a fury, which hardly abated for two months." After the initial difficult two months, the sisters began trying to teach Marie tactile signing. Marie owned a penknife which she prized highly; the first sign she recognized was the French Sign Language sign for knife, which she used to ask for the return of her knife. She learned to sign the words for eggs, plates, spoons, and other objects from her daily life. Sister Sainte-Marguerite then taught Marie the alphabet and later Braille, "which she came to learn with surprising quickness." She could eventually communicate in six ways: by signs, fingerspelling, reading the Braille and Ballu alphabets, and by writing with a pencil and typing with a typewriter. Marie was taught grammar, arithmetic, knitting, sewing, and other subjects, in addition to abstract concepts like death and God. She was particularly fond of geography, using tactile maps for the blind to explore the terrain of France and Europe. Her biographer wrote that because she was the daughter of a poor couple, "it was not thought desirable to educate her above her class."

Louis Arnould, a professor and teacher of the deafblind, wrote a pamphlet about Marie Heurtin titled Une Âme in Prison ("An imprisoned soul") in 1900, which was later expanded into a book. Arnould described in depth the methods that Sister Ste. Marguerite used to instruct Heurtin.

Around 1909, a 12-year-old deafblind girl, Anne-Marie Poyet, arrived at Larnay. Heurtin joined Sister Sainte-Marguerite in instructing the girl in fingerspelling and Braille. Sister Ste. Marguerite died in 1910, when Heurtin was 24. That same year, Heurtin's younger sister, Marthe, joined Heurtin at Larnay. Marie worked along with the nuns to teach her deafblind sister to read Braille, to knit, and to play games. In 1911 Marie was described as leading a busy life: "As skillful as she is clever, she sews a little and excels in all sorts of crochet-work, knitting, brush-making, and chair-bottoming." She enjoyed playing dominoes with visitors to the convent, and preferred reading and writing to manual labor. Her pious nature made her a favorite of the nuns and students at the school. During World War I Marie kept abreast of the news and knitted socks for soldiers in the trenches. When new deafblind girls joined the school, they looked up to Marie as a role model.

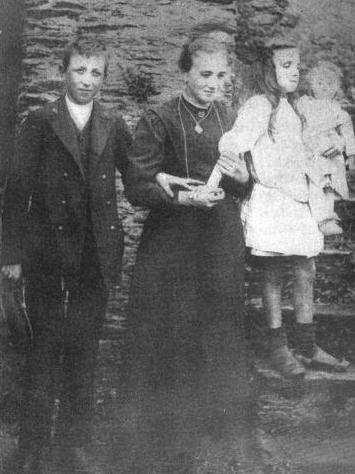
Siblings Stanislas, Marie, and Marthe Heurtin.

In July 1921 both Marie and Marthe caught measles, and Marie fell ill with "a congestion of the breast" (pneumonia). Marie died on 22 July 1921 at age thirty-six and was buried at Larnay.

== Legacy ==
Before the mid-nineteenth-century, it was considered a near impossibility in Europe and the United States to educate deafblind children, especially children such as Heurtin who had been born without sight or hearing. Stories about Laura Bridgman, Helen Keller, and Heurtin proved these children could be taught successfully. Louis Arnould's biography of Heurtin detailed his philosophy about teaching the deafblind and provided information about teaching methods to other educators.

In 2014, Jean-Pierre Améris directed a dramatized biographical film of Heurtin's relationship with Sister Sainte-Marguerite titled Marie Heurtin (in English, Marie's Story).

== Bibliography ==
- Arnould, Louis (1903). Une âme en prison : histoire de l'éducation d'une aveugle-sourde-muette de naissance (2nd ed.). Paris: Oudin.
