= Deafblindness =

Condition of little or no useful sight and little or no useful hearing

Deafblindness is a condition of little or no useful hearing and little or no useful sight. Different degrees of vision loss and auditory loss occur within each individual. Because of this, deafblind people require varied management plans in order to improve their outcomes in areas such as communication, education, work, and general life satisfaction.

According to the Nordic Leadership Forum on Deafblindness, it is a distinct disability, as the impairment of one organ makes it difficult to compensate for the impairment of the other.

The deafblind community has its own culture, comparable to those of the Deaf community. Some deafblind individuals view their condition as a part of their identity.

== Types ==
The medical condition of deafblindness occurs in different forms. For some, this condition might happen congenitally from birth as a result of genetic defect, for others it happens suddenly due to a form of illness or accident that results in a modality deprivation of either vision or hearing, or both. A person might be born deaf and become blind at a later stage in life, or vice versa. In any given case of deafblindness, many possible onsets and causes of this condition exist; some happen gradually, others happen unexpectedly and suddenly. The diagnosis of deafblindness could be medically classified into specific types based on one's symptoms and causes.

The two overarching types of deafblindness are congenital and acquired.

Congenital deafblindness: the condition of deafblindness from birth, as occurs in rubella embryopathy, and other conditions:

- Pregnancy complexities
  - Effects of alcohol/drugs
    - Fetal alcohol syndrome
  - A result of prematurity
  - Causes from illness/infection
    - Rubella
    - AIDS
    - Cytomegalovirus
    - Congenital syphilis
    - Toxoplasmosis
- Genetic conditions (evident from birth)
  - Anomalies/syndromes (numerous genetic defects may contribute to one's medical condition of deafblindness, of which some of more well-known syndromes are listed)
    - CHARGE syndrome
    - Cochleosaccular degeneration with progressive cataracts
    - Down syndrome
    - Marshall syndrome
    - Stickler syndrome
    - Trisomy 13

Acquired deafblindness: condition of deafblindness developed later in life

- Genetic conditions (evident at a later stage in life)
  - Usher syndrome
  - Alport syndrome
- Age-related loss of modality (vision or auditory or both)
- Illness, such as meningitis
- Somatic injuries
  - Brain damage/trauma
  - Stroke
  - Permanent physical damage (relating to vision or hearing)

== Communication ==
Deafblind people communicate in many different ways as determined by the nature of their condition, the age of onset, and what resources are available to them. For example, someone who grew up deaf and experienced vision loss later in life is likely to use a sign language (in a visually modified or tactile form). Others who grew up blind and later became deaf are more likely to use a tactile mode of spoken/written language. Methods of communication include:

- Use of residual hearing (speaking clearly, hearing aids, or cochlear implants) or sight (signing within a restricted visual field, writing with large print)
- Tactile signing, sign language, or a manual alphabet such as the American Manual Alphabet or Deaf-blind Alphabet (also known as "two-hand manual") with tactile or visual modifications
- Interpreting services (such as sign-language interpreters or communication aides)
- Communication devices such as Tellatouch or its computerized versions known as the TeleBraille and Screen Braille Communicator.
- Tadoma, a tactile modality
- Square script, a method of writing along tactile guidelines
- Protactile, a tactile language related to American Sign Language in the Francosign language family

Multisensory methods have been used to help deafblind people enhance their communication skills. These can be taught to very young children with developmental delays (to help with pre-intentional communication), young people with learning difficulties, and older people, including those with dementia. One such process is Tacpac.

Deafblind people often use the assistance of people known as support-service providers (SSPs), who help the deafblind with tasks such as routine errands, guiding the deafblind through unfamiliar environments, and facilitating communication between the deafblind person and another person.

== Technology ==
A graphic braille display can be used in sensing graphic data such as maps, images, and text data that require multiline display capabilities, such as spreadsheets and equations. Graphic braille displays available in the market are DV-2 (from KGS), Hyperbraille, and TACTISPLAY Table/Walk (from Tactisplay Corp.). For example, TACTISPLAY Table can show 120×100 resolution refreshable braille graphics on one page.

== History ==
=== United States ===
In 1994, an estimated 35,000–40,000 United States residents were medically deafblind. Laura Bridgman was the first American deafblind person known to become well educated. Helen Keller was a well-known example of an educated deafblind individual. To further her lifelong mission to help the deafblind community to expand its horizons and gain opportunities, the Helen Keller National Center for Deaf-Blind Youths and Adults (also called the Helen Keller National Center or HKNC), with a residential training program in Sands Point, New York, was established in 1967 by an act of Congress.

=== Canada ===
Based on the Canadian Survey on Disability 2022, over 2% of Canada's population aged 15 years and over are deafblind (602,160 people). Of the Canadians aged 15 years and over who are deafblind, 52% of them are aged 65 years and over (314,260 people).

== Awareness ==
In certain countries, including Guatemala and Mexico, activists have utilized knitted graffiti as a tool for deafblindness awareness campaigns.

By Resolution A/RES/79/294, the United Nations designated 27 June as the International Day of Deafblindness.

== In popular culture ==
The play The Miracle Worker (1959), which was adapted into the film The Miracle Worker (1962), recounts Anne Sullivan's efforts to draw Helen Keller from her world of blindness and deafness.

The Who’s album Tommy (1969) tells one continuous life story about a deafblind mute boy named Tommy through songs.

The Bollywood film Black (2005) featured Rani Mukerji as a deafblind character named Michelle McNally.

The film Marie's Story (2014) relates the childhood and education of Marie Heurtin (1885–1921), a deafblind woman.

Haben Girma, the first deafblind individual to graduate from Harvard Law School, released an autobiography entitled Haben: The Deafblind Woman Who Conquered Harvard Law (2019).

Feeling Through (2019) is an American short drama film directed by Doug Roland that was the first film ever to star a deafblind actor (Robert Tarango) in a lead role; it is about a teenager and a deafblind man. It was nominated for the 2021 Academy Award for Best Live Action Short Film.

The Persistence of Vision is a 1978 novella by John Varley describing the life of a blind-and-deaf community.

Beginning in 1922, Helen May Martin (1893-1947) performed across the United States as a concert pianist.

Irene Ransburg was an Austrian poet of Jewish descent who was later baptized a Catholic and lived in a Catholic home for the blind. In 1944, she was deported to Theresienstadt and murdered. A memorial stone was placed near her home, the first such Stolperstein to be written in Braille.

== See also ==
- Tangible symbol systems
- Land of Silence and Darkness
- White cane (used by blind people to assist them in walking)
