= PCDH15 =

Protein-coding gene in the species Homo sapiens

Identifiers
- Aliases: PCDH15, CDHR15, DFNB23, USH1F, protocadherin-related 15, protocadherin related 15
- External IDs: OMIM: 605514; MGI: 1891428; GeneCards: PCDH15
Available structures
PDB	Ortholog search: PDBe RCSB
PDB	List of PDB id codes 4APX, 4AQ8, 4AQA, 4AQE, 4AXW

Gene location (Human)
Chr.	Chromosome 10 (human)
Band	10q21.1	Start	53,802,771 bp
Band	10q21.1	End	55,627,942 bp

Gene location (Mouse)
Chr.	Chromosome 10 (mouse)
Band	10 B5.3|10 37.43 cM	Start	73,099,342 bp
Band	10 B5.3|10 37.43 cM	End	74,649,737 bp
RNA expression pattern
Bgee	Human / Mouse (ortholog); Top expressed in: left adrenal cortex; testicle; right adrenal cortex; amygdala; hypothalamus; anterior cingulate cortex; right frontal lobe; nucleus accumbens; C1 segment; anterior pituitary / Top expressed in: neural layer of retina; zygote; substantia nigra; lumbar subsegment of spinal cord; secondary oocyte; Rostral migratory stream; epithelium of lens; Bowman's capsule; mammillary body; primary visual cortex; More reference expression data
BioGPS	n/a
Gene ontology
Molecular function	calcium ion binding
Cellular component	integral component of membrane; extracellular region; plasma membrane; photoreceptor outer segment; synapse; membrane; stereocilium; extracellular space; integral component of plasma membrane
Biological process	inner ear development; photoreceptor cell maintenance; sensory perception of light stimulus; hearing; equilibrioception; homophilic cell adhesion via plasma membrane adhesion molecules; cell adhesion; cell-cell signaling; nervous system development
Sources:Amigo / QuickGO
Orthologs
Databases	NCBI: entry; OMA: entry
Species	Human	Mouse
Entrez	65217	11994
Ensembl	ENSG00000150275	ENSMUSG00000052613
UniProt	Q96QU1	Q99PJ1
RefSeq (mRNA)	NM_033056; NM_001142763; NM_001142764; NM_001142765; NM_001142766 NM_001142767; NM_001142768; NM_001142769; NM_001142770; NM_001142771; NM_001142772; NM_001142773; NM_001354404; NM_001354411; NM_001354420; NM_001354429; NM_001354430; NM_001384140	NM_001142735; NM_001142736; NM_001142737; NM_001142738; NM_001142739 NM_001142740; NM_001142741; NM_001142742; NM_001142743; NM_001142746; NM_001142747; NM_001142748; NM_001142760; NM_023115
RefSeq (protein)	NP_001136235; NP_001136236; NP_001136237; NP_001136238; NP_001136239 NP_001136240; NP_001136241; NP_001136242; NP_001136243; NP_001136244; NP_001136245; NP_149045; NP_001341333; NP_001341340; NP_001341349; NP_001341358; NP_001341359; NP_001371069	NP_001136207; NP_001136208; NP_001136209; NP_001136210; NP_001136211 NP_001136212; NP_001136213; NP_001136214; NP_001136215; NP_001136218; NP_001136219; NP_001136220; NP_001136232; NP_075604
Location (UCSC)	Chr 10: 53.8 – 55.63 Mb	Chr 10: 73.1 – 74.65 Mb
PubMed search
- Wikidata
View/Edit Human	View/Edit Mouse

Protocadherin-15 is a protein that in humans is encoded by the PCDH15 gene.

== Function ==
This gene is a member of the cadherin superfamily. Family members encode integral membrane proteins that mediate calcium-dependent cell-cell adhesion. The protein product of this gene consists of a signal peptide, 11 extracellular calcium-binding domains, a transmembrane domain and a unique cytoplasmic domain. It plays an essential role in maintenance of normal retinal and cochlear function. It is thought to interact with CDH23 to form tip-link filaments.

== Clinical significance ==
Mutations in this gene have been associated with hearing loss, which is consistent with its location at the Usher syndrome type 1F (USH1F) critical region on chromosome 10. Variation within it has also been found to be associated with normal differences in human facial appearance.
