= MYO7A =

Protein-coding gene in the species Homo sapiens

Identifiers
- Aliases: MYO7A, DFNA11, DFNB2, MYOVIIA, MYU7A, NSRD2, USH1B, myosin VIIA
- External IDs: OMIM: 276903; MGI: 104510; GeneCards: MYO7A
Available structures
PDB	Ortholog search: PDBe RCSB
PDB	List of PDB id codes 3PVL

Gene location (Human)
Chr.	Chromosome 11 (human)
Band	11q13.5	Start	77,128,246 bp
Band	11q13.5	End	77,215,241 bp

Gene location (Mouse)
Chr.	Chromosome 7 (mouse)
Band	7 E1|7 53.57 cM	Start	97,700,267 bp
Band	7 E1|7 53.57 cM	End	97,768,731 bp
RNA expression pattern
Bgee	Human / Mouse (ortholog); Top expressed in: right adrenal cortex; left adrenal gland; left adrenal cortex; left testis; right lobe of liver; right testis; anterior pituitary; spleen; paraflocculus of cerebellum; frontal pole / Top expressed in: fourth ventricle; choroid plexus of fourth ventricle; Ileal epithelium; stroma of bone marrow; adrenal gland; yolk sac; retinal pigment epithelium; choroidal fissure; Epithelium of choroid plexus; iris; More reference expression data
BioGPS	n/a
Gene ontology
Molecular function	nucleotide binding; spectrin binding; protein homodimerization activity; protein domain specific binding; ADP binding; calmodulin binding; microfilament motor activity; protein binding; actin binding; cytoskeletal motor activity; ATP binding; microtubule motor activity; microtubule binding; actin filament binding; protein-containing complex binding; protein N-terminus binding
Cellular component	cytosol; photoreceptor inner segment; melanosome; photoreceptor outer segment; stereocilium; photoreceptor connecting cilium; microvillus; lysosomal membrane; cell cortex; apical plasma membrane; myosin VII complex; upper tip-link density; cytoskeleton; myosin complex; synapse; cytoplasm; stereocilium base
Biological process	sensory perception; inner ear receptor cell stereocilium organization; pigment granule localization; sensory perception of light stimulus; post-embryonic animal organ morphogenesis; hearing; mechanoreceptor differentiation; pigment granule transport; auditory receptor cell stereocilium organization; phagolysosome assembly; inner ear auditory receptor cell differentiation; cell projection organization; equilibrioception; inner ear morphogenesis; eye photoreceptor cell development; phagocytosis; inner ear development; inner ear receptor cell differentiation; intracellular protein transport; lysosome organization; visual perception; actin filament-based movement; microtubule-based movement
Sources:Amigo / QuickGO
Orthologs
Databases	NCBI: entry; OMA: entry
Species	Human	Mouse
Entrez	4647	17921
Ensembl	ENSG00000137474	ENSMUSG00000030761
UniProt	Q13402	P97479
RefSeq (mRNA)	NM_000260; NM_001127179; NM_001127180; NM_001369365	NM_001256081; NM_001256082; NM_001256083; NM_008663
RefSeq (protein)	NP_000251; NP_001120652; NP_001356294	NP_001243010; NP_001243011; NP_001243012; NP_032689
Location (UCSC)	Chr 11: 77.13 – 77.22 Mb	Chr 7: 97.7 – 97.77 Mb
PubMed search
- Wikidata
View/Edit Human	View/Edit Mouse

Myosin VIIA is protein that in humans is encoded by the MYO7A gene. Myosin VIIA is a member of the unconventional myosin superfamily of proteins. Myosins are actin binding molecular motors that use the enzymatic conversion of ATP - ADP + inorganic phosphate (Pi) to provide the energy for movement.

Myosins are mechanochemical proteins characterized by the presence of a motor domain, an actin-binding domain, a neck domain that interacts with other proteins, and a tail domain that serves as an anchor. Myosin VIIA is an unconventional myosin with the longest tail (1360 aa). The tail is expected to dimerize, resulting in a two-headed molecule. Unconventional myosins have diverse functions in eukaryotic cells and are primarily thought to be involved in the movement or linkage of intra-cellular membranes and organelles to the actin cytoskeleton via interactions mediated by their highly divergent tail domains.

MYO7A is expressed in a number of mammalian tissues, including testis, kidney, lung, inner ear, retina and the ciliated epithelium of the nasal mucosa.

== Clinical significance ==
Mutations in the MYO7A gene cause the Usher syndrome type 1B, a combined deafness/blindness disorder. Affected individuals are typically profoundly deaf at birth and then undergo progressive retinal degeneration.

== Model organisms ==
Myo7a mutant mouse phenotype
Characteristic	Phenotype
Homozygote viability	Normal
Fertility	Normal
Body weight	Abnormal
Anxiety	Normal
Neurological assessment	Abnormal
Grip strength	Abnormal
Hot plate	Abnormal
Dysmorphology	Normal
Indirect calorimetry	Abnormal
Glucose tolerance test	Abnormal
Auditory brainstem response	Abnormal
DEXA	Abnormal
Radiography	Abnormal
Body temperature	Normal
Eye morphology	Normal
Clinical chemistry	Abnormal
Plasma immunoglobulins	Normal
Haematology	Normal
Peripheral blood lymphocytes	Normal
Micronucleus test	Normal
Heart weight	Normal
Tail epidermis wholemount	Normal
Skin Histopathology	Normal
All tests and analysis from

Model organisms have been used in the study of MYO7A function. A spontaneous mutant mouse line, called Myo7a^{sh1-6J} was generated. Male and female animals underwent a standardized phenotypic screen to determine the effects of deletion. Twenty three tests were carried out on mutant mice and ten significant abnormalities were observed. Male homozygous mutant mice displayed a decreased body weight, a decrease in body fat, improved glucose tolerance and abnormal pelvic girdle bone morphology. Homozygous mutant mice of both sex displayed various abnormalities in a modified SHIRPA test, including abnormal gait, tail dragging and an absence of pinna reflex, a decrease in grip strength, an increased thermal pain threshold, severe hearing impairment and a number of abnormal indirect calorimetry and clinical chemistry parameters.
