= Telari =

Village in West Bengal, India

- Village
- Telari Village
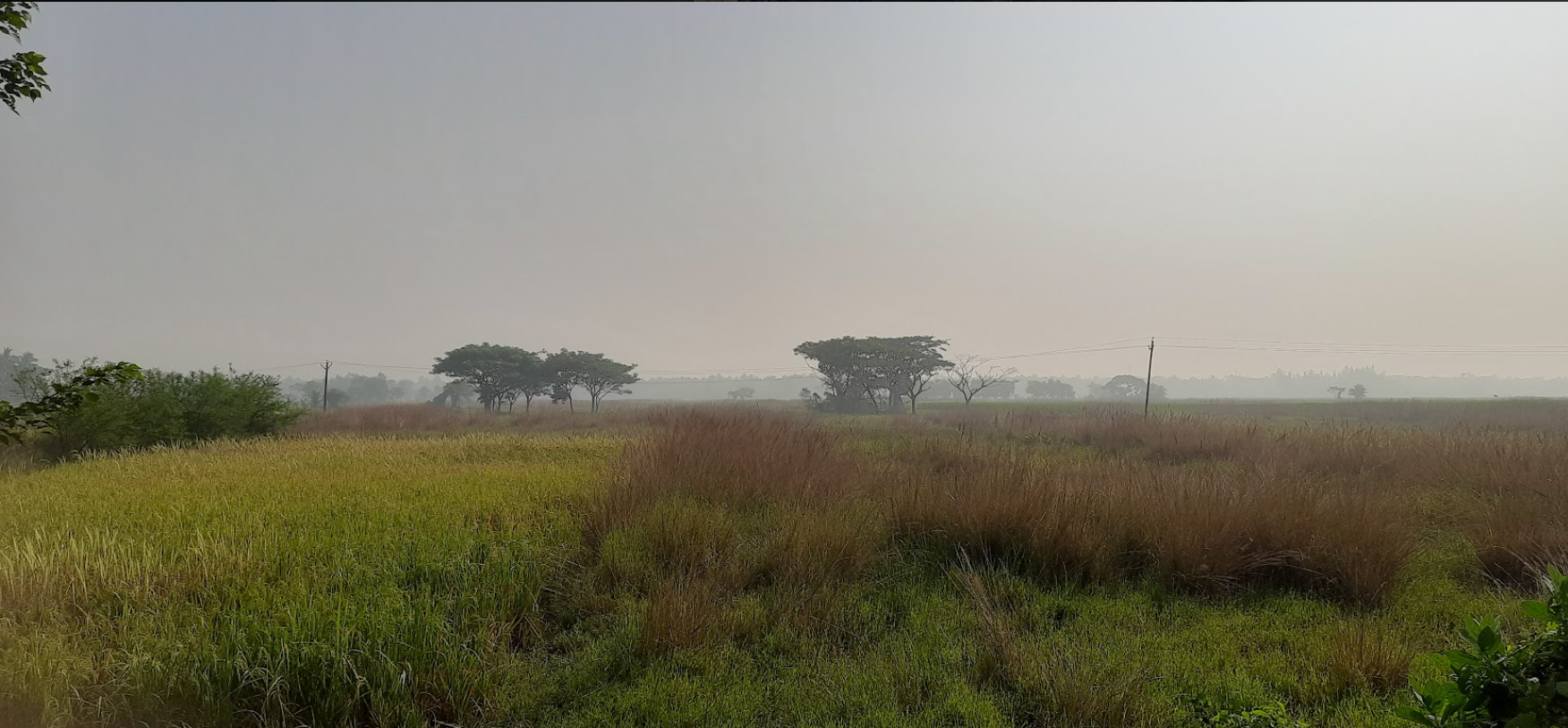
- Interactive map of Telari
- Coordinates: 25.497°N 83.822°E
- Country: India
- State: West Bengal

Population
  - Total: 4,937

Telari is a village in the Budge II subdivision of the South Twenty-Four Parganas district in West Bengal, India. The town is situated approximately 7.4 kilometers away from Burul village, another locality alongside the Hooghly River.

== Geography ==
Telari village spans a total area of approximately 235.01 hectares. It is located approximately 34.5 kilometers from the district headquarters at Alipore. The village is accessible via local roads, with Dakshin Raipur being the nearest town at a distance of about 10 kilometers, which serves as a hub for major economic activities.

== Demographics ==
As per the 2011 Census data, Telari village has a total population of about 4,937 people, with 2,553 males and 2,384 females, indicating a balanced gender ratio. The literacy rate stands at approximately 70.73%, with male literacy at 75.24% and female literacy at 65.90%.

== Administration ==
Telari is administered by a Sarpanch, an elected representative under the Panchayati Raj system, ensuring local governance and development initiatives. The village falls under the Satgachhia Assembly constituency and the Diamond Harbour parliamentary constituency, connecting it to broader legislative frameworks.
