= Helen M. Martin =

American geologist

Helen Mandeville Martin (1889–1973) was an American geological researcher and educator for the Michigan Geological Survey. Martin was known for her work as a geological editor, lecturer and cartographer; her surface formation maps of glacial features in Michigan were used by Michigan industries in their mineral resource sector.

Martin encouraged women to pursue science careers and wrote articles on the emergence of female educators in the 1930s. She promoted conservation education and helped create a conservation school for teachers in Higgins Lake, Michigan.

Martin was a conservation chairperson of the National Council of State Garden Clubs for six years. For her efforts in conservation Martin received awards from U.S. Dept. of Health, Education and Welfare, the Public Health Service, the U.S. Forestry Service, and the American Forestry Association. In 1988 Martin was inducted into Michigan's Women's Hall of Fame.

== Personal life ==
Martin was born in North Dakota in 1889, the daughter of Lawrence Mathew and Mary (Mandeville) Martin. Initially, she attended the University of Michigan to become a writer, but graduated in 1908 with a bachelor's degree in chemistry and geology. Martin then taught geology and physiography at a high school in Battle Creek, Michigan.

In 1916, Martin returned to the University of Michigan to attain her master's degree in geology. She would spend most of her life in Michigan.

After her retirement in 1958, Martin served as a chairperson in the national council of the State Garden clubs. She established a conservation school for teachers at Higgins Lake.

Martin died in 1973.

== Years at the University of Michigan ==
During a survey conducted by the University of Michigan in 1924, Martin recalled her fondest memories: “The old Country Fairs; our Junior Girls Play… the suspense of the mid-year exams; my first ‘Graingers’; the Star riot, and how the upstate papers exaggerated it; the dedication of Memorial Hall; the senior law parties, Michigamua, etc.; etc.; etc. parties.” In this survey, Martin also recalled “...when President Angell stopped me and called me by name – how did he ever know the name of obscure me?”

== Career ==
After receiving her master's degree, Martin worked for several oil companies. She then began working as a geologist in the Geological Survey Division of the Michigan Department of Conservation. Martin retired on December 1, 1958.

Martin's research was focused on the conservation of natural resources in Michigan. Her work includes the compilation of the centennial geological map of Michigan in 1936 and the surface formation map of Michigan in 1955. These maps continue to help industry further mineral resource extraction in the state. Martin also conducted geological surveys of over 13 counties across Michigan.

== Women in geology ==
Martin helped women enter the field of geology, which was historically a male-dominated science. She portrayed a crucial role in the conservation education and wrote of the emergence of female educators in the 1930s.

== Awards and honors ==
Martin was inducted into the Michigan Women's Hall of Fame in 1988.

Martin was listed in Who's Who and Men in Science.

== Martin's works ==
- Outline of the Geological History of Branch County
- Outline of the Geological History of Cheboygan County
- Outline of the Geological History of Hillsdale County
- Outline of the Geological History of Ingham County
- Outline of the Geological History of Kalamazoo County
- Outline of the Geological History of Lenawee County
- Outline of the Geological History of Mecosta County
- Outline of the Geological History of Midland County
- Outline of the Geological History of Oceana County
- Outline of the Geological History of Ottawa County
- Outline of the Geological History of Roscommon County
- Outline of the Geological History of Saginaw County
- Outline of the Geological History of Michigan
- Outline of the Geological History of Shiawassee County
- Co-author of Outline of the Geological History of the Grand Traverse Region
- “Ne-Saw-Je-Wan” as the Ottawas say; A Tale of the Waters That Run Down from Lake Superior to the Sea by Helen M. Martin
- An Index of the Geology of Michigan by Helen M. Martin and Muriel T. Straight
- Geology of Ogemaw County
- Bibliography of Michigan Geology by Edward A. Kirkby & Helen M. Martin
