= Usher syndrome =

Recessive genetic disorder causing deafblindness

- Other names: Usher–Hallgren syndrome
- Usher syndrome is inherited in an autosomal recessive pattern. The genes implicated in Usher syndrome are described below.
- Specialty: Ophthalmology
- Frequency: 0.005%

Usher syndrome, also known as Hallgren syndrome, Usher–Hallgren syndrome, retinitis pigmentosa–dysacusis syndrome or dystrophia retinae dysacusis syndrome, is a rare genetic disorder caused by a mutation in any one of at least 11 genes resulting in a combination of hearing loss and visual impairment. It is the most common cause of deafblindness and is, at present, incurable.

Usher syndrome is classed into three subtypes (I, II, and III) according to the genes responsible and the onset of deafness. All three subtypes are caused by mutations in genes involved in the function of the inner ear and retina. These mutations are inherited in an autosomal recessive pattern.

The occurrence of Usher syndrome varies across the world and across the different syndrome types, with rates as high as 1 in 12,500 in Germany to as low as 1 in 28,000 in Norway. Type I is most common in Ashkenazi Jewish and Acadian populations, and type III is rarely found outside Ashkenazi Jewish and Finnish populations. Usher syndrome is named after Scottish ophthalmologist Charles Usher, who examined the pathology and transmission of the syndrome in 1914.

== Types ==
=== Usher syndrome I ===
People with Usher I are born profoundly deaf and begin to lose their vision in the first decade of life. They also exhibit balance difficulties and learn to walk slowly as children, due to problems in their vestibular system.

Usher syndrome type I can be caused by mutations in any one of several different genes: CDH23, MYO7A, PCDH15, USH1C and USH1G. These genes function in the development and maintenance of inner ear structures such as hair cells (stereocilia), which transmit sound and motion signals to the brain. Alterations in these genes can cause an inability to maintain balance (vestibular dysfunction) and hearing loss. The genes also play a role in the development and stability of the retina by influencing the structure and function of both the rod photoreceptor cells and supporting cells called the retinal pigmented epithelium. Mutations that affect the normal function of these genes can result in retinitis pigmentosa and resultant vision loss.

Worldwide, the estimated prevalence of Usher syndrome type I is 3 to 6 per 100,000 people in the general population. Type I is more common in people of Ashkenazi Jewish ancestry (central and eastern European) and in the French-Acadian populations (Louisiana). Among Acadians, research into haplotype data is consistent with one single mutation being responsible for all cases of Usher syndrome type I.

=== Usher syndrome II ===
People with Usher II are not born deaf and are generally hard-of-hearing rather than deaf, and their hearing does not degrade over time; moreover, they do not seem to have noticeable problems with balance. They also begin to lose their vision later (in the second decade of life) and may preserve some vision even into middle age.

Usher syndrome type II may be caused by mutations in any of three different genes: USH2A, GPR98 and DFNB31. The protein encoded by the USH2A gene, usherin, is located in the supportive tissue in the inner ear and retina. Usherin is critical for the proper development and maintenance of these structures, which may help explain its role in hearing and vision loss. The location and function of the other two proteins are not yet known.

Usher syndrome type II occurs at least as frequently as type I, but because type II may be underdiagnosed or more difficult to detect, it could be up to three times as common as type I.

=== Usher syndrome III ===
People with Usher syndrome III are not born deaf but experience a progressive loss of hearing, and may develop balance problems later in life.

Mutations in only one gene, CLRN1, have been linked to Usher syndrome type III. CLRN1 encodes clarin-1, a protein important for the development and maintenance of the inner ear and retina. However, the protein's function in these structures, and how its mutation causes hearing and vision loss, is still poorly understood.

The frequency of Usher syndrome type III is significant only in the Finnish population as well as the population of Birmingham, UK, and individuals of Ashkenazi Jewish heritage. It has been noted rarely in a few other ethnic groups.

== Symptoms and signs ==
Usher syndrome is characterized by hearing loss and a gradual visual impairment. The hearing loss is caused by a defective inner ear, whereas the vision loss results from retinitis pigmentosa (RP), a degeneration of the retinal cells. Usually, the rod cells of the retina are affected first, leading to early night blindness (nyctalopia) and the gradual loss of peripheral vision. In other cases, early degeneration of the cone cells in the macula occurs, leading to a loss of central acuity. In some cases, the foveal vision is spared, leading to "doughnut vision"; central and peripheral vision are intact, but a ring-like annulus exists, in which vision is impaired., around the central region

== Cause ==
Table 1: Genes linked to Usher syndrome Type I Type II Type III
Type	Freq	Gene locus	Gene	Protein	Function	Size (AA)	UniProt	OMIM
USH1B	39–55%	11q13.5	MYO7A	Myosin VIIA	Motor protein	2215	Q13402	276900
USH1C	6–7%	11p15.1-p14	USH1C	Harmonin	PDZ-domain protein	552	Q9Y6N9	276904
USH1D	19–35%	10q21-q22	CDH23	Cadherin 23	Cell adhesion	3354	Q9H251	601067
USH1E	rare	21q21	?	?	?	?	?	602097
USH1F	11–19%	10q11.2-q21	PCDH15	Protocadherin 15	Cell adhesion	1955	Q96QU1	602083
USH1G	7%	17q24-q25	USH1G	SANS	Scaffold protein	461	Q495M9	606943
USH2A	80%	1q41	USH2A	Usherin	Transmembrane linkage	5202	O75445	276901
USH2C	15%	5q14.3-q21.1	GPR98	VLGR1b	Very large GPCR	6307	Q8WXG9	605472
USH2D	5%	9q32-q34	DFNB31	Whirlin	PDZ-domain protein	907	Q9P202	611383
USH3A	100%	3q21-q25	CLRN1	Clarin-1	Synaptic shaping	232	P58418	276902

Usher syndrome is inherited in an autosomal recessive pattern. Several genes have been associated with Usher syndrome using linkage analysis of patient families (Table 1) and DNA sequencing of the identified loci. A mutation in any one of these genes is likely to result in Usher syndrome.

The clinical subtypes Usher I and II are associated with mutations in any one of six (USH1B-G) and three (USH2A, C-D) genes, respectively, whereas only one gene, USH3A, has been linked to Usher III so far. Two other genes, USH1A and USH2B, were initially associated with Usher syndrome, but USH2B has not been verified, and USH1A was incorrectly determined and does not exist. Research in this area is ongoing.

Using interaction analysis techniques, the identified gene products could be shown to interact with one another in one or more larger protein complexes. If one of the components is missing, this protein complex cannot fulfill its function in the living cell, and it probably comes to the degeneration the same. The function of this protein complex has been suggested to participate in the signal transduction or in the cell adhesion of sensory cells.

A study shows that three proteins related to Usher syndrome genes (PCDH15, CDH23, GPR98) are also involved in auditory cortex development, in mouse and macaque. Their lack of expression induces a decrease in the number of parvalbumin interneurons. Patients with mutations for these genes could have consequently auditory cortex defects.

== Pathophysiology ==
The progressive blindness of Usher syndrome results from retinitis pigmentosa. The photoreceptor cells usually start to degenerate from the outer periphery to the center of the retina, including the macula. The degeneration is usually first noticed as night blindness (nyctalopia); peripheral vision is gradually lost, restricting the visual field (tunnel vision), which generally progresses to complete blindness. The qualifier pigmentosa reflects the fact that clumps of pigment may be visible by an ophthalmoscope in advanced stages of degeneration.

The hearing impairment associated with Usher syndrome is caused by damaged hair cells in the cochlea of the inner ear inhibiting electrical impulses from reaching the brain. It is a form of dysacusis.

== Diagnosis ==
Since Usher syndrome is incurable at present, it is helpful to diagnose children well before they develop the characteristic night blindness. Some preliminary studies have suggested as many as 10% of children with congenital severe to profound deafness may have Usher syndrome. However, a misdiagnosis can have bad consequences.

The simplest approach to diagnosing Usher syndrome is to test for the characteristic chromosomal mutations. An alternative approach is electroretinography, although this is often disfavored for children since its discomfort can also make the results unreliable. Parental consanguinity is a significant factor in diagnosis. Usher syndrome I may be indicated if the child is profoundly deaf from birth and especially slow in walking.

Thirteen other syndromes may exhibit signs similar to Usher syndrome, including Alport syndrome, Alström syndrome, Bardet–Biedl syndrome, Cockayne syndrome, spondyloepiphyseal dysplasia congenita, Flynn–Aird syndrome, Friedreich ataxia, Hurler syndrome (MPS-1), Kearns–Sayre syndrome (CPEO), Neuron Fibromatsis Types I & II, Norrie syndrome, osteopetrosis (Albers–Schonberg disease), Refsum disease (phytanic acid storage disease) and Zellweger syndrome (cerebrohepatorenal syndrome).

=== Classification ===
Although Usher syndrome has been classified clinically in several ways, the prevailing approach is to classify it into three clinical sub-types called Usher I, II and III in order of decreasing severity of deafness. Although it was previously believed that there was an Usher syndrome type IV, researchers at the University of Iowa recently confirmed that there is no USH type IV. As described below, these clinical subtypes may be further subdivided by the particular gene mutated; people with Usher I and II may have any one of six and three genes mutated, respectively, whereas only one gene has been associated with Usher III. The function of these genes is still poorly understood.

Usher syndrome is a variable condition; the degree of severity is not tightly linked to whether it is Usher I, II, or III. For example, someone with type III may be unaffected in childhood but go on to develop a profound hearing loss and a very significant loss of sight by early-to-mid adulthood. Similarly, someone with type I, who is therefore profoundly deaf from birth, may keep good central vision until the sixth decade of life or even beyond. People with type II, who have useful hearing with a hearing aid, can experience a wide range of severity of the RP. Some may maintain good reading vision into their 60s, while others cannot see to read while still in their 40s.

Since Usher syndrome is inherited in an autosomal recessive pattern, both males and females are equally likely to inherit it. Consanguinity of the parents is a risk factor.

== Treatment ==
Since Usher syndrome results from the loss of a gene, gene therapy that adds the proper protein back ("gene replacement") may alleviate it, provided the added protein becomes functional. Recent studies of mouse models have shown one form of the disease—that associated with a mutation in myosin VIIa—can be alleviated by replacing the mutant gene using a lentivirus. However, some of the mutated genes associated with Usher syndrome encode very large proteins—most notably, the USH2A and GPR98 proteins, which have roughly 6000 amino-acid residues. Scientists have successfully treated mice with Usher syndrome type 1C, which has a relatively small affected gene.

In 2025, in Italy, the first-ever case of sight restoration was reported in a 38-year-old patient affected by Usher syndrome type 1B, one year after receiving gene therapy. [https://www.euronews.com/health/2025/07/30/experimental-treatment-restores-sight-to-man-with-genetic-eye-disorder-in-italy]

== Epidemiology ==
Usher syndrome is responsible for the majority of deafblindness. It occurs in roughly 1 in 23,000 people in the United States, 1 in 28,000 in Norway, and 1 in 12,500 in Germany. People with Usher syndrome represent roughly one-sixth of people with retinitis pigmentosa.

== History ==
Usher syndrome is named after the Scottish ophthalmologist Charles Usher, who examined the pathology and transmission of this illness in 1914 based on 69 cases. However, it was first described in 1858 by Albrecht von Gräfe, a pioneer of modern ophthalmology. He reported the case of a deaf patient with retinitis pigmentosa, who had two brothers with the same symptoms. Three years later, one of his students, Richard Liebreich, examined the population of Berlin for disease patterns of deafness with retinitis pigmentosa. Liebreich noted Usher syndrome to be recessive since the cases of blind-deafness combinations occurred particularly in the siblings of blood-related marriages or in families with patients in different generations. His observations supplied the first proofs for the coupled transmission of blindness and deafness since no isolated cases of either could be found in the family trees.

Animal models of this human disease (such as knockout mice and zebrafish) have been developed recently to study the effects of these gene mutations and to test potential cures for Usher syndrome.

== Society and culture ==
=== Notable cases ===
- Rebecca Alexander, a psychotherapist, author, and recipient of the Helen Keller Achievement Award.
- Cyril Axelrod, Catholic priest.
- Catherine Fischer wrote her autobiography of growing up with Usher syndrome in Louisiana, entitled Orchid of the Bayou.
- Katie Kelly, a gold medal-winning paralympian.
- Christian Markovic, and blind-deaf illustrator and designer; Fuzzy Wuzzy Designs.
- The Israeli Nalaga'at (do touch) Deaf-blind Acting Ensemble consists of 11 deaf-blind actors, most of whom are diagnosed with Usher syndrome. The theater group has put on several productions and appeared both locally in Israel and abroad in London and Broadway.
- Karolina Pakėnaitė, a PhD student at the University of Bath diagnosed in 2014, and "seeking to be the first deafblind [person] to reach the summit of Mount Everest".
- Christine "Coco" Roschaert, director of the Nepal Deafblind Project, kick-off speaker for Deaf Awareness Week at the University of Vermont, and participant in the Gallaudet United Now Movement.
- Robert Tarango, first deafblind person to star in a movie, in the role of Artie in the Oscar-nominated short film Feeling Through.
- John Tracy, the son of actor Spencer Tracy and namesake of the oralist John Tracy Clinic.
- Teigan Van Roosmalen, paraolympian.
- Vendon Wright has written two books describing his life with Usher syndrome, I Was Blind but Now I Can See and Through My Eyes.
