= Calx-beta motif =

Protein motif

Calx-beta
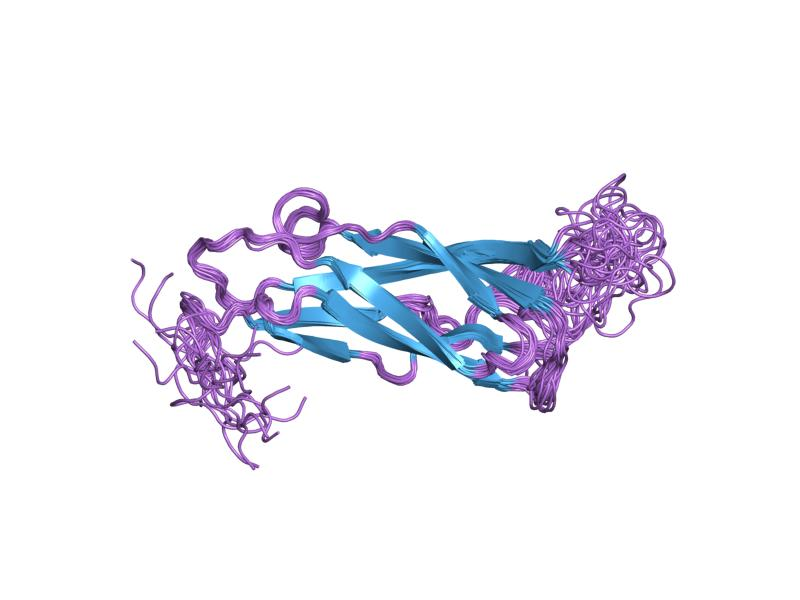
- first ca2+ binding domain of the na,ca-exchanger (ncx1)

Identifiers
- Symbol: Calx-beta
- Pfam: PF03160
- InterPro: IPR003644
Available protein structures:
- Pfam: structures / ECOD
- PDB: RCSB PDB; PDBe; PDBj
- PDBsum: structure summary

In molecular biology, the calx-beta motif is a protein motif which is present as a tandem repeat in the cytoplasmic domains of Calx sodium-calcium exchangers, which are used to expel calcium from cells. This motif overlaps domains used for calcium binding and regulation. The calx-beta motif is also present in the cytoplasmic tail of mammalian integrin-beta4, which mediates the bi-directional transfer of signals across the plasma membrane, as well as in some cyanobacterial proteins. This motif contains a series of beta-strands and turns that form a self-contained beta-sheet.
