= Tip link =

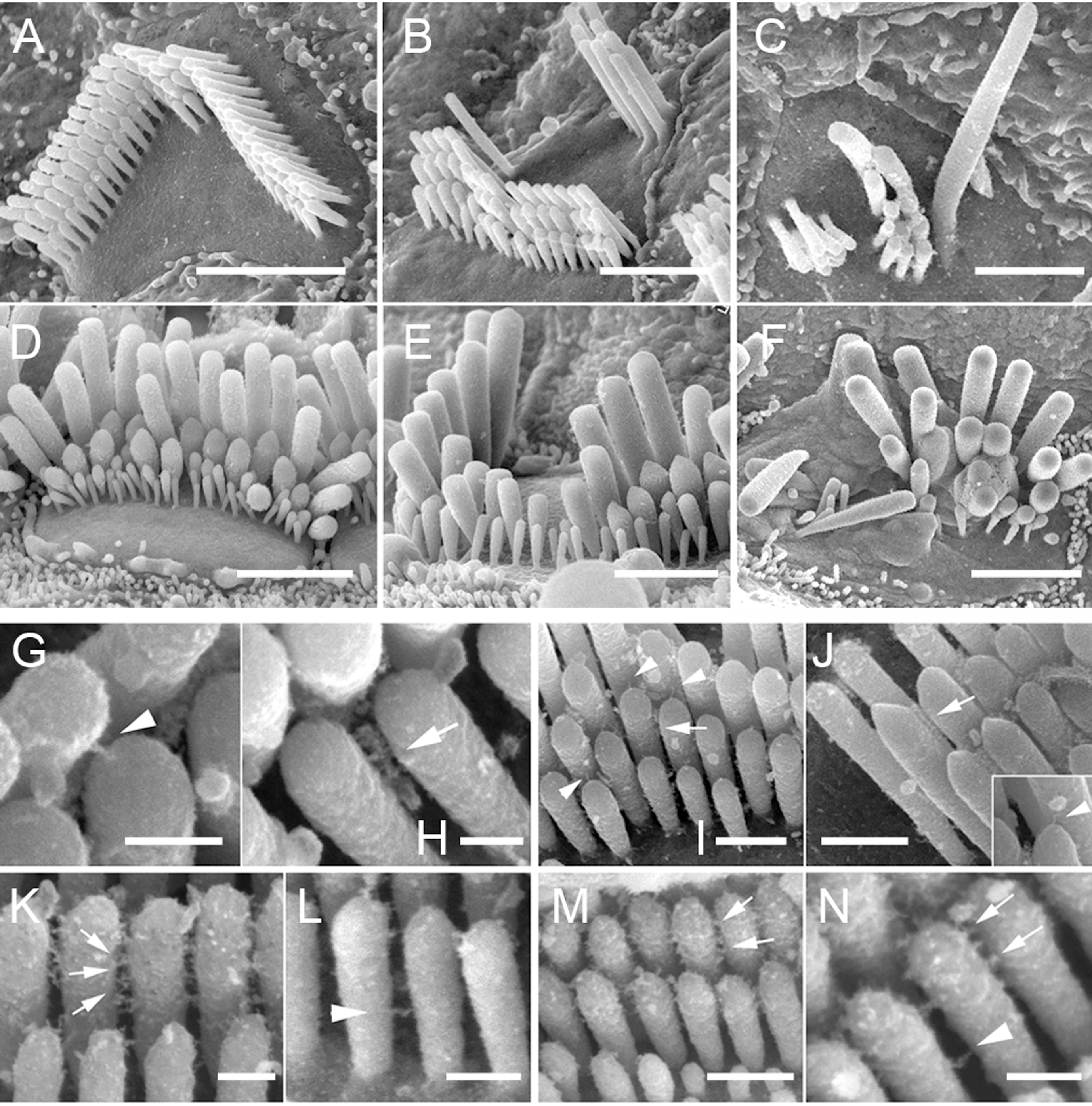
Pictures G-N show the tip links connecting the stereocilia.

Tip links are extracellular filaments that connect stereocilia to each other or to the kinocilium in the hair cells of the inner ear. Mechanotransduction is thought to occur at the site of the tip links, which connect to spring-gated ion channels. These channels are cation-selective transduction channels that allow potassium and calcium ions to enter the hair cell from the endolymph that bathes its apical end. When the hair cells are deflected toward the kinocilium, depolarization occurs; when deflection is away from the kinocilium, hyperpolarization occurs. The tip link is made of two different cadherin molecules, protocadherin 15 and cadherin 23. It has been found that the tip links are relatively stiff, so it is thought that there has to be something else in the hair cells that is stretchy which allows the stereocilia to move back and forth.

It is hypothesized that the tip link is attached to the myosin motor which moves along actin filaments.

== See also ==
- Neuronal encoding of sound
