= Richard Liebreich =

German ophthalmologist and physiologist

Richard Liebreich (30 June 1830 – 19 January 1917) was a German ophthalmologist and physiologist who was a native of Königsberg. He was of Jewish ancestry.

In 1853 he earned his doctorate at Halle, and from 1854 until 1862 was an assistant to Albrecht von Graefe (1828-1870) in Berlin. He subsequently practiced medicine in Paris (from 1862) and London (from 1870), where he was head of ophthalmology at St. Thomas Hospital. He later retired from medicine and moved back to Paris, where he worked as a sculptor and painter. His brother, Oskar Liebreich (1839-1908) was a noted pharmacologist.

In 1863 he published the highly acclaimed Atlas des Ophthalmoscopie, an atlas dedicated to the subject of ophthalmoscopy. He also designed a popular model of ophthalmoscope called the "Liebreich ophthalmoscope". He was interested in the pathological changes of the eye as viewed through the ophthalmoscope, and in 1859 provided a classic description of ocular changes in Bright's disease.

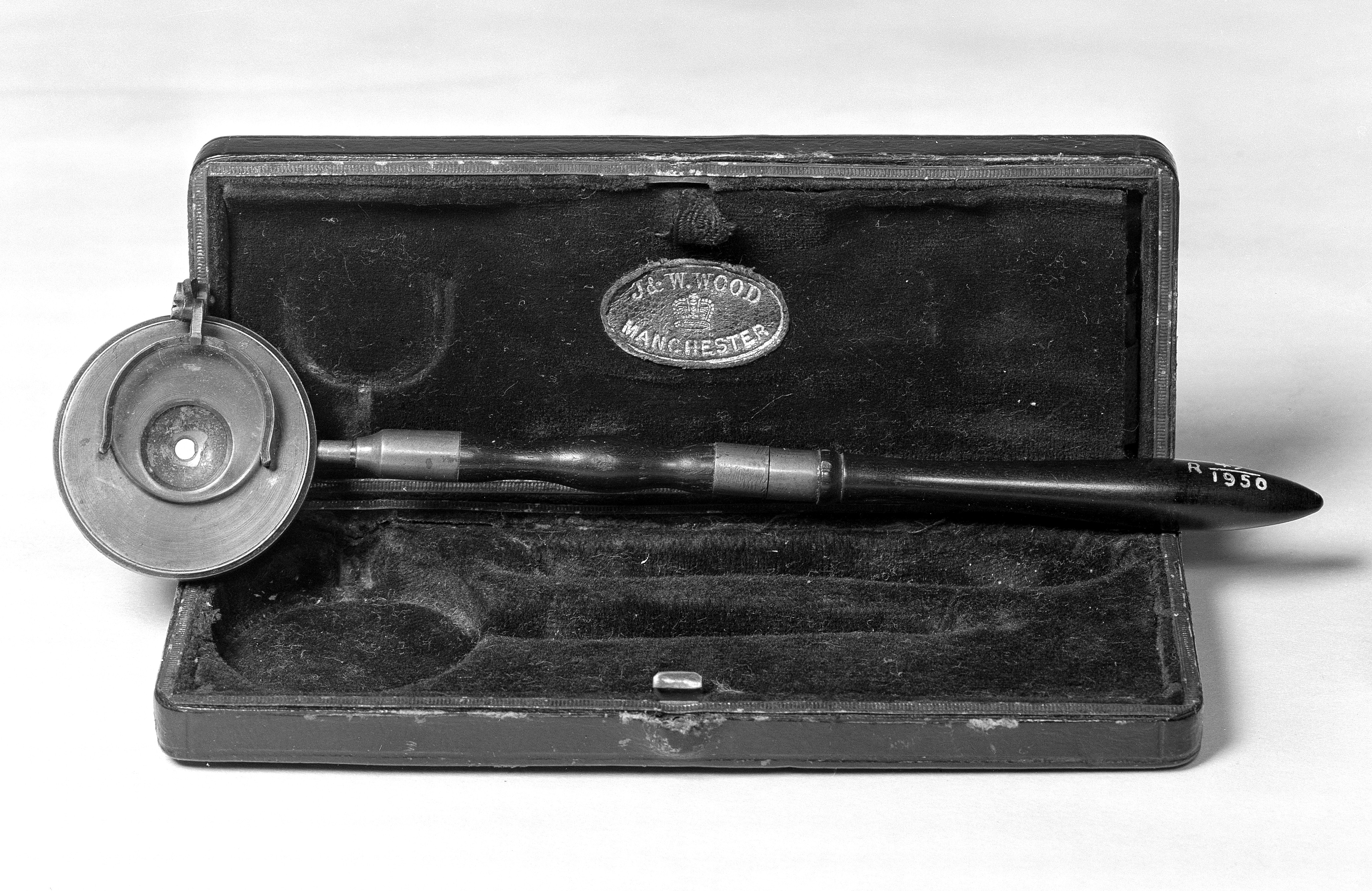
Liebreich ophthalmoscope (ca. 1860)

As an assistant to Albrecht von Graefe, Liebreich performed important research involving Usher syndrome, and demonstrated the combined heritability of blindness and deafness concerning the disease. As a physician in Paris he performed a successful operation on the mother-in-law of emperor Napoléon III.

== Works by Liebreich that have been published in English ==
- "Atlas of ophthalmoscopy, representing the normal and pathological conditions of the fundus oculi as seen with the ophthalmoscope. Composed of 12 chromolithographic plates, containing 59 figures, drawn from nature and accompanied by an explanatory text", (text translated by Henry Rosborough Swanzy) London, J. Churchill and Sons (1870).
- "Effects of Faulty Vision in Painting", in Popular Science Monthly, Volume 1, June 1872.
- "School life in its influence on sight and figure. Two lectures", London, J. & A. Churchill, (1878).
- "Turner and Mulready : the effect of certain faults of vision on painting with especial reference to their works; The real and ideal in portraiture; The deterioration of oil paintings", London : J. & A. Churchill, (1888).
