= Sarah M. N. Woolley =

Neuroscientist

- Education: University of Colorado Boulder, BA, 1991; University of Washington, PhD, 1999
- Scientific career
- Fields: Psychology, Neurobiology
- Workplaces: University of Washington; University of California, Berkeley; Columbia University
- Thesis: Auditory feedback and song behavior in adult Bengalese finches (1999)
- Doctoral advisor: Edwin Rubel

Sarah M. N. Woolley is a neuroscientist and Professor of Psychology at Columbia University's Zuckerman Institute. Her work centers on the neuroscience of communication, using songbirds to understand how the brain learns and understands vocal communication.

== Academic career ==
Woolley received her Bachelors of Arts in 1991 from University of Colorado Boulder, studying biology and psychology. She then attended the University of Washington School of Medicine, where she received her PhD in 1999 in neurobiology and Behavior in the laboratory of Edwin Rubel. Her research centered on how Bengalese finches learn and maintain songs. She found that while male Bengalese finches do not typically change their song patterns in adulthood, their song patterns require auditory feedback. As a result, if a finch becomes deaf, his song will degrade in about one week. Woolley, however, found that not all sound frequencies are required to maintain a male finch's song. Finches that lost the ability to hear in high-frequency ranges maintained their ability to sustain a consistent song pattern. She also noted that these finches can regenerate auditory hair cells, which can restore hearing within eight weeks following damage to them.

For her postdoctoral fellowship, she stayed at the University of Washington, where she performed work to understand the avian auditory midbrain (or the mesencephalicus lateralis, dorsalis, MLd) of zebra finches, which processes multiple parallel inputs and conveys that processed information to the forebrain. She noted that different tones were processed over time in the auditory midbrain and found that this brain region is well-suited to encoding complex sounds with a high degree of temporal accuracy, rather than just responding to specific sound cues.

In 2001, Woolley began a second postdoctoral fellowship at the University of California, Berkeley, where she studied the way zebra finches were able to distinguish vocalizations of specific individuals and also differentiate vocalizations from other sounds. She found that the finch's auditory neurons were better able to more accurately distinguish between different zebra finch songs than between synthetic sound segments, suggesting that their neurons are more finely tuned to understanding finch vocalizations. She looked at how single neurons and populations of neurons in the auditory midbrain encode song versus generic noise. She found that the majority of auditory midbrain neurons were able to consistently and precisely tune in to finch vocalizations, while they exhibited a high degree of variability in response to generic noise.

== Research ==
In 2006, Woolley joined the faculty at Columbia University in the Department of Psychology. Between 2013 and 2016 she served as Chairperson for the department and in 2014 became an elected member of the Kavli Institute for Brain Science.

Her lab studies the underlying neuroscience of the ways bengalese, zebra, and long-tailed finches learn, perform, and understand vocalizations as a model to better understand how humans communicate through sound in a variety of contexts. Her lab has studied the effects of song upon mating choice. All songbird brains are finely tuned to convert sound waves to social messages. Woolley's group found that male and female brains are tuned and wired in different ways.

Her research is supported by the National Science Foundation and the National Institutes of Health.

== Awards and honors ==
- Elected member, Kavli Institute for Brain Science, 2014
- Searle Scholars Program Award, 2007 – 2011
