= Osterberger =

Osterberger is a surname. Notable people with the surname include:

- André Osterberger (1920–2009), French hammer thrower
- Eugenia Osterberger (1852–1932), Spanish pianist and composer
- Kenneth Osterberger (1930–2016), American politician
