= Laignes =

- Commune
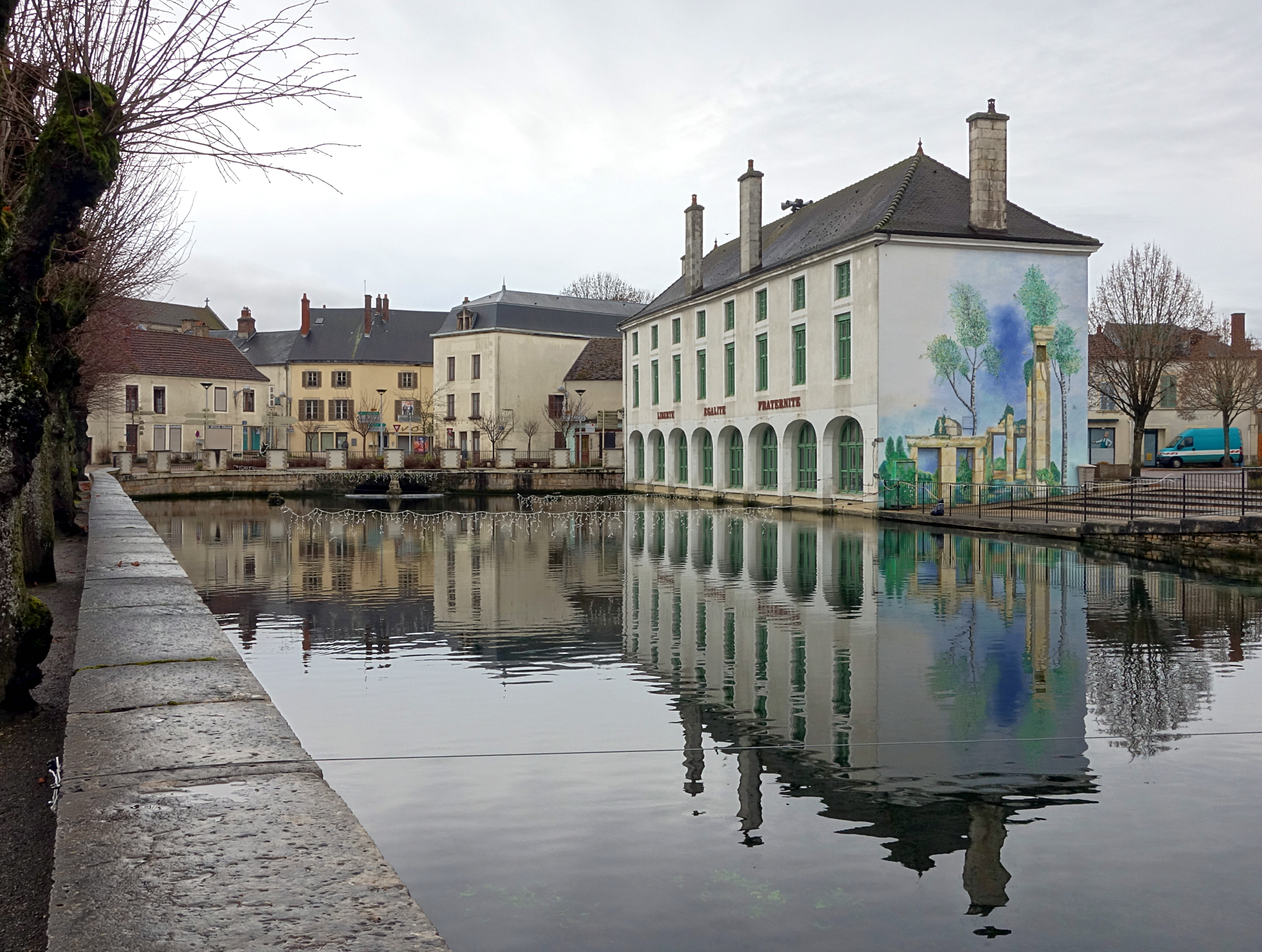
- The town hall and resurgence of the Laigne River

- Coat of arms
- Location of Laignes
- Location within France Location within Bourgogne-Franche-Comté
- Coordinates: 47°50′38″N 4°21′50″E
- Country: France
- Region: Bourgogne-Franche-Comté
- Department: Côte-d'Or
- Arrondissement: Montbard
- Canton: Châtillon-sur-Seine

Government
  - Mayor (2020–2026): Jean-Michel Antoni
- Area^{1}: 40.02 km^{2} (15.45 sq mi)
- Elevation: 214 m (702 ft)
- Highest elevation: 288 m (945 ft)
- Lowest elevation: 202 m (663 ft)
- Population (2023): 668
  - Density: 16.7/km^{2} (43.2/sq mi)
- Time zone: UTC+01:00 (CET)
  - Summer (DST): UTC+02:00 (CEST)
- INSEE/Postal code: 21336 /21330
- ^{1} French Land Register data, which excludes lakes, ponds, glaciers > 1 km^{2} (0.386 sq mi or 247 acres) and river estuaries.

Laignes (French pronunciation: [lɛɲ]) is a commune in the Côte-d'Or department, in the Bourgogne-Franche-Comté region in eastern France.

== Geography ==
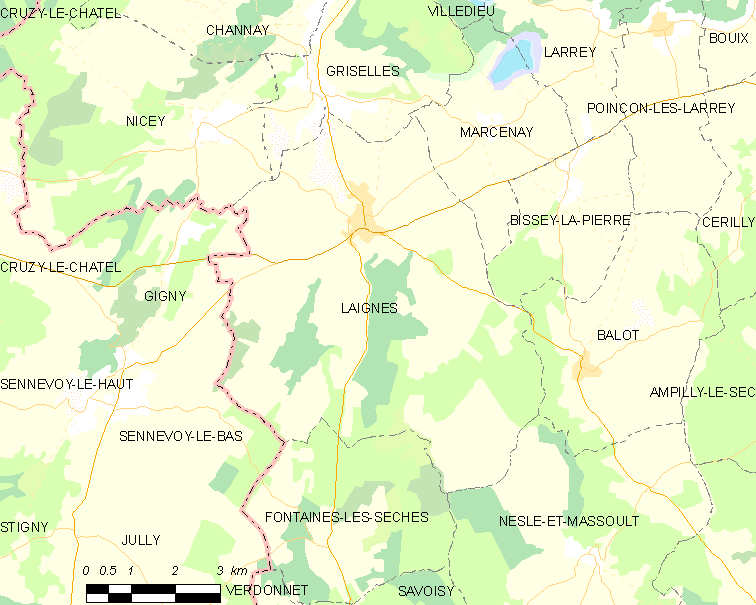

Laignes has a total area of 40 km^{2} (15 sq mi) and an approximate altitude of 220 m.

Near the town hall there is a basin formed by the resurgence of the river Laigne.

=== Accessibility ===
Laignes is traversed by RN 965 from Auxerre to Chaumont.

The nearest train stations are found at Nuits (17 kilometers) and Montbard (25 kilometers). There is a bus connection to Gare de Montbard, a (TGV) station.

== History ==
=== Prehistory and antiquity ===
Refined flints and tombs dating to the Iron Age attest to the antiquity of the site's occupation. The crossing of the roads from Auxerre to Langres and Alise to Vertault made it a very active place for the Lingones during the Gallo-Roman period: an ancient potter's wheel was discovered near the train station bearing witness to the area's artisanal past.

=== Middle Ages ===
Merovingian coins were struck at Laignes, especially those bearing the likeness of Charles the Bald. During this period, Laignes belonged to Tonnerre which passed from the Counts of Champagne to the Duchy of Burgundy. To resist various assaults from armed bands that ravaged the country during the Hundred Years' War, the city surrounded itself with fortifications; of which only a single round tower remains.

=== Modern era ===
On the eve of the French Revolution, Laignes depended on goods from the Bailiwick of Sens in the County of Champagne and spiritual guidance from the Deanery of Châtillon-sur-Seine, part of the Diocese of Langres.

== Heraldry ==
Blazon: "Gules a Bend Or with Two Towers Argent" Comments: Its official status is to be determined.

== List of mayors ==
Term	Name	Party	Description
19th Century	M. Mauris	-	-
1941–1947	Gabriel Beau	-	-
1947–1974	Émile Lepître	Independent Republicans	-
1974–1995	Jean-Pierre Recq	UDF	-
1995–2008	Jean-Paul Noret	Socialist Party	-
2008–Present	Jean-Michel Antoni	UMP	-
This list of mayors is incomplete.

== Demographics ==
Historical population

Year	Pop.	±% p.a.
1793	1,520	—
1800	1,559	+0.36%
1806	1,768	+2.12%
1821	1,514	−1.03%
1831	1,476	−0.25%
1836	1,492	+0.22%
1841	1,563	+0.93%
1846	1,534	−0.37%
1851	1,547	+0.17%
1856	1,421	−1.68%
1861	1,410	−0.16%
1866	1,391	−0.27%
1872	1,380	−0.13%
1876	1,340	−0.73%
1881	1,341	+0.01%
1886	1,289	−0.79%
1891	1,232	−0.90%
1896	1,158	−1.23%
1901	1,149	−0.16%

Year	Pop.	±% p.a.
1906	1,186	+0.64%
1911	1,138	−0.82%
1921	1,068	−0.63%
1926	1,072	+0.07%
1931	1,109	+0.68%
1936	1,051	−1.07%
1946	1,046	−0.05%
1954	1,047	+0.01%
1962	1,032	−0.18%
1968	1,073	+0.65%
1975	1,004	−0.95%
1982	1,008	+0.06%
1990	904	−1.35%
1999	881	−0.29%
2007	885	+0.06%
2012	772	−2.70%
2017	692	−2.16%
2023	668	−0.59%

Source: EHESS and INSEE (1968-2023)

== Monuments and historic places ==
- Église Saint-Didier was designated a monument historique (national heritage site) in 1930. Its furniture and statuary date to the 16th and 17th centuries.
- The sculpture at the resurgence of the river Laigne and the basin at the center of town.
- The former Café des Chiens Blancs (Cafe of the White Dogs), now a multimedia library on the main square near the town hall. It was designated a monument historique in 1995.
- Old freight station on the line from Nuits-sous-Ravières to Châtillon-sur-Seine.
- Old medieval tower near the west entrance of the commune.
- The Chappelle Sainte-Marguerite (English: Chapel of Saint Margaret) on the road to Fontaines-les-Sèches.
- The elementary school.
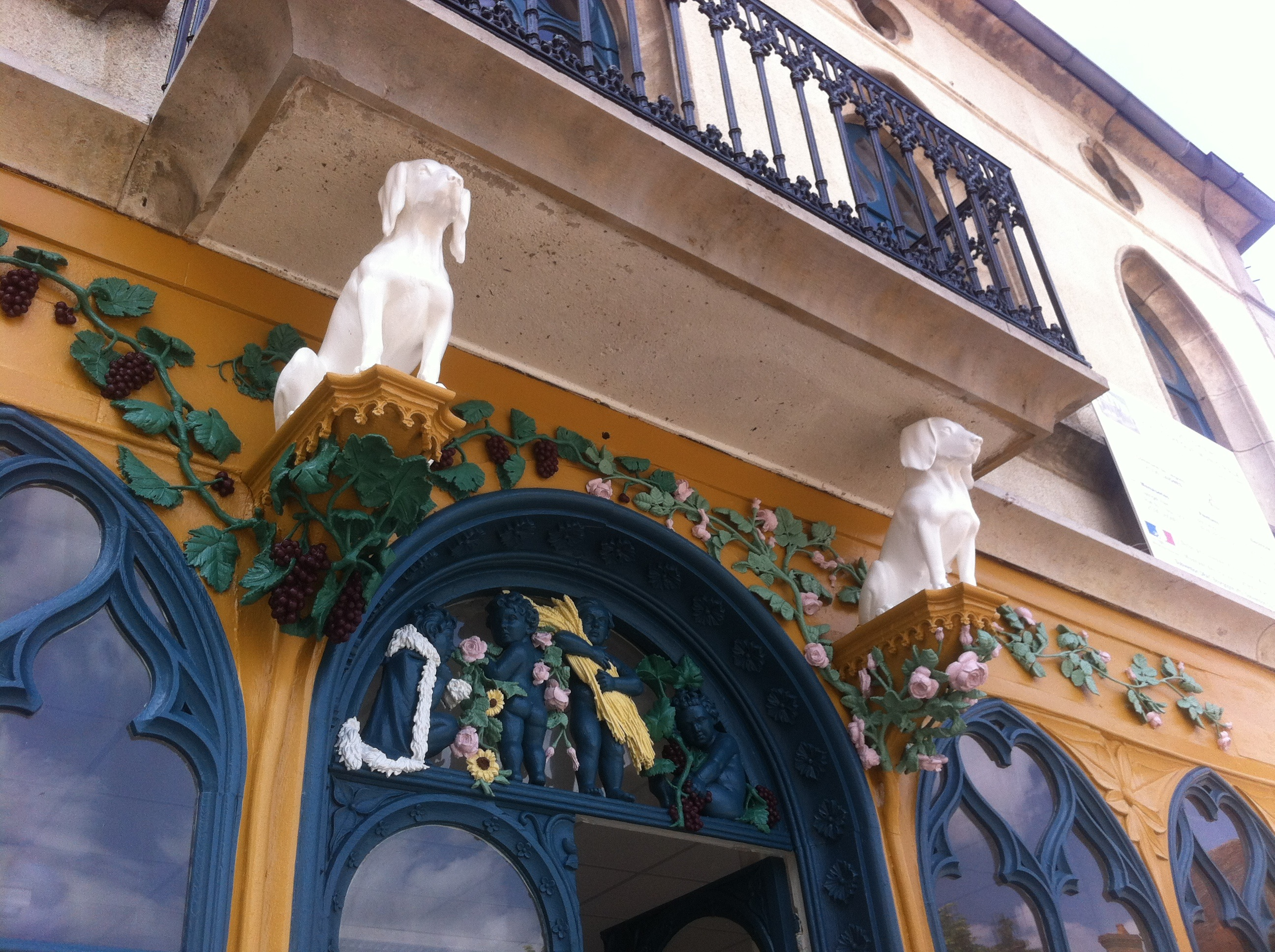
Café des Chiens Blancs.

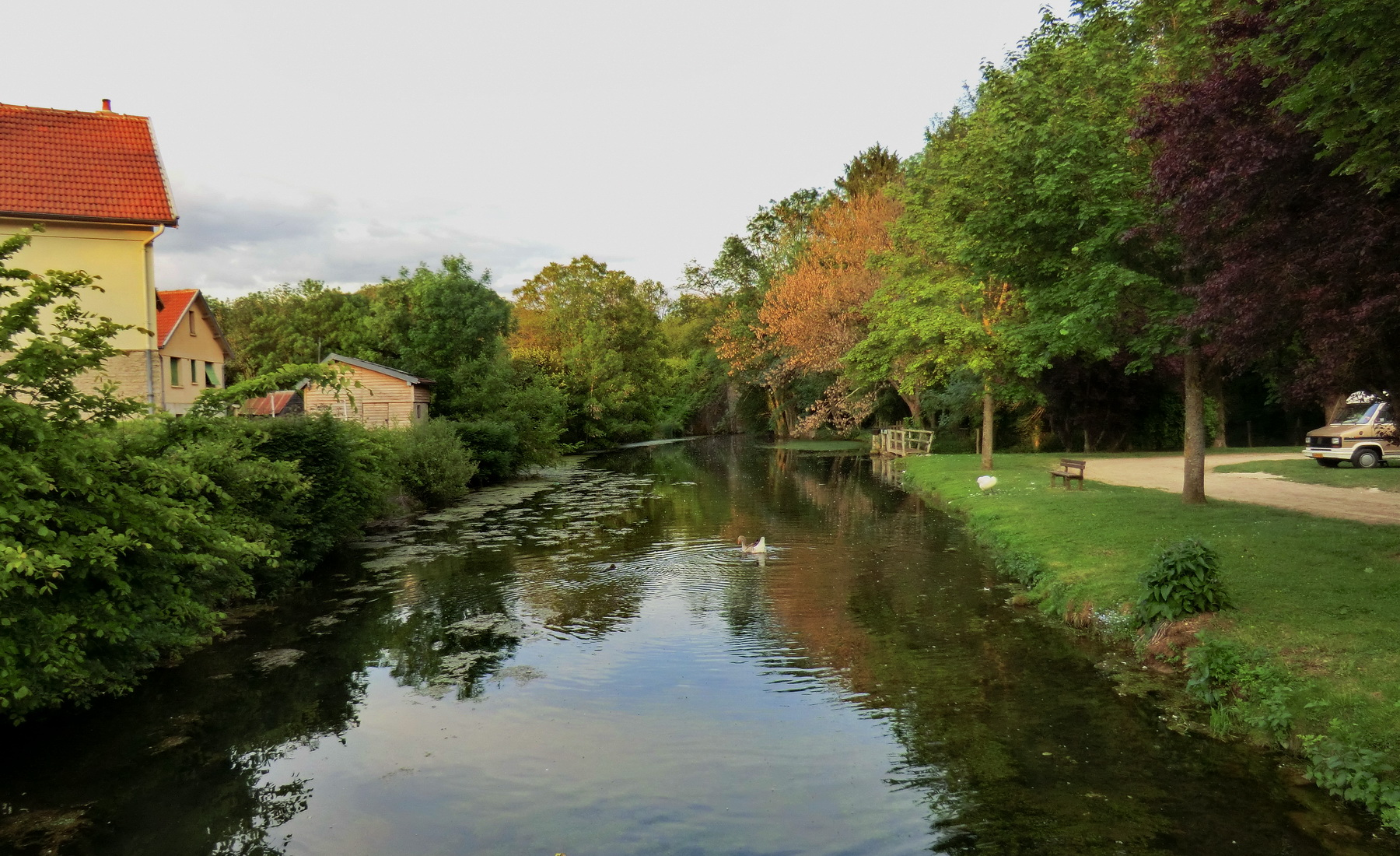
The Laigne.

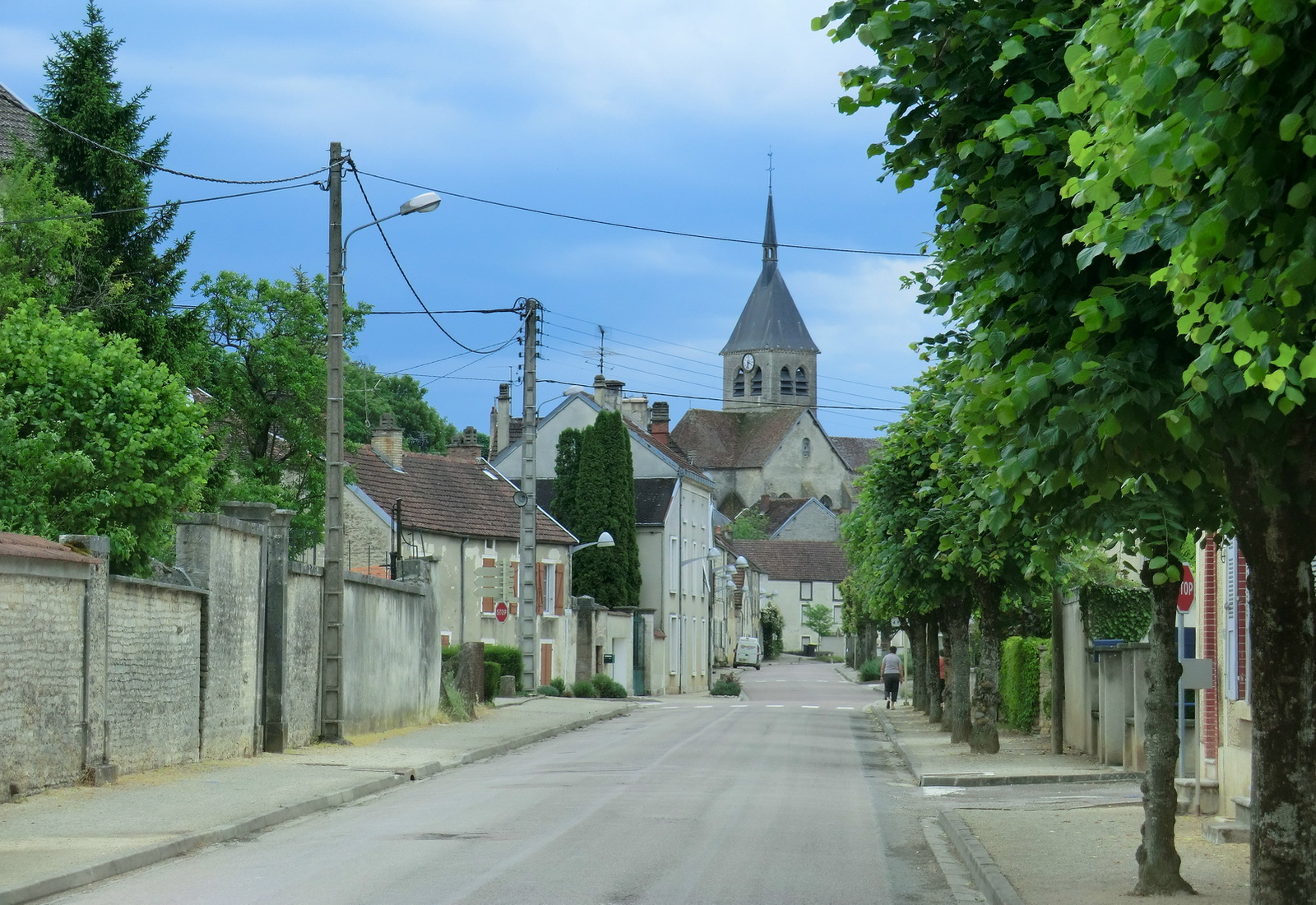
A street in the village.

== Notable personalities ==
- André Metthey, (1871–1920), world-renowned ceramic artist, born 4 June 1871 in Laignes, and died in Asnières-sur-Seine in 1920.
- Christine Petit, born in Laignes in 1948, physician and researcher, professor at the Collège de France and the Pasteur Institute.
- Doctor Paul Robert was born on Réunion in 1904, physician in Laignes from 1930 to 1939, and killed by the Nazis on 11 June 1944 in Essarois.
- André Osterberger, (1920–2009), professional hammer thrower, born 26 Oct 1920 in Laignes. In 1950, he held the French record in the hammer throw with a mark 51.66 meters and had a mark of 52.95 meters in the 1952 Olympics.

== See also ==
- Communes of the Côte-d'Or department

== Bibliography ==
- Le Canton de Laignes par les cartes postales, de Jean Millot et XX, mine d'informations sur Laignes et les environs.
- Le Dictionnaire de l'athlétisme par Robert Parienté, extrait in L'Équipe athlétisme magazine du 10 novembre 1971.
- René Paris (1986), "Aignay-le-Duc, Baigneux-les-Juifs, Laignes", À la rencontre du Châtillonnais, La Bourgogne
