= Karen Steel =

British scientist

Karen Penelope Steel is a British scientist who studies the genetics of deafness, using the mouse as a model to identify the genes involved and to understand the molecular, cellular and physiological mechanisms involved. She is Professor of Sensory Function at the Wolfson Centre for Age-Related Diseases, King's College London. Previously she was Principal Investigator of the Genetics of Deafness research programme at the Wellcome Trust Sanger Institute.

She had a leading role in the collaboration that uncovered Myo7a, the first gene to be implicated in deafness in mice and in humans. Most recently, she led the discovery of Mir-96 microRNA that is implicated in progressive hearing loss in mice and humans.

Together with Christine Petit, Steel won the Royal Society Brain Prize 2012, for pioneering work on the genetics of hearing and deafness.

== Early life ==
In her early academic years, Steel was originally interested in studying English. Her first exposure to biology, and also what solidified her biological science career path, was in sixth grade. Steel had the opportunity to hear Dorothy Hodgkin speak at Bristol University about insulin, marking her first time encountering a woman in science. This experience greatly influenced her interest in studying genetics.

== Education ==
Steel obtained her first degree from Leeds University. She then received her PhD from University College London for her investigatory work into the inner ear in several deaf mouse mutants. She set up the mouse genetics and deafness research programme at the newly established MRC Institute of Hearing Research in Nottingham. Following a second postdoc in Munich, she returned to Nottingham to lead mouse genetics research.

== Research ==
Steel studies the genetics behind deafness, mainly focusing on the genetics of mice to identify the genes involved as well as to further understand the molecular, cellular and physiological mechanisms involved with being deaf. This led to Steel developing a screening technique, a triaging process, that allowed for the characterisation of mutant mice that have hearing and imbalance issues. This led to ability to find and characterise the specific genes involved in these issues, with these issues being caused by altered hair cells or auditory parts. Steel's mouse genetic project also involved knocking out various genes not extensively studied and observing whether these genes are essential or nonessential in the mouse hearing. Steel and her research group have published phenotypic descriptions of over 80 different mouse mutants. Currently, her research is focused on the progressive loss of auditory functions in which she uses the mouse models to diagram the timeline of auditory loss in humans. She also looks for specific mutated genes that are known to contribute and lead to hearing loss, allowing her to target genes that could be potentially targeted in treatments for progressive hearing loss. As of 2014, Steel and her team has found genes involved in progressive hearing loss and has moved forward in identifying the various pathways that these genes are a part of.

== Awards and honours ==
- Recipient of the Kresge-Mirmelstein prize for excellence in hearing research, New Orleans, 1998
- Elected Fellow of the Academy of Medical Sciences, London, 2004
- Elected Council member of Association for Research in Otolaryngology (2004–2008)
- Elected President of International Mammalian Genome Society (2007–2012)
- Edith Whetnall lecturer, Section of Otology of the Royal Society of Medicine, London, 2008
- Elected Fellow of the Royal Society, London, 2009
- Grete Lundbeck European Brain Research Prize, 2012
- Award of Merit, Association for Research in Otolaryngology, 2013

The asteroid 24734 Kareness was named after Steel by its discoverer, Steel's brother.
