= Christine Petit =

French geneticist

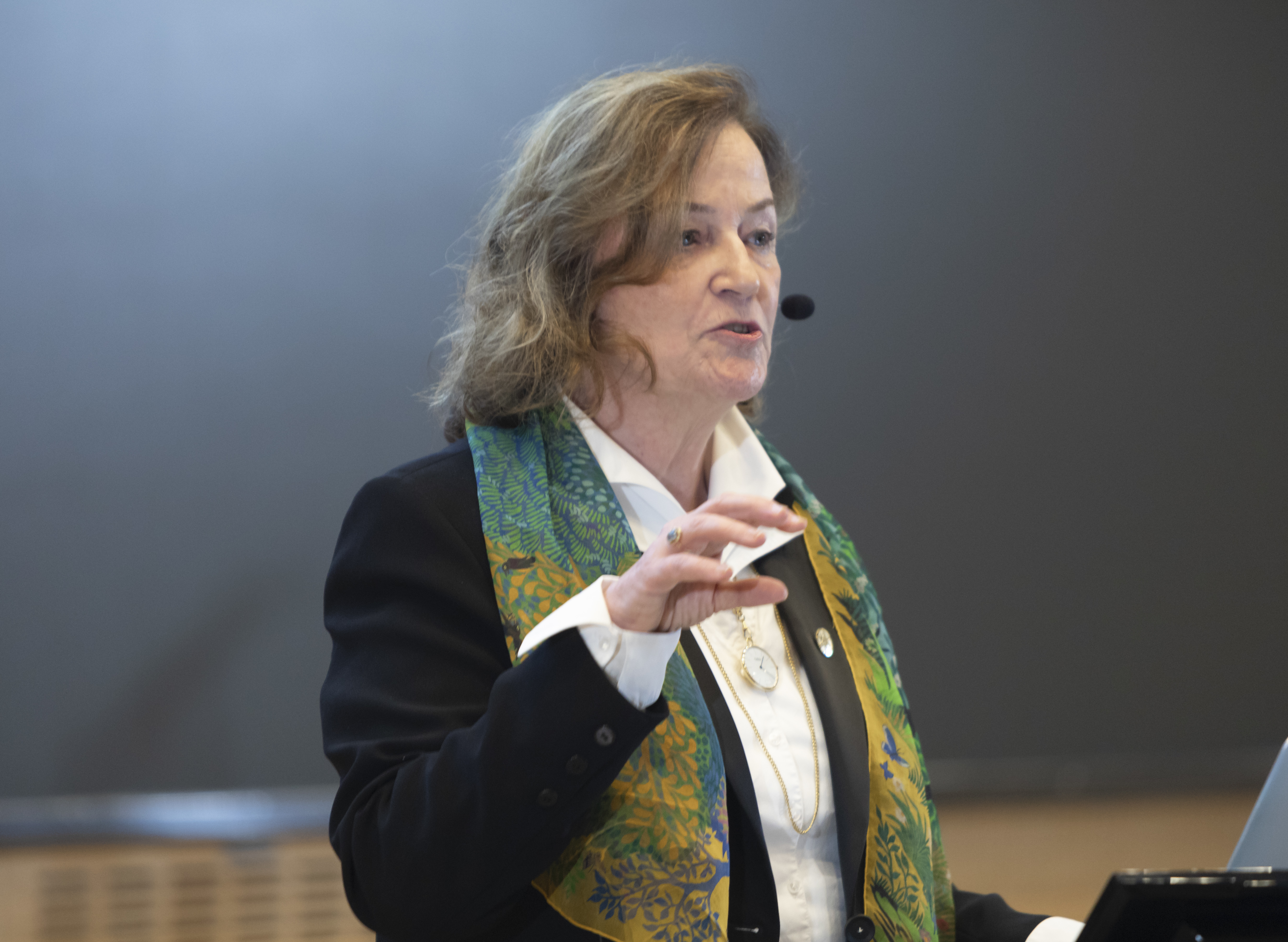
- Born: 4 February 1948 (age 78); Laignes, France
- Occupation: Geneticist
- Employer(s): Collège de France and the Pasteur Institute
- Title: Professor
- Awards: Louis-Jeantet Prize for Medicine (2006); The Brain Prize (2012); Kavli Prize in Neuroscience (2018); Association for Research in Otolaryngology Award of Merit (2018); Louisa Gross Horwitz Prize (2020); Gruber Prize in Neuroscience (2021)

Christine Petit (born 4 February 1948) is a French geneticist. She holds professorships at the Collège de France and the Pasteur Institute.

== Biography ==
Petit was born in Laignes in 1948. She initially studied at the Paris teaching hospital, Pitié-Salpêtrière Hospital and at the Pasteur Institute. She completed two pieces of post-doctoral research at the Centre for Molecular Research in Gif-sur-Yvette and another in Basel.

Petit holds professorships at Collège de France and the Pasteur Institute. She has a member of the Academy of Science since 14 January 2002.

Petit's research has explored the link between genes and deafness, with her research group at INSERM "Génétique et physiologie de l’audition". She is one of the pioneers of auditory genetics.

Together with Karen Steel, Petit won the Brain Prize in 2012, for their pioneering work on the genetics of hearing and deafness.

== Prizes and honours ==
- 1999 : Prix Charles-Leopold Mayer of the Academy of Sciences
- 2004 : L'Oréal-UNESCO For Women in Science
- 2006 : Louis-Jeantet Prize for Medicine
- 2007 : Grand Prix of Medical Research INSERM
- 2012 : Co-recipient with Karen Steel of The Brain Prize from the Lundbeck Foundation
- 2016 : Foreign associate of the National Academy of Sciences
- Knight of the Legion of Honour
- Officer of the National Order of Merit
- 2018 : Kavli Prize in Neuroscience (shared with James Hudspeth and Robert Fettiplace)
- 2018 : Association for Research in Otolaryngology Award of Merit
- 2020 : Louisa Gross Horwitz Prize(Columbia University) (shared with James Hudspeth and Robert Fettiplace).
- 2021 : Gruber Prize in Neuroscience (shared with Christopher A. Walsh).
