= List of fellows of the Royal Society elected in 1990 =

Fellows of the Royal Society, elected in 1990.

== Fellows ==
1. Roger Angel
2. Michael Ashburner
3. David Bohm (1917–1992)
4. David Brown
5. Malcolm H. Chisholm
6. Robin Clark
7. Peter Clarricoats
8. John G. Collier (1935–1995)
9. Simon Conway Morris
10. Andrew Crawford
11. Leslie Dutton
12. Robert Fettiplace
13. Erwin Gabathuler
14. Nicholas C. Handy (1941–2012)
15. Allen Hill (1937–2021)
16. Jonathan Hodgkin
17. Eric Jakeman
18. George Jellicoe, 2nd Earl Jellicoe (1918–2007)
19. Dame Louise Johnson (1940–2012)
20. Vaughan Jones
21. Dame Carole Jordan
22. John Knott
23. Sir Harry Kroto
24. Steven V. Ley
25. Lew Mander
26. Michael E. McIntyre
27. Derek W. Moore (1931–2008)
28. Colin James Pennycuick
29. John Albert Raven
30. Sir David Read
31. Man Mohan Sharma
32. Allan Snyder
33. George Stark
34. Azim Surani
35. Bob Vaughan
36. Herman Waldmann
37. William Lionel Wilkinson
38. Alan Williams (1945–1992)
39. Robin Williams
40. Sir Greg Winter
41. Semir Zeki

== Foreign members ==
1. Edward Norton Lorenz (1917–2008)
2. Yasutomi Nishizuka (1932–2004)
3. Christiane Nusslein-Volhard
4. Bengt I. Samuelsson
5. Lyman Spitzer (1914–1997)
6. E. O. Wilson
