= Robert Fettiplace =

British neuroscientist

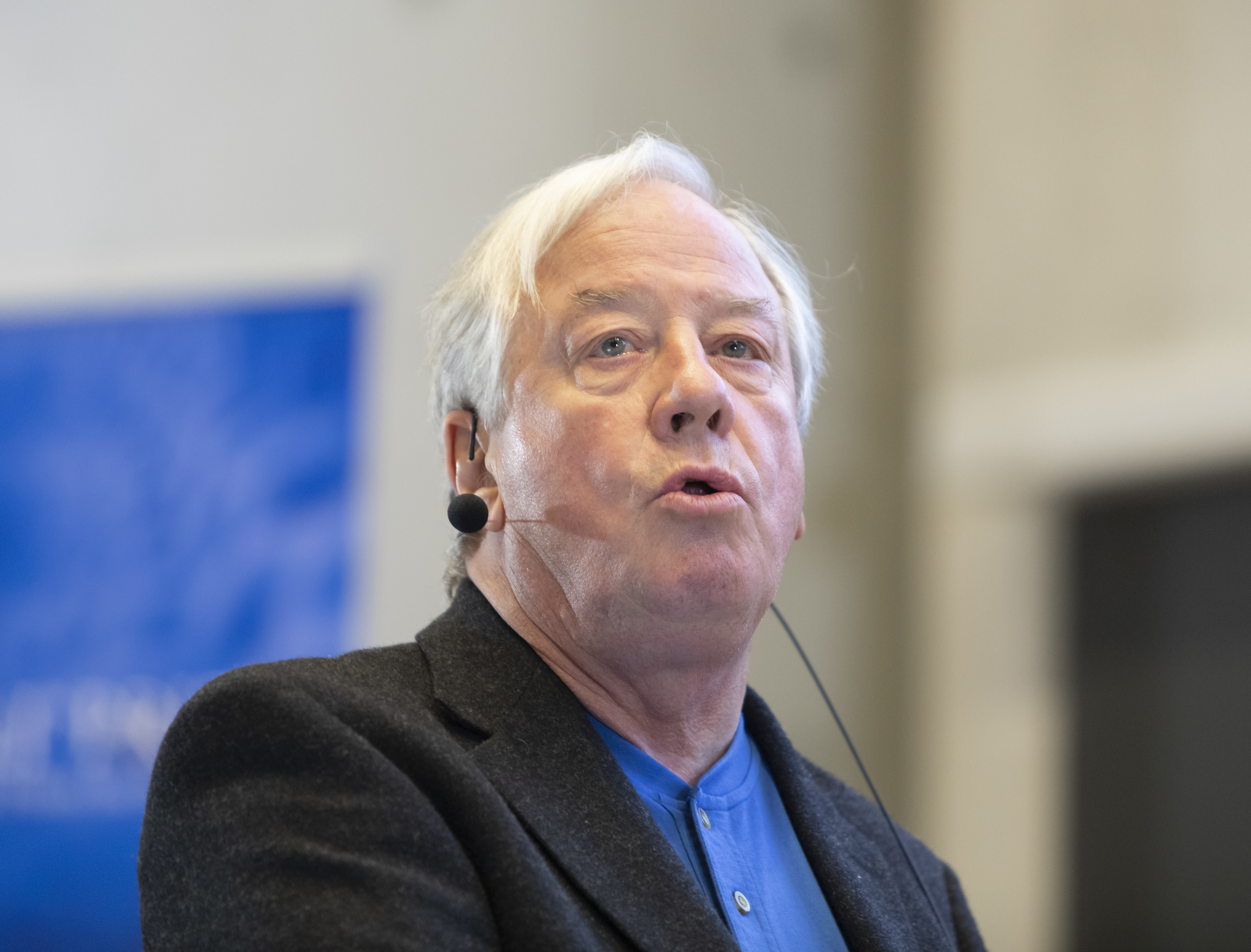
- Born: Nottingham, England
- Education: Cambridge University
- Awards: Louisa Gross Horwitz Prize (2020); Kavli Prize in Neuroscience (2018); Association for Research in Otolaryngology Award of Merit (2006)
- Scientific career
- Fields: Neurobiology
- Workplaces: University of Wisconsin–Madison

Robert Fettiplace is a British neuroscientist who is Steenbock Professor of Neural and Behavioral Sciences, at the University of Wisconsin–Madison.

== Work ==
Fettiplace studied the mechanism of hearing in vertebrates. In 1976, he and Andrew Crawford developed a method of recording the electrical responses of hair cells in the isolated cochlea of reptiles. These experiments, which were the first to give extensive quantitative records from auditory receptors, showed that each hair cell is sharply tuned to a characteristic frequency and that much of the frequency selectivity in the turtle’s ear can be attributed to electrical resonance in the hair cell membrane.

Later work proved that the resonant frequency was set by the density and kinetics of potassium channels, the frequency increasing with a greater number of faster channels. At least three classes of potassium channels are needed to cover the range of hearing: voltage- and calcium-activated (BK) channels, voltage-gated (Kv) channels, and inwardly rectifying channels. These channels work together with voltage-gated calcium channels to generate electrical resonance, a conclusion that was supported by mathematical reconstruction and simulations. This mechanism is present in all vertebrate classes except mammals.

Another important development was the use of new methods of imaging hair cell stereociliary bundles and delivering force stimuli, providing the first demonstration of sub-micron active oscillations of the bundles. His subsequent work has focused on determining the properties, location and identity of the mechanically sensitive ion channels that transduce sound stimuli into electrical signals.

== Awards and honours ==
Fettiplace was elected a Fellow of the Royal Society (FRS) in 1990. He was also elected a Fellow of American Academy of Arts and Sciences in 2012. In 2018, Dr. Fettiplace shared the Kavli Prize in Neuroscience with A. James Hudspeth and Christine Petit and in 2020 also the Louisa Gross Horwitz Prize(Columbia University).
