= A. James Hudspeth =

American neuroscience academic (1945–2025)

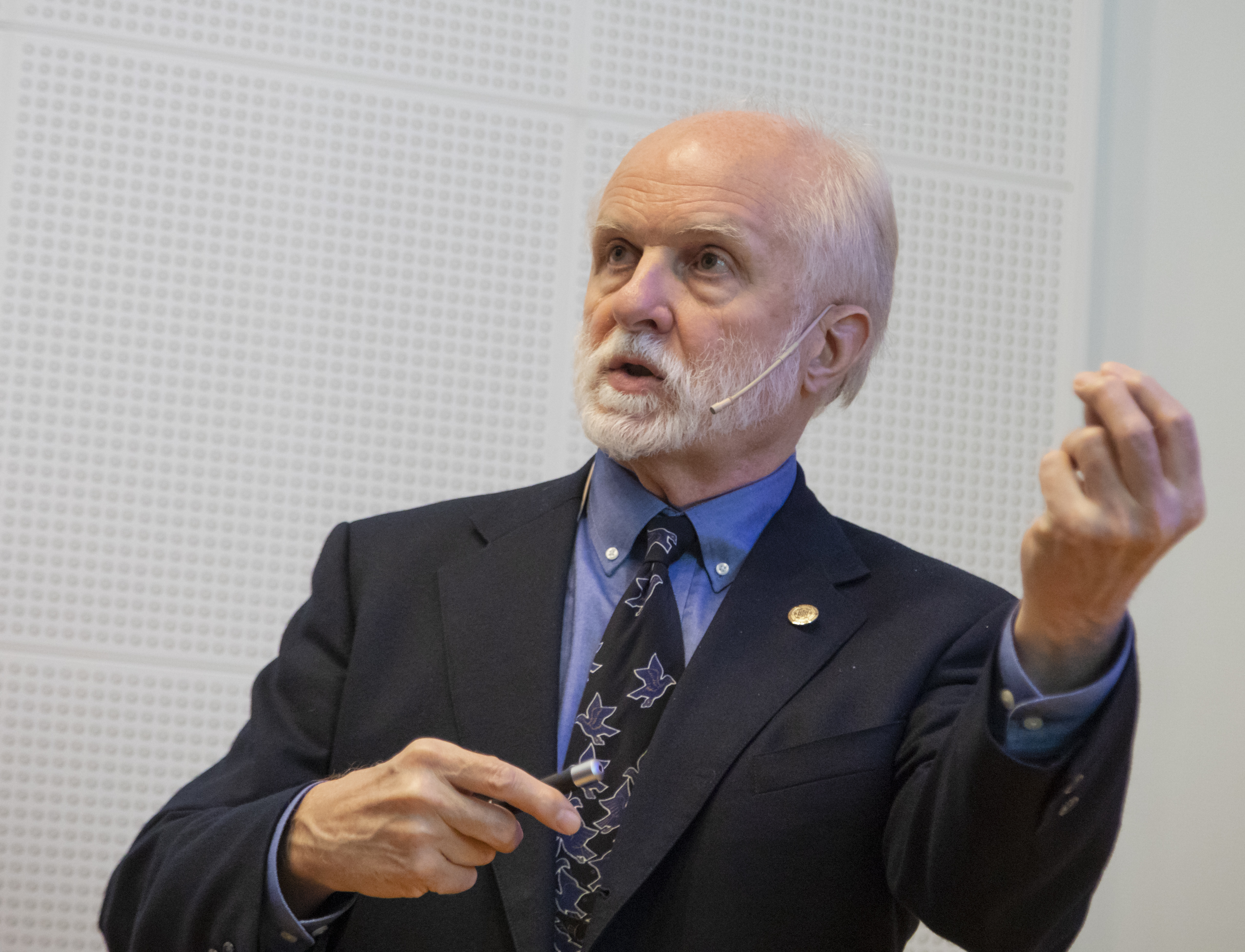
- Born: November 9, 1945; Houston, Texas, U.S.
- Died: August 16, 2025 (aged 79); New York City, U.S.
- Education: Harvard University
- Awards: Louisa Gross Horwitz Prize (2020); Kavli Prize in Neuroscience (2018); Association for Research in Otolaryngology Award of Merit (2002); W. Alden Spencer Award in Neuroscience (1985)
- Scientific career
- Workplaces: Caltech; UC San Francisco; UT Southwestern; Rockefeller University

Albert James Hudspeth (November 9, 1945 – August 16, 2025) was an American academic who was the F.M. Kirby Professor at Rockefeller University in New York City, where he was director of the F.M. Kirby Center for Sensory Neuroscience. His laboratory studied the physiological basis of hearing.

== Early life and education ==
Hudspeth was born on November 9, 1945, in Houston, Texas, to Chalmers Hudspeth, a lawyer, and DeMaris Hudspeth, née De Lange, who ran the home. As a teenager, James Hudspeth spent his summers working as a technician in the lab of neurophysiologist Peter Kellaway at Baylor College of Medicine. Hudspeth was expelled from high school for mixing dangerous chemicals and other mischief, but was readmitted.

Hudspeth graduated from Harvard College in 1967, and received his master's degree from Harvard University in 1968. He enrolled in a graduate program in neurobiology to avoid being drafted into the military, but a year later the policy was changed, requiring him to enter medical school for exemption. He studied under Nobel prize winners Torsten Wiesel and David Hubel. He completed both programs and received his PhD in 1973 and MD in 1974, both from Harvard University.

He began a postdoctoral fellowship with Åke Flock at the Karolinska Institute, but returned soon afterwards to Harvard Medical School.

== Career ==
Following his postdoctoral training, Hudspeth was a professor at Caltech from 1975 to 1983. He then moved to the UCSF School of Medicine where he was a professor from 1983 to 1989. He directed the neuroscience program at University of Texas Southwestern Medical Center from 1989 until 1995, when the department was closed. In 1995, he was recruited to the Rockefeller University.

Hudspeth was an HHMI investigator from 1993.

=== Research ===
Hudspeth's research is focused on sensorineural hearing loss, and the deterioration of the hair cells, the sensory cells of the cochlea. Hudspeth's bold interpretation of the data obtained in his careful experimental research combined with biophysical modelling led him to propose for the first time that the sense of hearing depends on a channel that is opened by mechanical force: The hair cells located in the inner ear perceive sound when their apical end -consisting of a bundle of filaments- bends in response to the movement caused by this sound. The activated hair cell rapidly fills with calcium entering from the outside of the cell, which in turn activates the release of neurotransmitters that start a signal to the brain. Hudspeth proposed the existence of a "gating spring" opened by direct mechanical force that would open a hypothetical channel responsible for the entry of calcium ions. The hypothesis was based on the following evidence: 1) Part of the energy needed to bend the filament bundle was mysteriously lost, but could be explained if it was used to opening this gating spring, 2) The entry of calcium ions was microseconds long, this is so fast that only direct opening -without a cascade of chemical reactions- could account for it and 3) Hudspeth tested a model analogue to the opening of a door with a string attached to the door knob and demonstrated that a similar process was taking place when the filaments of the hair cell moved. Furthermore, microscopic evidence showed the existence of such a string-like structure tethering the tip of one filament to the side of and adjacent filament that could be the elusive gating spring; this string—called the tip link—would tense if the filament bundle was bent and then open the channel. Although the precise identity of the proteins forming the tip link and the mechanosensitive channel is still controversial 30 years later. Hudspeth's hypothesis was correct and fundamental for the understanding of the sense of hearing.

== Tuned hair cells also in mammals ==
In his last publication Hudspeth and his research team – based on "a groundbreaking technological advancement" – ultimately established that also in mammals frequency analysis in the inner ear is accomplished by tuned hairs cells. This process occurs without a traveling wave (surface wave) on the basilar membrane, and the inner ear theory of Georg von Békésy was thus disproved. Instead, this new finding is fully compatible with a function of the traveling wave as an overload protection of the cochlea by absorption of excessive sound input.

== Death ==
Hudspeth died of brain cancer on August 16, 2025, in Manhattan, at the age of 79.

== Noted publications ==
- Holton T & A.J. Hudspeth A Micromechanical contribution to cochlear tuning and tonotopic organization. Science (1983); 222 (4623): 508–510
- D.P. Corey, A.J. Hudspeth Kinetics of the receptor current in bullfrog saccular hair cells. J. Neurosci., 3 (1983): 962-976
- Rosenblatt KP, Sun ZP, Heller S, A.J. Hudspeth Distribution of Ca2+-activated K+ channel isoforms along the tonotopic gradient of the chicken's cochlea. Neuron (1997): 19(5): 1061–1075 (note: this research was continued several years later taking advantage of newly available technology)
- A.J. Hudspeth How hearing happens. NEURON (1997): 19(5): 947-950
- Lopez-Schier H, Starr CJ, Kappler JA, Kollmar R, A.J. Hudspeth Directional cell migration establishes the axes of planar polarity in the posterior lateral-line organ of the zebrafish. Dev CELL (2004): 7(3):401–412
- Chan DK, A.J. Hudspeth Ca2+ current-driven nonlinear amplification by the mammalian cochlea in vitro. Nature Neuro (2005): 8(2):149–155
- Kozlov AS, Risler T, A.J. Hudspeth Coherent motion of stereocilia assures the concerted gating of hair-cell transduction channels. Nature Neuro (2007): 10(1):87–92
- Kozlov AS, Baumgart J, Risler T, Versteegh CP, A.J. Hudspeth Forces between clustered stereocilia minimize friction in the ear on a subnanometre scale. Nature. (2011): 474 (7351):376–9
- Fisher JA, Nin F, Reichenbach T, Uthaiah RC, A.J. Hudspeth The spatial pattern of cochlear amplification Neuron (2012): 76(5):989–9

== Awards ==
- 1985 W. Alden Spencer Award(Columbia University)
- 1991 K.S. Cole Award, Biophysical Society
- 1994 Charles A. Dana Award
- 1996 Rosenstiel Award
- 2002 Award of Merit, Association for Research in Otolaryngology
- 2003 Ralph W. Gerard Prize, Society for Neuroscience
- 2010 Guyot Prize, University of Groningen
- Elected member of the National Academy of Sciences and the American Academy of Arts and Sciences
- 2015 Elected member of the American Philosophical Society
- 2018 Kavli Prize in Neuroscience (shared with Christine Petit and Robert Fettiplace) as well as fellowship in the Norwegian Academy of Science and Letters.
- 2020 Louisa Gross Horwitz Prize(Columbia University) (shared with Christine Petit and Robert Fettiplace).
