= Louis Jean-Marie Daubenton =

18th century French naturalist

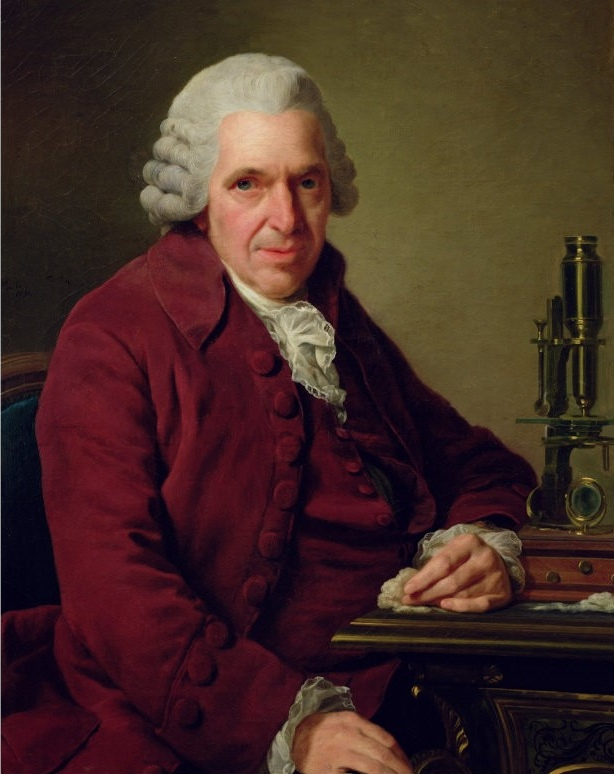
- Daubenton in 1791
- Born: 29 May 1716; Montbard, Côte-d'Or, Kingdom of France
- Died: 1 January 1800 (aged 83); Paris, France
- Scientific career
- Fields: naturalist

Signature
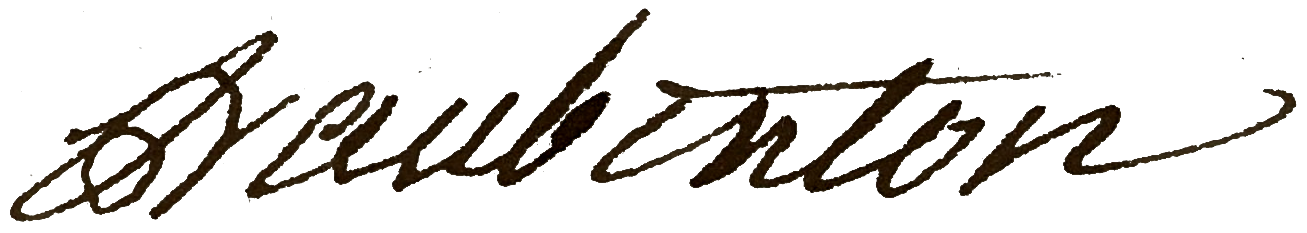

Louis Jean-Marie Daubenton (French pronunciation: [lwi ʒɑ̃ maʁi dobɑ̃tɔ̃]; 29 May 1716 – 1 January 1800) was a French naturalist and contributor to the Encyclopédie ou Dictionnaire raisonné des sciences, des arts et des métiers.

== Biography ==
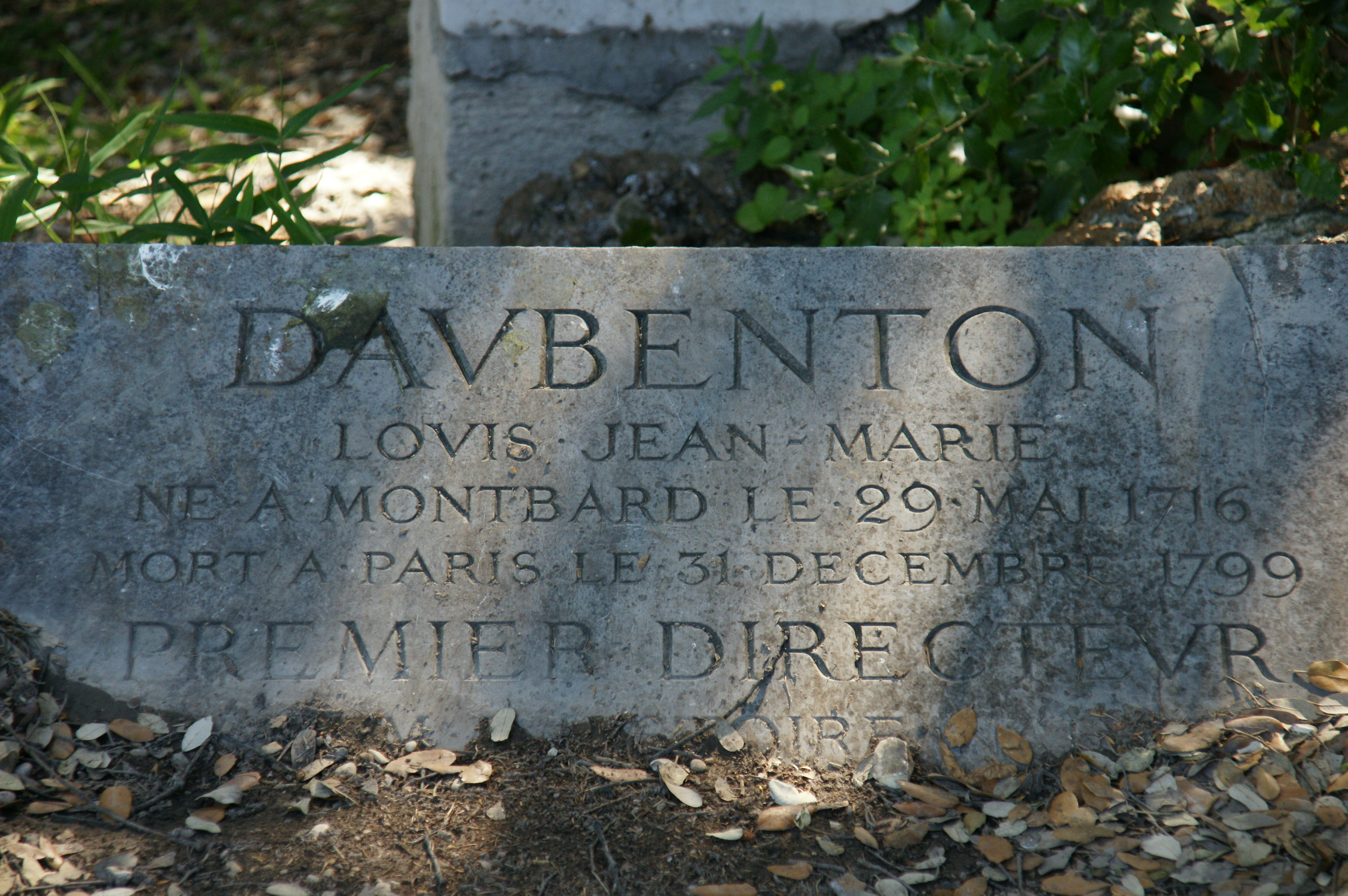
Daubenton's grave in the gardens of the Museum of Natural History

Daubenton was born at Montbard, Côte-d'Or. His father, Jean Daubenton, a notary, intended him for the church, and sent him to Paris to study theology, but Louis-Jean-Marie was more interested in medicine. Jean's death in 1736 set his son free to choose his own career, and in 1741 he graduated in medicine at Reims and returned to his hometown, planning to practice as a physician. At about this time, Georges-Louis Leclerc de Buffon, also a native of Montbard, was preparing to bring out a multi-volume work on natural history, the Histoire naturelle, générale et particulière, and in 1742 he invited Daubenton to assist him by providing anatomical descriptions. In many respects, the two men were complete opposites, but they worked well in partnership. In 1744, Daubenton became a member of the French Academy of Sciences as an adjunct botanist, and Buffon appointed him keeper and demonstrator of the king's cabinet in the Jardin du Roi.

In the first section of the Histoire naturelle, Daubenton gave descriptions and details of the dissection of 182 species of quadrupeds, thus securing himself a high reputation as a comparative anatomist. Concerned about the readability and profitability of the Histoire naturelle, Buffon dropped Daubenton's anatomical descriptions from later editions as well as from the series on birds, but Daubenton continued to work closely with Buffon at the Jardin du Roi.

Daubenton published many articles in the memoirs of the Parisian Académie Royale des Sciences, presenting his research on animals, the comparative anatomy of extant and fossil animals, vegetable physiology, mineralogy, agriculture, and the merino sheep that he successfully introduced into France. He was elected as a member of the American Philosophical Society in 1775. From 1775 onwards, Daubenton lectured on natural history in the College of Medicine, and in 1783 on rural economy at the Alfort school. He was also professor of mineralogy at the Jardin du Roi. As a lecturer he was in high repute, and to the last retained his popularity. In December 1799 he was appointed a member of the senate, but at the first meeting which he attended he fell from his seat in an apoplectic fit and, after a short illness, died at Paris. He was married but the couple had no children. His wife, Marguerite Daubenton (1720-1818), was a novelist and the author of Zelie dans le Desert (1786).

Daubenton's name is commemorated in several species names, most notably the lemur the aye-aye (Daubentonia madagascariensis), Daubenton's bat (Myotis daubentoni) and a kale known as Daubenton's kale.

== Relatives ==
He is not to be confused with his cousin Edmé-Louis Daubenton, who was also a naturalist.

== See also ==
- Society of the Friends of Truth
