= Association for Research in Otolaryngology =

Research association for the study of Otolaryngology

The Association for Research in Otolaryngology (ARO) is a professional association of researchers, including practitioners, teachers, and students, in the fields of otolaryngology (ear, nose, and throat), and especially including hearing. The association was founded in 1973.

David J. Lim, M.D. was one of the founding members of the ARO and served as one of the first scientific directors of National Institute on Deafness and Other Communication Disorders (NIDCD) from 1991 to 1995. The NIDCD is an important channel partner of the ARO.

The Association annually recognizes an individual who has made substantial scientific achievements in and contributions to the fields encompassed by otolaryngology through its Award of Merit selection. Awardees have included A. James Hudspeth (2002), Edwin Rubel (2005), Robert Fettiplace (2006), Karen Steel (2013), and Christine Petit (2018).

== Journal ==
JARO (the Journal of the Association for Research in Otolaryngology) is an online-first peer-reviewed journal published by the ARO through Springer.
