= Andrew Crawford (neuroscientist) =

British neuroscientist

- Born: Andrew Charles Crawford; 12 January 1949 (age 76)
- Awards: FRS (1990)
- Scientific career
- Fields: Cellular neuroscience; Molecular neuroscience; Computational neuroscience
- Thesis: The relationship between spontaneous and evoked release of transmitter substances (1974)
- Website: www.neuroscience.cam.ac.uk/directory/profile.php?ac151

Andrew Charles Crawford (born 1949) FRS is a British neuroscientist. He is a professor at the Department of Physiology, Development and Neuroscience of the University of Cambridge and a Fellow of Trinity College.

== Education ==
Crawford was educated at King Edward VI Camp Hill School for Boys in Birmingham and Downing College, Cambridge, where he was awarded a Bachelor of Arts degree in 1970. He moved to Emmanuel College, Cambridge, and was awarded his PhD in 1974.

== Research ==
Crawford is known for his studies of the mechanism of hearing in vertebrates. In 1976, he and Robert Fettiplace developed a method of recording the electrical responses of hair cells in the isolated cochlea of reptiles. He has also published a series of important papers on neuromuscular transmission in frogs and crabs.

== Awards and honours ==
Crawford was elected a Fellow of the Royal Society (FRS) in 1990.
