= Eric Jakeman =

British mathematical physicist

Eric Jakeman FRS
- Born: 1939 (age 86–87)
- Education: University of Birmingham
- Awards: FRS (1990); Maxwell Medal (1977)
- Scientific career
- Fields: Mathematical physics
- Workplaces: Imperial College London.; University of Nottingham; Defence Research Agency

Eric Jakeman (born 1939) is a British mathematical physicist specialising in the statistics and quantum statistics of waves. He is an emeritus professor at the University of Nottingham.

== Education ==
Jakeman was educated at The Brunts School in Mansfield, England. He received a degree in mathematical physics from Birmingham University in 1960, and a PhD in superconductivity theory in 1963.

== Career ==
He was the head of the scattering and quantum optics section at the Defence Research Agency, a visiting professor at Imperial College London, an honorary secretary of the Institute of Physics from 1994 until 2003, and finally a Professor of Applied Statistical Optics at the University of Nottingham from 1996. He was a member of the Council of the European Physical Society from 1985 until 2003.

== Awards and honours ==
In 1977, Jakeman received the Maxwell Medal of the Institute of Physics for his work on statistical optics. He was elected a Fellow of the Royal Society (FRS) in 1990. His certificate of election reads:

Dr Jakeman is an internationally recognised expert in the statistics and quantum statistics of wave fields, particularly those arising in laser scattering. His theoretical work on photon statistics and speckle has made a unique contribution to the development of the technique of photon correlation spectroscopy which is now used to investigate structure and motion in a wide range of systems of importance in engineering, medicine, physics, chemistry and biology. He has also significantly advanced the subject of non-Gaussian scattering of waves by random media and has developed new noise models which are being widely applied in optical, microwave and acoustic scattering problems. Jakeman has also made contributions to the field of heat and mass transfer, particularly on the subjects of morphological stability and oscillatory convection in crystal growth, and was jointly responsible for the notion of doubly-diffusive convection driven by the Soret Effect.
