= André Osterberger =

French hammer thrower

Personal information
- Nationality: French
- Born: 26 October 1920 Laignes, France
- Died: 18 January 2009 (aged 88)

Sport
- Sport: Athletics
- Event: Hammer throw

André Osterberger (26 October 1920 – 18 January 2009) was a French athlete. He competed in the men's hammer throw at the 1952 Summer Olympics.
