= Mir-96 microRNA =

microRNA mir-96
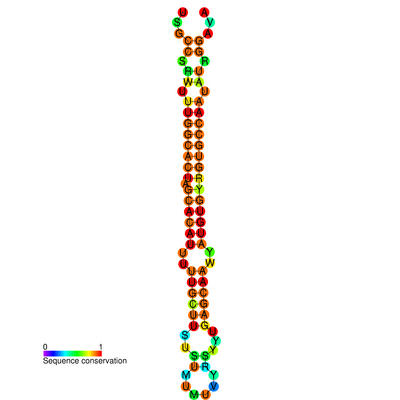
- Predicted secondary structure and sequence conservation of mir-96

Identifiers
- Symbol: mir-96
- Alt. Symbols: MIR96
- Rfam: RF00669
- miRBase: MI0000098
- miRBase family: MIPF0000072

Other data
- RNA type: Gene; miRNA
- Domain: Eukaryota
- GO: GO:0035068 GO:0035195
- SO: SO:0001244
- PDB structures: PDBe

miR-96 microRNA precursor is a small non-coding RNA that regulates gene expression. microRNAs are transcribed as ~80 nucleotide precursors and subsequently processed by the Dicer enzyme to give a ~23 nucleotide products. In this case the mature sequence comes from the 5′ arm of the precursor. The mature products are thought to have regulatory roles through complementarity to mRNA.

miR-96 is thought to be conserved within Nephrozoa, i.e. the Deuterostomes and Protostomes.

Variation within the seed region of mature miR-96 has been associated with autosomal dominant, progressive hearing loss in humans and mice. The homozygous mutant mice were profoundly deaf, showing no cochlear responses. Heterozygous mice and humans progressively lose the ability to hear. Five genes, of 132 predicted targets, have been experimentally validated as targets of miR-96: Aqp5, Celsr2, Myrip, Odf2 and Ryk.

Microarray analysis of 4-day old wildtype and mutant mice showed that in the 3′ UTR of upregulated genes, there was a significant enrichment in heptamers complementary to miR-96, implying that miR-96 normally affects a wide range of target genes, and that the mutation results in a loss of normal targets. Among the downregulated genes, there is a significant enrichment in heptamers complementary to the mutant miR-96, so the mutant miR-96 has gained novel targets. Among the downregulated genes were five of particular interest; Ocm, Pitpnm1, Prestin, Ptprq and Gfi1, all of which are strongly and specifically expressed in hair cells. Mice mutant for the latter three exhibit deafness and hair cell degeneration.

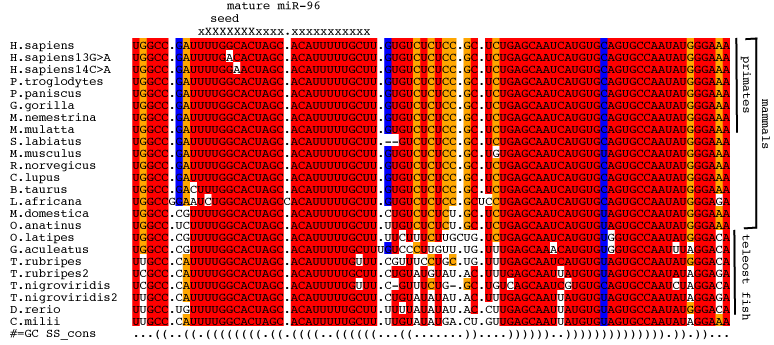
A multiple sequence alignment of precursor miR-96 molecules. Highly conserved nucleotides are coloured in red, less well conserved nucleotides are coloured orange and non-conserved nucleotides are coloured blue or white. The columns corresponding to the mature and seed sequence are indicated above the alignment. The canonical human sequence and the two human variant sequences that are implicated in hearing loss (13G>A and 14C>A) are in the first, second and third rows respectively.

== Media reports ==
- Sanger press release
- New Insights Into Progressive Hearing Loss
