= Montbard station =

Railway station in Montbard, France

Montbard
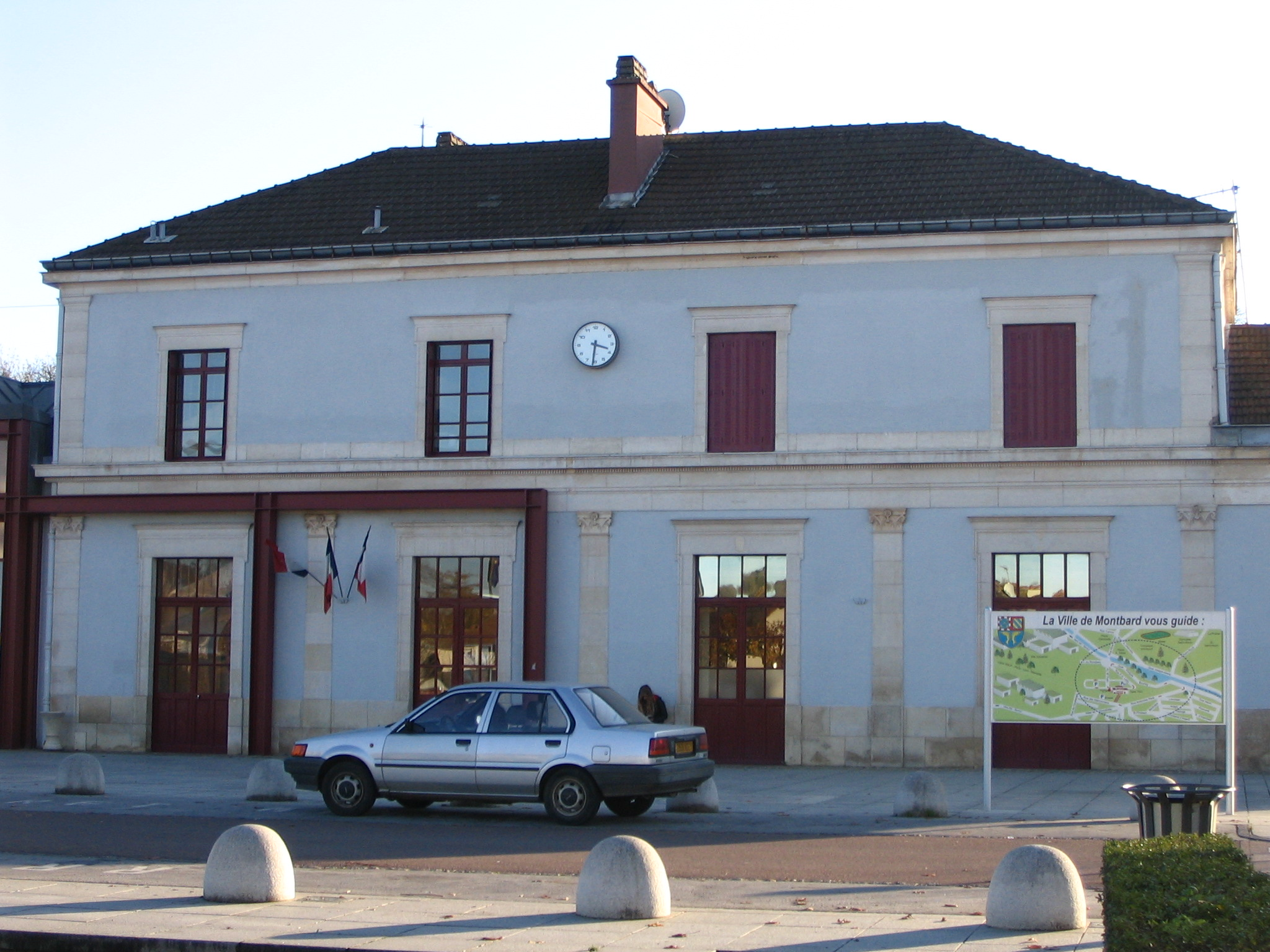
- Montbard railway station

General information
- Location: Montbard, Côte-d'Or, Bourgogne-Franche-Comté, France
- Coordinates: 47°37′06″N 4°20′10″E
- Line: Paris–Marseille railway

Other information
- Station code: 87713131

History
- Opened: 16 September 1867

Services
Preceding station	SNCF	Following station
Paris-Lyon Terminus	TGV inOui	Dijon-Ville towards Besançon-Viotte
Paris-Lyon Terminus	TGV inOui	Dijon-Ville towards Mulhouse-Ville
Preceding station	TER Bourgogne-Franche-Comté	Following station
Nuits-sous-Ravières towards Paris-Bercy	TER	Les Laumes-Alésia towards Dijon
Nuits-sous-Ravières towards Auxerre	TER	Les Laumes-Alésia towards Dijon
Location

Montbard is a railway station located in Montbard, Côte-d'Or, France. The station was opened on 16 September 1867 and is located on the Paris–Marseille railway. The train services are operated by SNCF.

== Train services ==
The following train services serve the station as of 2022:

- High speed services (TGV) Paris - Dijon - Besançon (- Mulhouse)
- High speed services (TGV) Paris - Dijon - Chalon-sur-Saône
- High speed services (TGV) Lille - Charles de Gaulle Airport - Dijon - Mulhouse
- Regional services (TER Bourgogne) Paris - Sens - Laroche-Migennes - Montbard - Dijon (- Lyon)
- Regional services (TER Bourgogne) Auxerre - Laroche-Migennes - Montbard - Dijon
