= Edwin Rubel =

American academic and developmental neurobiologist

- Born: Edwin W Rubel; May 8, 1942 (age 84); Chicago, IL
- Education: Michigan State University (BS, MS, PhD)
- Awards: Fellow, AAAS, 1990; Award of Merit, Association for Research in Otolaryngology, 2005
- Scientific career
- Workplaces: Yale; University of Virginia; University of Washington

Edwin Rubel is an American academic and developmental neurobiologist holding the position of emeritus professor at the University of Washington. He was the founding director and first Virginia Merrill Bloedel Chair in Basic Hearing Research from 1989 to 2017.

== Education ==
Rubel completed his undergraduate and graduate education at Michigan State University. He received his MA in psychology in 1967 for the thesis "Imprinting in the Quail, Coturnix coturnix". He received his PhD in psychology in 1969 for his thesis entitled "A comparison of somatotopic organization in sensory neocortex of newborn kittens and adult cats", published in The Journal of Comparative Neurology in 1971. His PhD advisors were John I. Johnson. and Glen I. Hatton.

== Scientific career ==
Rubel's research is on methods and preparations to better understand the development, plasticity, pathology and potential repair of the inner ear and auditory pathways of the brain, and has published over 300 papers. He has made contributions to several different areas of auditory neuroscience. These include studies of the development and plasticity of neurons in the auditory brainstem, damage and regeneration of hair cells and protection of the mechanosensory cells in the inner ear for hearing and balance.

Auditory brainstem

Rubel and colleagues made considerable contributions to the study of the auditory brainstem, describing the anatomy, organization, development and plasticity of these structures in birds and mammals. Studies included descriptions of the tonotopic organization of brainstem nuclei in chick, leading to identification of neural circuitry underlying interaural time differences. His group also studied the effects of cochlear removal on brainstem organization in chick and in gerbil, demonstrating a critical period for cochlear influences.

Hair cell regeneration

Rubel and colleagues demonstrated that hair cell regeneration occurred in birds after exposure to aminoglycoside antibiotics or acoustic trauma, paralleling studies by Cotanche and Corwin and Cotanche. Prior to these studies it was generally believed that hair cell regeneration did not occur in warm-blooded animals.

Hair cell damage and prevention of hearing loss

With colleagues at the University of Washington and Fred Hutchinson Cancer Research Center, Rubel develop the zebrafish as a model system for understanding hair cell damage and regeneration. Studies identified mutations that altered susceptibility to ototoxic agents, and small molecule screens for compounds that prevent hair cell damage. Through iterative chemistry, they developed a lead compound with improved otoprotective potency, improved pharmacokinetic properties and reduced off-target activity (ORC-13661). This compound has been licensed to Oricula Therapeutics, co-founded by Rubel, and has been approved for use in humans by the FDA.

== Service, honors and awards ==
Rubel served on the advisory council of the National Institute on Deafness and Communication Disorders from 1991 to 1995. He became a Fellow of the American Association for the Advancement of Science in 1999. Rubel served as president of the Association for Research in Otolaryngology (ARO) in 1999, and was awarded the Award of Merit from the ARO in 2005. He has served on the editorial boards of a number of journals, including Hearing Research, The Journal of Neuroscience and The Journal of Comparative Neurology.
