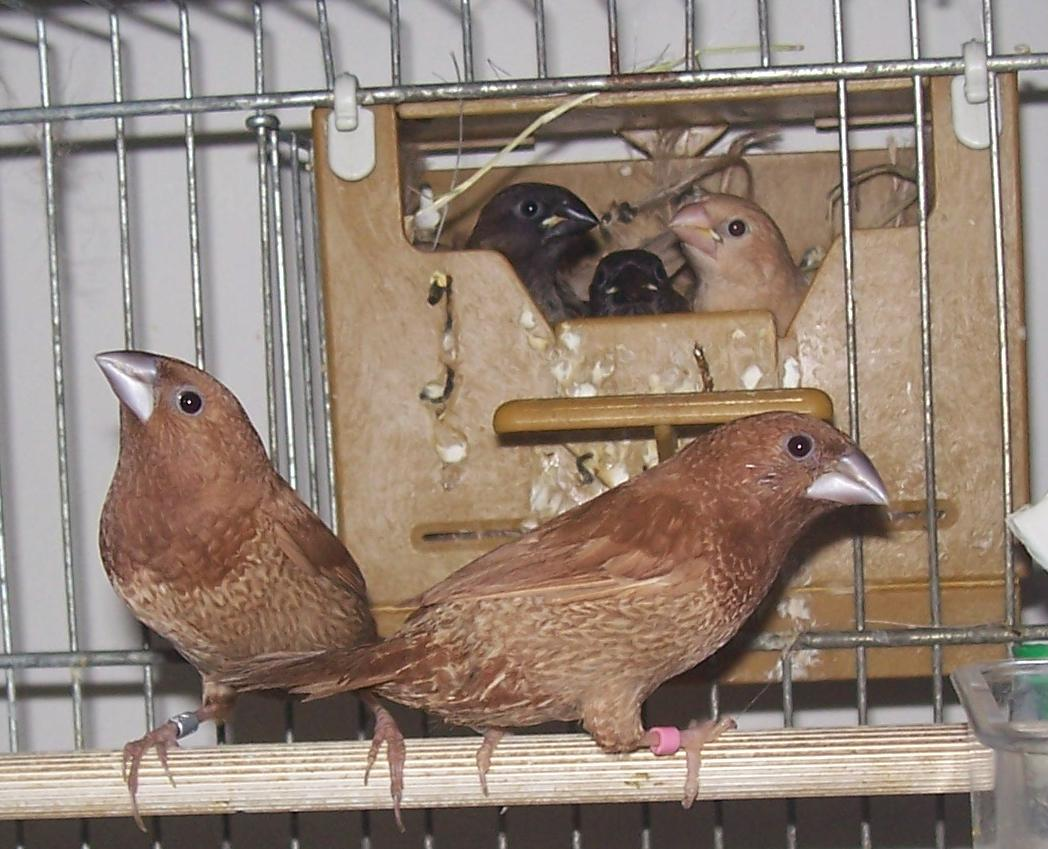

Conservation status
- Domesticated

Scientific classification
- Kingdom: Animalia
- Phylum: Chordata
- Class: Aves
- Order: Passeriformes
- Family: Estrildidae
- Genus: Lonchura
- Species: L. striata
- Subspecies: L. s. domestica

Trinomial name
- Lonchura striata domestica Linnaeus, 1758

= Society finch =

Subspecies of bird

The Society finch (Lonchura striata domestica), also known as the Bengali finch or Bengalese finch, is a domesticated subspecies of estrildid finch. It became a popular cage and trade bird after appearing in European zoos in the 1860s through being imported from Japan, though it was domesticated in China. Coloration and behavior were modified through centuries of selection in Asia, then later in Europe and North America.

Another aspect of the Bengali finch that evolved throughout the centuries is song production. Extensive research has been done and continues to be done on the different ways Bengali finch songs are produced, how they are processed in the brain, what characteristics of the songs are preferred by females, and how their songs compare to the also commonly studied zebra finch.

== Evolution and origin ==
Although the English language literature on aviculture called these birds as Bengali finch, the German aviculturist Karl Russ called them in 1871 as Japanese mövchen (or mew, an old word for gull, possibly related to Chinese mövchen, a pigeon breed named in France and introduced to Germany around the same time for their resemblance to gulls). The birds are members of the estrildid finch family and most authorities consider them a domestic form of the white-rumped munia (known in aviculture as the striated finch) most likely derived from the subspecies Lonchura striata swinhoei although some have suggested a hybrid origin.

== Behavior ==
In a cage, in Japan. (video)

Bengali finches are well adapted to captivity and the company of humans. They breed well and are good foster parents for other finch-like birds.

While two males may not get along without other company, it has been found the best "pairing" for fostering is to use two males, this works better than either two females or a male and female pairing. Two males will usually accept eggs or even partly grown young without any hesitation.

These birds like to be close together and tend to all roost in one nest if kept in a group. In an aviary they lay eggs and crowd into a single nest, interfering with incubation (which is performed by the female and lasts 16 days) or damaging the eggs. Thus they breed better if kept as single pairs in individual breeding boxes. This sociability is also responsible for their American name of "society finch."

Bengali finches are quite easy to look after. They are also quite easy to breed provided they are properly sexed. Obtaining a female-male pair can present a difficulty because both sexes look similar. However, it is possible to determine gender by behavior since males tend to display to females. One method to sex a Bengali finch is to place one bird in a small cage completely isolated it from its own kind (both sight and hearing) and then introduce another Bengali to the cage after several hours. If the first bird is a male, it will immediately display to the newcomer. However, this does not necessarily mean the introduced bird is a female, but if the first bird does not display then it is almost certainly female. Society finches can be housed with other finches including other societies, Zebra finches, Gouldian finches, and Spice finches.

== Diet ==
They are generally given a diet of seeds, such as millets and canary seed, and greens. They will not usually take live-foods, but it has been found they will often accept housefly pupae, which they crack like seeds. This is particularly useful if they are being used to foster species that require a high protein component to be successfully reared.

== Song production ==
=== Syrinx ===
Bird species produce some of the most complex sounds compared to any other animal. Singing is a learned behavior that has similarities with human speech. Birds breathe in oxygen past the throat and into the trachea where air splits off into either bronchial tube to reach the lungs. At the point where the trachea divides is where the sound producing organ called the syrinx lies. This avian song-producing organ is double-barrelled having two potential sound sources that are each under unilateral, ipsilateral neural control.

Different songbird species vary with their lateralized song production and rapid switching between left and right song production motor control. Even when birds are rapidly switching between the left and right sides of the syrinx, or producing songs unilaterally, the respiratory muscles on both sides are acting equally, making song production require symmetrical respiratory motor control and asymmetrical syrinx motor control. Respiratory air pressure can be used to identify the syllables of songs and control acoustic phonology when syringeal gating of airflow and motor control is compromised. Since the Bengalese finch has the ability to rapidly change the acoustic structure of their songs in response to deafening and experimental modulations of auditory feedback, they have gained considerable attention regarding the workings of their syrinx.

The Secora et al. (2012) study worked to characterize how the two sides of the Bengalese finch syrinx work to produce songs. With the use of syringeal denervation in a large sample group and air pressure recordings before and after unilateral nerve resection in a smaller sample group, data from this study provided evidence of syringeal specialization of acoustic control and rapid switching of motor control during Bengalese song production. It was discovered that the left side of the species' syrinx produces louder, higher frequency sounds above 2.2 kHz while the right side produces quieter, lower frequency sounds below 2.2 kHz. It was also found that higher peak frequency syllables are created by active motor control of the left side and they do not require active motor control from the right side of the syrinx. Thus, separate roles were discovered for the song production between the left and right sources of the Bengalese finch's syrinx.

=== Corticosterone ===
The Bengali finch is a domesticated form of the wild white-backed munia that has not had to undergo pressures of natural selection and adaptation to harsh environments. This caged bird has experienced safe, human controlled environmental conditions without shortages of food and water, without predation, and a low risk of parasitism. White-backed munias live under high stress conditions and they are subject to high fitness costs for survival, leaving them with simple songs in contrast to the relaxed conditions of the Bengali finch and their highly complex songs. Corticosterone is the main glucocorticoid hormone in birds that is released when the hypothalamic-pituitary-adrenal axis responds to stress stimuli. In juvenile birds, it improves food intake, foraging, begging calls, and aggression, therefore enhancing survival potential in the wild. It has also been found to decrease song complexity, encouraging the idea that low levels of corticosterone are required for the production of complex songs.

A Suzuki et al. (2014) compared the stress hormone levels of corticosterone in the domesticated Bengali finch in the wild ancestor, the white-backed munia. The faecal corticosterone levels were found to be much lower in the Bengali finch than the white-backed munia suggesting that stress hormone levels decrease with domestication. There is a relationship between the volume of song nuclei and developmental stress conditions showing males with larger song nuclei volumes having more complex songs. The results from this study provide significant evidence of the domestication of Bengalese finches causing a decrease in corticosterone levels which enhances song nuclei development and allows for the production of complex songs. Thus, stress hormone levels are one strong mechanism of song development important for understanding the evolutionary adaptations of the Bengali finch and other birds.

=== Age ===
Avian song production undergoes changes as the birds age, similar to the aging effects on motor behavior of human speech. Bengali finches sing less stereotyped songs and one week after experiencing deafening they exhibit a rapid deterioration of song syntax and acoustic structure.

The Cooper et al. (2012) study compared acoustic recordings of aging birds in sampling groups labelled 'middle aged' and 'aged' over the course of three years to measure syllable duration, pitch, and frequency. Results showed a decrease in pitch and frequency of the song syllables as the Bengali finches aged. The aged songbirds exhibited a slowed tempo caused by an increase in the silent intersyllable intervals which may be an effect of changes in the peripheral motor control. However, the data could not conclude a change in muscle fibers being the main cause of age related song changes. Therefore, this study helps to begin the exploration of age related Bengali song changes in connection with central nervous system control for future studies.

== Processing of songs in the brain ==
=== Hearing in birds ===
In order to process a song from another member of its species, a bird must first be able to perceive the song through hearing. Ear anatomy in birds varies from those in other terrestrial animals. Hearing takes place in the cochlea, a straight or slightly curved tube that varies in length depending on the bird species. The length of the cochlea is likely responsible for the differences in frequencies different species of birds are able to hear. Sensory receptor cells are located in hair cells that are tuned to specific frequencies which are stimulated by vibrations in the cochlea. Once a bird sings a song that signal is transmitted to surrounding birds through the air where the auditory signal is captured in the cochlea causing frequency encoded information to be sent to the brain to facilitate a response in the bird receiving the signal. Previous research has shown that most bird species hear best between 1 and 5 kHz.

=== Song signal pathways ===
Once a bird has heard the song of conspecific and the song signal has successfully traveled through the cochlea and to the brain, the brain must then process the signal in order to cause a response. Since birds are sensitive to both the temporal and frequency structures of songs, they are able to discriminate between songs while the brain categorizes them according to their type. When a bird is young it must learn its species' song template from either its parents or a tutor. In the sensorimotor phase when young birds are learning to sing they use this template stored in the neural circuitry of the brain to compare the songs they make to the memorized template in order to correct and refine their songs. The areas of the brain in which birdsong and learning take place are the motor pathway and the anterior forebrain pathway. The motor pathway begins in the high vocal center (HVC) and passes through the robust nucleus of the arcopallium (RA) which then reaches the tracheosyringeal portion of the hypoglossal nucleus. The anterior forebrain pathway also begins in the HVC where it then travels through what is known as Area X, the medial nucleus of the dorsolateral thalamus (DLM) and the lateral magnocellular nucleus of the anterior nidopallium before it reaches the RA. Temporal coding of song elements, motif, syllable and note are located in the HVC and the RA encodes the HVC firing commands to muscles that control the vocal output. In order to produce normal songs at any life stage the motor pathway must be intact, however, the anterior forebrain pathway only has to be intact for the song learning phase of a bird's life.

Birdsong learning has been largely studied but the neural basis of this behavior is not well understood. To understand this phenomenon a study was done on Bengalese finches by deafening some individuals and preventing tutoring in others and comparing the resulting songs with the songs of normal hearing individuals. Researchers compared the sizes of their song control nuclei and found no significant difference between those that were untutored and deafened and those with normal hearing although their songs were audibly affected. It was also found that the structures such as synaptic density and spontaneous firing rate of signals varied between normal hearing and altered hearing individuals.

Another point of contention in song processing has been how song element sequences are represented in the songbird brain. Bengalese finches were used as the focal study species in research done by Nishikawa, Okada & Okanoya (2008) which aimed to determine which of the alternate views of neural representation occur in the songbird brain. Single-unit activities of HVC neurons driven by all possible element pair stimuli in sedated Bengalese finches were recorded using five different types of sound stimulus. Researchers showed that the HVC neurons have broad and differential responses to song element sequences which they found through the sequential response distributions for each neuron. This study shows that the song element sequence is encoded in the HVC neural population which can describe the neurobiology of this species helping to explain how songs are perceived in the brain.

=== How song production occurs in the brain ===
When it comes to how the brain produces songs, Bengalese finches have been shown to display syringeal specialization. One possible explanation for why each side of the vocal muscle produces different frequencies is that there are neural constraints. It has been suggested that there may be lateralization between the brain hemispheres leading to biased auditory sensory or motor control. The left hemisphere of the brain may be better tuned to process higher frequency sounds than the right hemisphere which may specialize in low frequency sounds. Regardless of whether one side is responsible for a specific set of frequencies over another, both hemispheres of the brain must work simultaneously to produce a song. Because Bengalese finches have been shown to use the two sides of their syrinx in different ways during vocal production, it has been established that bilateral hemispheric control is required to coordinate and regulate these contrasting syringeal activities. In this kind of highly lateralized song production the neural brain activity must be asymmetric so that the different behavioral aspects are executed correctly. While one hemisphere directs the use of one side of the syrinx, the other must prevent sound production. Interhemispheric switching has been observed in zebra finches, but Bengalese finches have been suggested as a better model organism of study due to their ability of distinct and rapid switching of higher and lower frequency ranges to control note structure within a syllable. Further research in this field will allow for a better understanding of how the songbird brain controls songs because of the patterns of syringeal control and rapid hemispheric switching in Bengalese finches.

Neural mechanisms of song production have been found to vary by species. Bengalese finches have been found to require real-time auditory feedback in order to produce normal songs even in adulthood. The results of a study by Okanoya and Yamaguchi in 1997 illustrated this point and suggest that in order for the brain to produce normal songs, ongoing interaction between the auditory feedback and the motor pathway of the brain for song recognition may be required. The location in the brain where the interaction of auditory feedback with the motor pathway occurs is unknown in the Bengalese finch brain and its recognition may provide insight into how auditory feedback interacts with motor pathways in individuals and between species. Bengalese finches have been widely used in song learning and processing studies because they are a closed ended learner that generate variable songs which has allowed researchers to comprehensively understand songbird song production with implications for understanding human vocal learning and comprehension.

== Female choice ==
Since male songbirds create their own songs through learning, each has its own unique variation indicating differences in male quality to the females during courtship. Male courtship songs have multiple components defined by intervals of silence in between them. Components are produced in the same sequence called a chunk and songs are composed of several chunks. The complexity of a song is determined by the number of sequence patterns or components, making a song that occurs in the same order 'simple', and a song with a random order of components 'complex'. The phonological components and complexity of chunks vary from male to male because they learn their own father's song during early developmental years. Therefore, songs are helpful in allowing females to choose a better mate for reproductive success.

A study done by Kato, Hasegawa & Okanoya (2010) tested female preference using the female's father's songs and unfamiliar songs. There was a clear indication of female preference for their own father's familiar song over the unfamiliar songs showing an ability to differentiate between song components. This result demonstrates limited learning of their own species' song during critical periods, however, the domesticated Bengali finch has never had to undergo a natural critical period. In addition, the results from the study did not support the idea of females preferring complexity over simplicity in song sequences. These findings differ from past examinations, like the Morisaka, Katahira & Okanoya (2008) study that suggested evidence of female Bengali finches preferring complex songs over simple ones. Evolutionary adaptations of specifically complex song production in relation to female preference in Bengali finches continues to be a topic worth examining.

== Comparison with zebra finches ==
Bengali finches and zebra finches are members of the estrildidae family and are age-limited learners when it comes to song learning and the acoustic characteristics of their songs. Both of these species have been widely used in song learning based animal behavior research and although they share many characteristics researchers have been able to determine stark differences between the two.

Previous to research done in 1987, it was thought that song learning in Bengali finches was similar to zebra finches but there was no research to support this idea. Both species require learning from an adult during a sensitive juvenile phase in order to learn the species specific and sexually dimorphic songs. This tutor can be the father of the young or other adult males that are present around the juvenile. Clayton (1987) aimed to directly compare the song learning ability of both of these species to determine if they have separate learning behaviors. Twenty clutches of Bengali finches were raised in four conditions varying the male that was available to learn from to determine how learning occurs and if Bengali finch juveniles are able to produce species specific songs when raised with tutors rather than their male parent. Young males in both species based their songs on the tutor male they interacted with within 35–70 days of age where normally raised males failed to reproduce song elements heard before or after this time. The outcome of the research showed that song learning in Bengali finches is very similar to learning in zebra finches. The contrast between the species found in this study was that unlike zebra finches, Bengali finches did not incorporate notes of the mother's call when they were raised without a present male.

Many of the research study methods have included deafening Bengali finches and zebra finches to determine the rate of decline in calls as well as to understand how individuals deafened in the sensitive learning phase acquire the knowledge for producing species specific songs. For Bengali finches the degradation of songs following deafening is within one week where in zebra finches the degradation begins in four to six weeks post deafening. Long term direct comparisons of zebra finches and Bengali finches has not been broadly studied, however, a study done by Watanabe & Sakaguchi (2010) revealed important information concerning auditory feedback and song maintenance. The results of the research showed deafening zebra finches resulted in a gradual and significant decrease in high frequency syllables compensated for with an increase in low frequency syllables which is consistent with results from deafening Bengali finches. The change took longer in zebra finches, but the adult songs in both species were shown to be similar following auditory deprivation indicating that the neural mechanisms involved may be present in both species.

Deepening the contrast between these two species is the critical factor that Bengali finches require real-time auditory feedback for normal song syntax. Zebra finches do not require immediate feedback to maintain learned songs and their songs are highly stereotyped, short, and discrete while Bengali finch songs are highly variable.

The information gained by Secora et al. (2012) concerning syringeal specialization turned out to be in high contrast to what was known about zebra finch song production. In this study on Bengali finches it was found that louder and higher frequency sounds are produced with the left side of the syrinx while the right side produces softer and lower frequency syllables. This pattern is directly opposite of what is known about the closely related zebra finch. In zebra finches the right side of the syrinx produces song syllables with frequencies above 3 kHz. In addition zebra finches produce most of their song syllables bilaterally with only a few high frequency notes produced unilaterally. The results of Secora et al. (2012) of interhemispheric switching as an explanation for this phenomenon in Bengali finches is seen to a degree in zebra finches, however, they suggest it may be far more pronounced in Bengali finches.

The Bengali and zebra finch are closely related oscine songbirds that have been pivotal to the study of song learning, maintenance, and retention. Research conducted on these species has led to a more rounded understanding of the acquisition of speech in human children and the age related changes in motor performance. Without the information gained from research of song learning in these bird species developmental learning in humans would be much less understood. The similarities and differences compared between the Bengali and zebra finch further comparative studies on the neural basis of learning in many different species.
