= Essarois =

- Commune
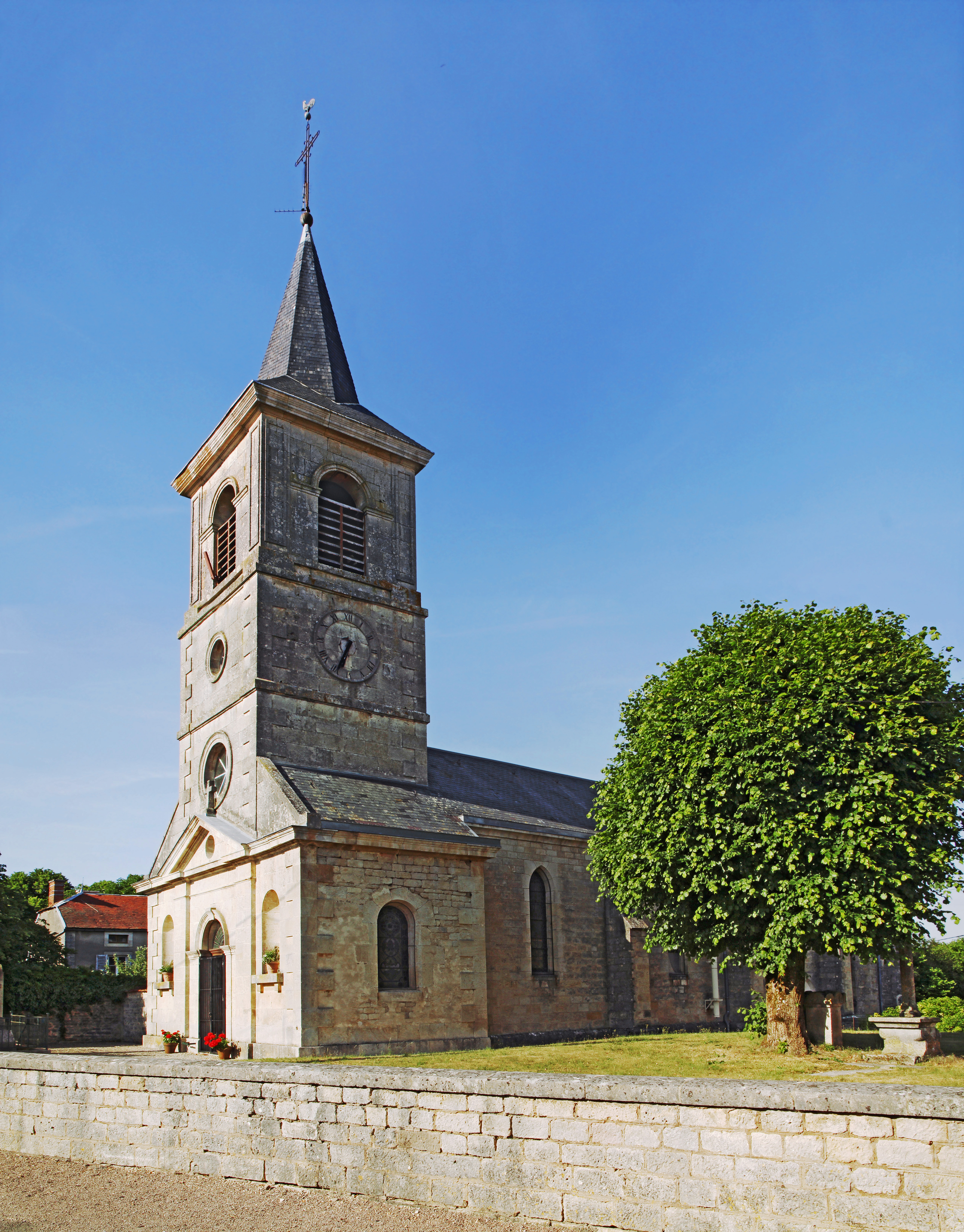
- The church in Essarois

- Coat of arms
- Location of Essarois
- Location within France Location within Bourgogne-Franche-Comté
- Coordinates: 47°45′15″N 4°47′07″E
- Country: France
- Region: Bourgogne-Franche-Comté
- Department: Côte-d'Or
- Arrondissement: Montbard
- Canton: Châtillon-sur-Seine
- Intercommunality: Pays Châtillonnais

Government
  - Mayor (2020–2026): André Lippiello
- Area^{1}: 18.25 km^{2} (7.05 sq mi)
- Elevation: 350 m (1,150 ft)
- Highest elevation: 428 m (1,404 ft)
- Lowest elevation: 277 m (909 ft)
- Population (2023): 84
  - Density: 4.6/km^{2} (12/sq mi)
- Time zone: UTC+01:00 (CET)
  - Summer (DST): UTC+02:00 (CEST)
- INSEE/Postal code: 21250 /21290
- ^{1} French Land Register data, which excludes lakes, ponds, glaciers > 1 km^{2} (0.386 sq mi or 247 acres) and river estuaries.

Essarois (French pronunciation: [esaʁwa]) is a commune in the Côte-d'Or department in eastern France.

== Population ==
Historical population
Year	Pop.	±% p.a.
1968	150	—
1975	101	−5.49%
1982	90	−1.63%
1990	93	+0.41%
1999	93	+0.00%
2007	91	−0.27%
2012	86	−1.12%
2017	91	+1.14%
2023	84	−1.33%
Source: INSEE

== See also ==
- Communes of the Côte-d'Or department
