= Eugenia Osterberger =

Spanish pianist and composer

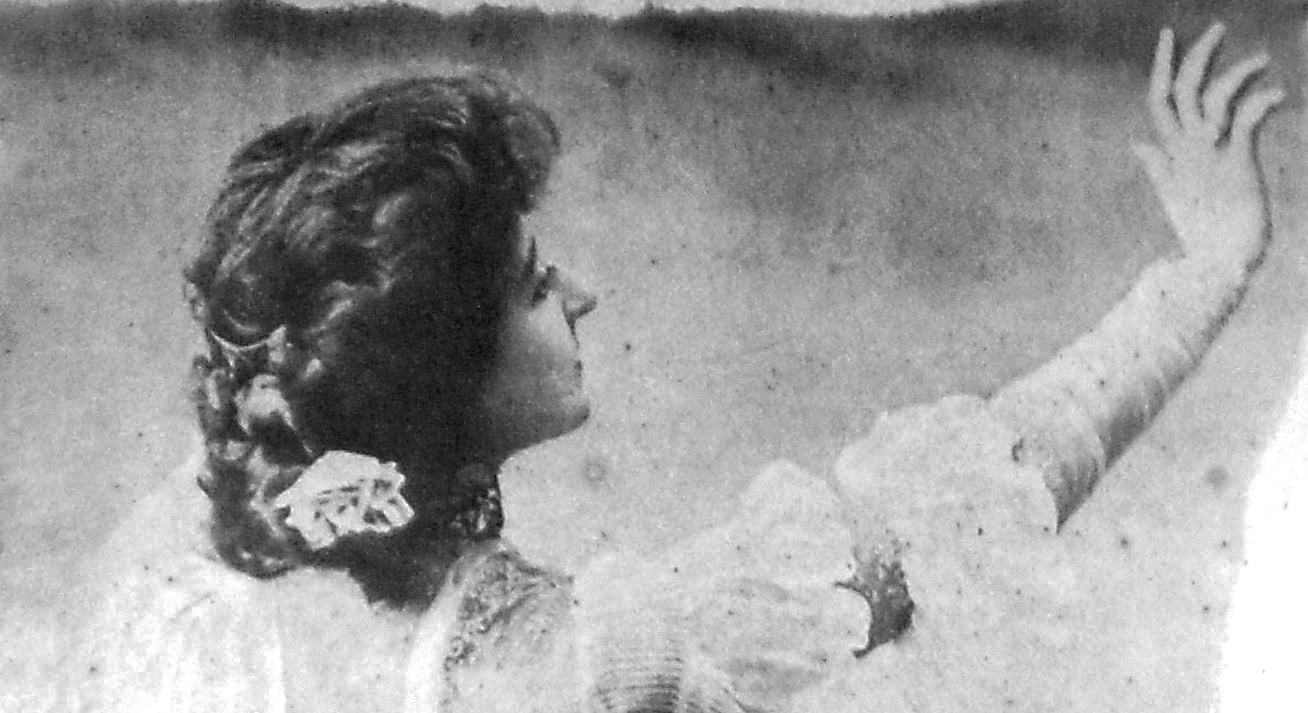
- Eugenia Osterberger, conducting

Background information
- Birth name: Prudencia Eugenia Juana Osterberger
- Also known as: Madame Saunier
- Born: 20 December 1852 Santiago de Compostela, Spain
- Died: 8 February 1932 (aged 79) Nice, France
- Occupation: Composer
- Instrument: Piano
- Member of: Royal Galician Academy

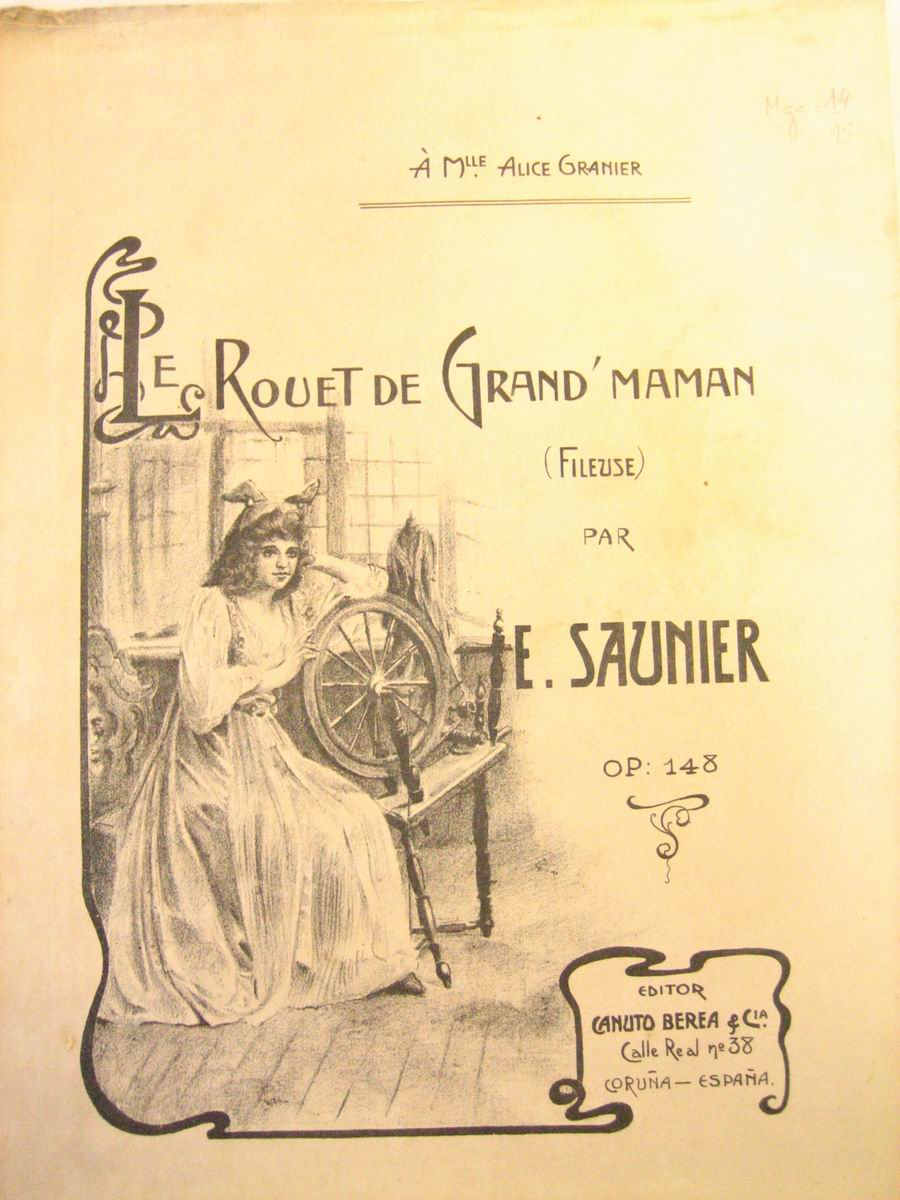
Le Rouet de Grand'maman, 1904

Prudencia Eugenia Juana Osterberger (20 December 1852 – 8 February 1932), also known as Madame Saunier, was a Spanish pianist and composer who became a major contributor to the cultural life of the Spanish province of Galicia in the late 19th century. She composed both piano solo pieces and Galician songs with piano accompaniment.

== Biography ==
Born on 20 December 1852 in Santiago de Compostela, Prudencia Eugenia Juana Osterberger was the daughter of Jorge Osterberger, an Alsatian lithographer, and his Galician wife Emilia Luard Álvarez. She received an unusually extensive education for women of her times, both in France (at Juilly, Seine-et-Marne) and locally. Her uncle, Justo Luard, ensured her introduction to the piano. In October 1877, she married the French engineer François Saunier. In 1880, the couple moved to La Coruña where Saunier became director of the gas works.

There she became closely associated with Galician culture. She published her compositions both locally and in Paris and Madrid. Together with the writer Emilia Pardo Bazán she helped to establish the Royal Galician Academy, becoming a corresponding member.

Her piano compositions include sonatas, nocturnes, bagatelles, scherzi, waltzes and berceuses, frequently in the style of established composers such as Ravel, Schubert or Mendelssohn. Drawing on the works of contemporary poets including Carlos Vaamonde Lores, Manuel Lois Vázquez and Marqués de Figueroa, she composed Galician songs along the lines of those by José Baldomir, Juan Montes Capón or Enrique Lens Viera. They include "Falas de Nai", "Ausencia. Melodía gallega" and "Adiós a Galicia".

In 1907, she and her husband moved to Nice in the south of France where she died on 8 February 1932.

== Publications ==
In 1896 under the name E. Saunier, she published Théâtre illustré, pour piano: paroles et musique
