= Nonsyndromic deafness =

- Other names: Non-syndromic genetic deafness

Nonsyndromic deafness is hearing loss that is not associated with other signs and symptoms. In contrast, syndromic deafness involves hearing loss that occurs with abnormalities in other parts of the body. Nonsyndromic deafness constitutes 75% of all hearing loss cases, and an estimated 100 genes are thought to be linked to this condition. About 80% are linked to autosomal recessive inheritance, 15% to autosomal dominant inheritance, 1-3% through the X chromosome, and 0.5-1% are associated with mitochondrial inheritance.

Genetic changes are related to the following types of nonsyndromic deafness:

- DFNA: nonsyndromic deafness, autosomal dominant
- DFNB: nonsyndromic deafness, autosomal recessive
- DFNX: nonsyndromic deafness, X-linked
- nonsyndromic deafness, mitochondrial

Each type is numbered in the order in which it was described. For example, DFNA1 was the first described autosomal dominant type of nonsyndromic deafness. Mitochondrial nonsyndromic deafness involves changes to the small amount of DNA found in mitochondria, the energy-producing centers within cells.

Most forms of nonsyndromic deafness are associated with permanent hearing loss caused by damage to structures in the inner ear. The inner ear consists of three parts: a snail-shaped structure called the cochlea that helps process sound, nerves that send information from the cochlea to the brain, and structures involved with balance. Loss of hearing caused by changes in the inner ear is called sensorineural deafness. Hearing loss that results from changes in the middle ear is called conductive hearing loss. The middle ear contains three tiny bones that help transfer sound from the eardrum to the inner ear. Some forms of nonsyndromic deafness involve changes in both the inner ear and the middle ear; this combination is called mixed hearing loss.

The severity of hearing loss varies and can change over time. It can affect one ear (unilateral) or both ears (bilateral). Degrees of hearing loss range from mild (difficulty understanding soft speech) to profound (inability to hear even very loud noises). The loss may be stable, or it may progress as a person gets older. Particular types of nonsyndromic deafness often show distinctive patterns of hearing loss. For example, the loss may be more pronounced at high, middle, or low tones.

== Classification ==
Nonsyndromic deafness can occur at any age. Hearing loss that is present before a child learns to speak is classified as prelingual or congenital. Hearing loss that occurs after the development of speech is classified as postlingual.

== Genetics ==
Nonsyndromic deafness can have different patterns of inheritance. Between 75% and 80% of cases are inherited in an autosomal recessive pattern, which means two copies of the gene in each cell are altered. Usually, each parent of an individual with autosomal recessive deafness is a carrier of one copy of the altered gene. These carriers do not have hearing loss.

Another 20% to 25% of nonsyndromic deafness cases are autosomal dominant, which means one copy of the altered gene in each cell is sufficient to result in hearing loss. People with autosomal dominant deafness most often inherit an altered copy of the gene from a parent who has hearing loss.

Between 1% and 2% of cases show an X-linked pattern of inheritance, which means the mutated gene responsible for the condition is located on the X chromosome. Males with X-linked nonsyndromic deafness tend to develop more severe hearing loss earlier in life than females who inherit a copy of the same gene mutation. Fathers will not pass X-linked traits to their sons since they do not pass on the X chromosome to their male offspring.

Mitochondrial nonsyndromic deafness, which results from changes to the DNA in mitochondria, occurs in fewer than 1% of cases in the United States. The altered mitochondrial DNA is passed from a mother to her sons and daughters. This type of deafness is not inherited from fathers.

Late-onset progressive deafness is the most common neurological disability of the elderly. Although hearing loss of greater than 25 decibels is present in only 1% of young adults between ages 18 and 24, this increases to 10% in persons between 55 and 64 years of age and approximately 50% in octogenarians.

The relative contribution of heredity to age-related hearing impairment is not known, however, the majority of inherited late-onset deafness is autosomal dominant and non-syndromic (Van Camp et al., 1997). Over forty genes associated with autosomal dominant non-syndromic hearing loss have been localized and of these fifteen have been cloned.

=== Genes related to nonsyndromic deafness ===
Mutations in the ACTG1, CABP2, CDH23, CLDN14, COCH, COL11A2, DFNA5, ESPN, EYA4, GJB2, GJB6, KCNQ4, MYO15A, MYO6, MYO7A, OTOF, PCDH15, POU3F4, SLC26A4, STRC, TECTA, TMC1, TMIE, TMPRSS3, USH1C, and WFS1 genes cause nonsyndromic deafness, with weaker evidence currently implicating genes CCDC50, DIAPH1, DSPP, ESRRB, GJB3, GRHL2, GRXCR1, HGF, LHFPL5, LOXHD1, LRTOMT, MARVELD2, MIR96, MYH14, MYH9, MYO1A, MYO3A, OTOA, PJVK, POU4F3, PRPS1, PTPRQ, RDX, SERPINB6, SIX1, SLC17A8, TPRN, TRIOBP, SLC26A5, and WHRN.

The causes of nonsyndromic deafness can be complex. Researchers have identified more than 30 genes that, when mutated, may cause nonsyndromic deafness; however, some of these genes have not been fully characterized. Many genes related to deafness are involved in the development and function of the inner ear. Gene mutations interfere with critical steps in processing sound, resulting in hearing loss. Different mutations in the same gene can cause different types of hearing loss, and some genes are associated with both syndromic and nonsyndromic deafness. In many families, the gene(s) involved have yet to be identified.

Deafness can also result from environmental factors or a combination of genetic and environmental factors, including certain medications, peri-natal infections (infections occurring before or after birth), and exposure to loud noise over an extended period.

Types include:

OMIM	Gene	Type
124900	DIAPH1	DFNA1
600101	KCNQ4	DFNA2A
612644	GJB3	DFNA2B
601544	GJB2	DFNA3A
612643	GJB6	DFNA3B
600652	MYH14	DFNA4
600994	DFNA5	DFNA5
601543	TECTA	DFNA8/12
601369	COCH	DFNA9
601316	EYA4	DFNA10
601317	MYO7A	DFNA11, neurosensory
601868	COL11A2	DFNA13
602459	POU4F3	DFNA15
603622	MYH9	DFNA17
604717	ACTG1	DFNA20/26
606346	MYO6	DFNA22
605192	SIX1	DFNA23
605583	SLC17A8	DFNA25
608641	GRHL2	DFNA28
606705	TMC1	DFNA36
605594	DSPP	DFNA36, with dentinogenesis
607453	CCDC50	DFNA44
607841	MYO1A	DFNA48
613074	MIR96	DFNA50
220290	GJB2	DFNB1A
612645	GJB6	DFNB1B
600060	MYO7A	DFNB2, neurosensory (see also Usher syndrome)
600316	MYO15A	DFNB3
600971	TMIE	DFNB6
600974	TMC1	DFNB7
601072	TMPRSS3	DFNB8, childhood onset
601071	OTOF	DFNB9
601386	CDH23	DFNB12
603720	STRC	DFNB16
602092	USH1C	DFNB18
603629	TECTA	DFNB21
607039	OTOA	DFNB22
609533	PCDH15	DFNB23
611022	RDX	DFNB24
613285	GRXCR1	DFNB25
609823	TRIOBP	DFNB28
614035	CLDN14	DFNB29
607101	MYO3A	DFNB30
607084	WHRN	DFNB31
608565	ESRRB	DFNB35
609006	ESPN	DFNB36
607821	MYO6	DFNB37
608265	HGF	DFNB39
610153	MARVELD2	DFNB49
609706	COL11A2	DFNB53
610220	PJVK	DFNB59
611451	LRTOMT	DFNB63
610265	LHFPL5	DFNB67
613079	LOXHD1	DFNB77
613307	TPRN	DFNB79
613391	PTPRQ	DFNB84
613453	SERPINB6	DFNB91
614899	CABP2	DFNB93
304500	PRPS1	DFNX1
304400	POU3F4	DFNX2
580000	MT-RNR1, COX1	deafness, aminoglycoside-induced
500008	(several mtDNA)	DFN, sensorineural, mt

== Diagnosis ==
The diagnosis of nonsyndromic deafness involves a comprehensive assessment to determine the cause of hearing loss in an individual without associated syndromic features. Key steps in the diagnosis may include:

- Clinical evaluation: A detailed medical history will be obtained to identify factors that may contribute to hearing loss, such as exposure to loud noise, ototoxic medications, or a family history of hearing impairment. Additionally, a physical examination will be conducted to check for visible abnormalities or signs of underlying conditions.
- Genetic testing: Genetic testing may be recommended, especially if there is a family history of hearing loss. Nonsyndromic deafness can be caused by mutations in various genes associated with auditory function. Besides, high-throughput DNA sequencing methods can be employed to screen multiple genes simultaneously.
- Audiological testing: This may include different tests such as Pure-tone audiometry, Speech audiometry, Otoacoustic emissions, or Auditory brainstem response.

In some cases, other methods may be conducted, including imaging techniques such as CT or MRI, to examine the structures of the inner ear and identify any abnormalities in the cochlea or auditory nerve. Screening blood tests for metabolic conditions or infections that could contribute to hearing loss may also be recommended.

== Treatment ==
Treatment is supportive and consists of management of- manifestations. Use of hearing aids and/or cochlear implants, suitable educational programs can be offered. Periodic surveillance is also important.

== Epidemiology ==
About 1 in 1,000 children in the United States is born with profound deafness. By age 9, about 3 in 1,000 children have hearing loss that affects the activities of daily living. More than half of these cases are caused by genetic factors. Most cases of genetic deafness (70% to 80%) are nonsyndromic; the remaining cases are caused by specific genetic syndromes. In adults, the chance of developing hearing loss increases with age; hearing loss affects half of all people older than 80 years.

== See also ==
- Y-linked deafness, type 1
