= LRTOMT =

Protein-coding gene in the species Homo sapiens

Identifiers
- Aliases: LRTOMT, CFAP111, DFNB63, LRRC51, leucine rich transmembrane and O-methyltransferase domain containing, TOMT, LRRC51-TOMT
- External IDs: OMIM: 612414; MGI: 3769724; GeneCards: LRTOMT
Enzyme activity
EC #	BRENDA	ExPASy	KEGG	MetaCyc
2.1.1.6	↗	↗	↗	↗

Gene location (Human)
Chr.	Chromosome 11 (human)
Band	11q13.4	Start	72,080,331 bp
Band	11q13.4	End	72,110,782 bp

Gene location (Mouse)
Chr.	Chromosome 7 (mouse)
Band	7 E2|7	Start	101,547,577 bp
Band	7 E2|7	End	101,555,566 bp
RNA expression pattern
Bgee	Human / Mouse (ortholog); Top expressed in: testicle; right testis; left testis; olfactory zone of nasal mucosa; ganglionic eminence; stromal cell of endometrium; fallopian tube; islet of Langerhans; gonad; ventricular zone / Top expressed in: morula; embryo; granulocyte; blastocyst; primary oocyte; epiblast; white adipose tissue; placenta; ovary; proximal tubule; More reference expression data
BioGPS	n/a
Gene ontology
Molecular function	methyltransferase activity; transferase activity; O-methyltransferase activity; L-dopa O-methyltransferase activity; catechol O-methyltransferase activity; orcinol O-methyltransferase activity
Cellular component	cytoplasm; integral component of membrane; membrane; plasma membrane; endoplasmic reticulum; cellular component
Biological process	methylation; hearing; catecholamine metabolic process; neurotransmitter catabolic process; catecholamine catabolic process; auditory receptor cell development; developmental process; dopamine metabolic process
Sources:Amigo / QuickGO
Orthologs
Databases	NCBI: entry; OMA: entry
Species	Human	Mouse
Entrez	220074	791260
Ensembl	ENSG00000284922	ENSMUSG00000078630
UniProt	Q8WZ04; Q96E66	A1Y9I9
RefSeq (mRNA)	NM_001145308; NM_001145309; NM_001145310	NM_001081679; NM_001282088
RefSeq (protein)	NP_001138779; NP_001138780; NP_001138781; NP_001138782; NP_001192067 NP_001258400; NP_001305732; NP_660352; NP_001138779.1; NP_001192067.1; NP_001258400.1; NP_660352.1; NP_001305732.1	NP_001075148; NP_001269017
Location (UCSC)	Chr 11: 72.08 – 72.11 Mb	Chr 7: 101.55 – 101.56 Mb
PubMed search
- Wikidata
View/Edit Human	View/Edit Mouse

Leucine rich transmembrane and O-methyltransferase domain containing is a protein that is encoded by the LRTOMT gene in humans. This locus represents naturally occurring read-through transcript between the neighboring LRRC51 (leucine-rich repeat containing 51) and TOMT (transmembrane O-methyltransferase) genes on chromosome 11. Mutations in LRTOMT are associated with the DFNB63 form of autosomal recessive nonsyndromic hearing loss.

== Gene ==
LRTOMT is a fusion between the LRRC51 and TOMT genes in humans. The fusion gene contains 10 exons that encode two separate proteins translated from unique and overlapping open reading frames (ORFs). Translation of LRTOMT1, a protein that contains leucine-rich repeats, starts in exon 3 and stops at exon 6. Translation of LRTOMT2, also known as TOMT or COMT2, starts in exon 5 and ends at exon 10. Human TOMT has a predicted methyltransferase domain that is conserved with catechol-o-methyltransferase (COMT) and a single predicted transmembrane alpha helix. Mice and zebrafish have separate genes for Lrrc51 and Tomt.

== Function ==
TOMT is required for cochlear hair cell function and is associated with components of the mechanoelectrical transduction (MET) channel, including TMC1. While the mechanism by which TOMT contributes to MET currents and auditory function is currently unknown, the methyltransferase domain is likely not involved. Mutations in TOMT disrupt the stereocilia localization of MET channel subunits and are thus thought to affect MET currents. These results have also been illustrated in multiple mutations in both mice and zebrafish.

== Clinical significance ==
Over 20 variants in TOMT have been shown to cause hearing loss in humans. Populations reported to be most affected by TOMT-related hearing loss include Iranian and Tunisian families.

Identified Variants
Variant	Identified Population
Leu16Pro	Iranian
Ala29Ser (frameshift)	Turkish
Thr33His (frameshift)	American
Met34Ilu	Iranian
Pro36Leu (frameshift)	Iranian
Ser45Ser (frameshift)	Iranian
Glu40Asp	Iranian
Arg41Trp	Iranian
Arg52Trp	Pakistani
Arg54Gln	Japanese
Leu60Pro	Mauritanian
Trp65Arg	Tunisian
Arg70X	Iranian
Tyr71X	Iranian
Glu80Asp	Iranian
Arg81Gln	Tunisian
Phe83Leu	Czech
Trp105Arg	Tunisian
Glu110Lys	Tunisian
Tyr111X	Iranian
Arg158His	Chinese
Ala170Ala (frameshift)	Iranian
Ilu188Thr (frameshift)	Japanese
Arg219X	Chinese

While most variations cause prelingual profound sensorineural deafness, one patient with compound heterozygous mutations (Arg52Trp and Arg54Gln) was reported to develop ski-slope hearing loss starting at age 11.

TOMT has also been associated with postmenopausal osteoporosis in rats. Specifically, LRTOMT downregulation after ovariectomy was significantly correlated with decreased bone density and changes in bone microstructure.
