= ESPN (disambiguation) =

ESPN, formerly Entertainment and Sports Programming Network, is an American broadcast sports network.

ESPN may also refer to:

- ESPN Inc., an American sports media company, the parent company of ESPN
  - ESPN International, a list of international channels carrying the name ESPN
  - ESPN (streaming service), a streaming service
- East Penn Railroad (reporting mark: ESPN)
- ESPN, a gene for the protein Espin
