= OCEL1 =

Protein-coding gene in the species Homo sapiens

Identifiers
- Aliases: OCEL1, FWP009, S863-9, occludin/ELL domain containing 1
- External IDs: MGI: 1924340; GeneCards: OCEL1

Gene location (Human)
Chr.	Chromosome 19 (human)
Band	19p13.11	Start	17,226,213 bp
Band	19p13.11	End	17,229,219 bp

Gene location (Mouse)
Chr.	Chromosome 8 (mouse)
Band	8|8 B3.3	Start	71,823,942 bp
Band	8|8 B3.3	End	71,832,005 bp
RNA expression pattern
Bgee	Human / Mouse (ortholog); Top expressed in: right uterine tube; right lobe of liver; mucosa of transverse colon; granulocyte; apex of heart; right lobe of thyroid gland; muscle of thigh; right adrenal gland; left lobe of thyroid gland; right adrenal cortex / Top expressed in: plantaris muscle; lactiferous gland; spermatocyte; ankle joint; granulocyte; perirhinal cortex; seminiferous tubule; entorhinal cortex; spermatid; right kidney; More reference expression data
BioGPS	n/a
Orthologs
Databases	NCBI: entry; OMA: entry
Species	Human	Mouse
Entrez	79629	77090
Ensembl	ENSG00000099330	ENSMUSG00000002396
UniProt	Q9H607	Q8VCR9
RefSeq (mRNA)	NM_024578	NM_001293800; NM_029865
RefSeq (protein)	NP_078854	NP_001280729; NP_084141
Location (UCSC)	Chr 19: 17.23 – 17.23 Mb	Chr 8: 71.82 – 71.83 Mb
PubMed search
- Wikidata
View/Edit Human	View/Edit Mouse

OCEL1, also called Occludin//ELL Domain Containing 1, is a protein encoding gene located at chromosome 19p13.11 in the human genome. Other aliases for the gene include FLJ22709, FWP009, and S863-9. The function of OCEL1 has not yet been identified.

== Gene ==
Though the gene’s function is currently unknown, it is part of a family of genes that are related to occludin, which is an enzyme localized at tight junctions of epithelial and endothelial cells, and are also related to eleven-nineteen lysine-rich leukemia (ELL), which is an elongation factor that can increase the rate of RNA polymerase II transcription. There are five paralogs of OCEL1 in this gene family: ELL, ELL2, ELL3, MARVELD2, and OCLN. OCEL1 and each of its five paralogs all contain the Occludin/ELL Domain (pfam07303), suggesting their functions may be related to protein interactions.

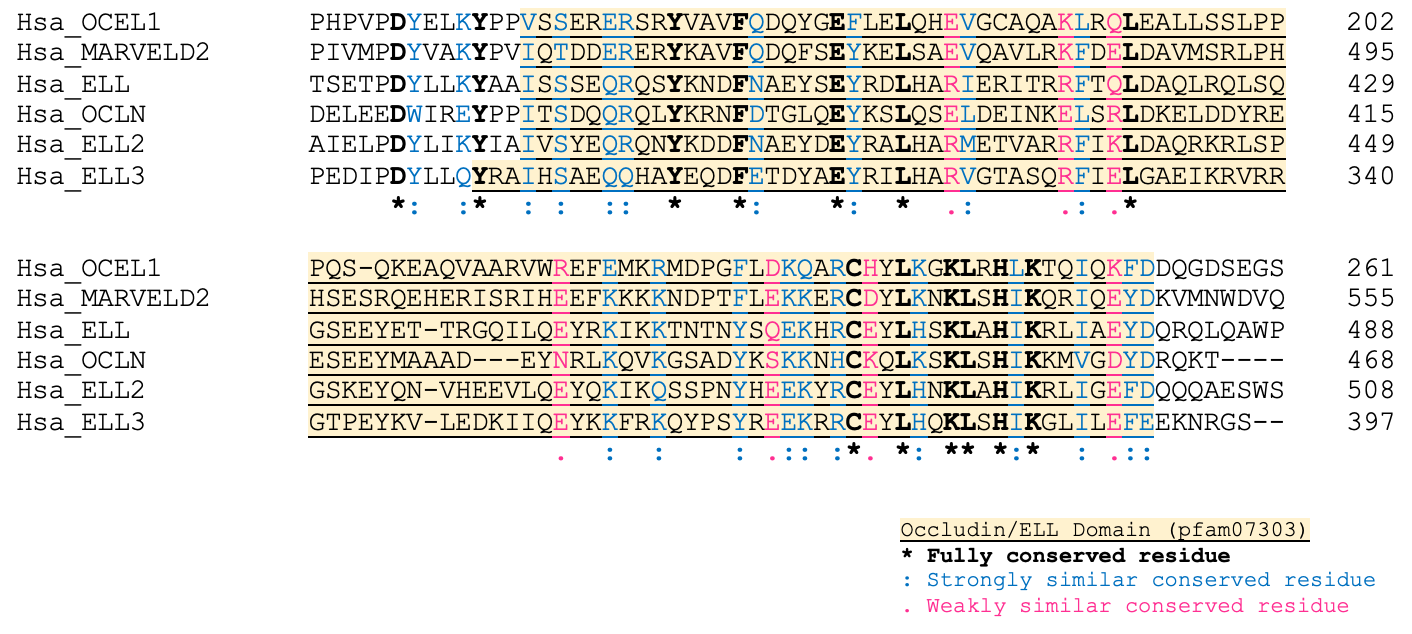
MSA for the Occludin/ELL Domain in OCEL1 and its five human paralogs. The beginnings and ends of each paralog were trimmed.

== Protein ==
The protein encoded by OCEL1 is called Occludin/ELL Domain Containing Protein 1. The protein is 264 amino acids in length. It is made up of 6 distinct exons and contains the ELL/Occludin Domain. OCEL1 has 15 different splice variations. The molecular weight of OCEL1 is approximately 28-29 kDa. The predicted isoelectric point for the protein is 10. There are 3 isoforms for the OCEL1 protein: isoform X1, isoform X2, and isoform X3. Only isoforms X1 and X2 contain the ELL/Occludin Domain. The OCEL1 protein contains a proline-rich domain spanning from amino acid 28-106; the protein has two standard deviations more of proline than average.

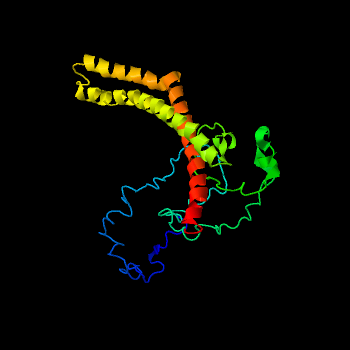
Tertiary structure of the human OCEL1 protein as predicted by iTASSER.

The secondary structure of OCEL1 is predicted to contain several alpha helices but no beta pleated sheets. There are no predicted sulfide bridges or transmembrane domains in the protein. The tertiary structure as predicted by iTASSER shows multiple alpha helices coiling with each other.

The OCEL1 protein is localized in the Golgi apparatus, but can also be found at low levels in the nucleus.

== Expression ==
OCEL1 is expressed at detectable levels in all human tissues with low tissue specificity. Expression in the kidney is low relative to other tissues during human fetal development, but is relatively higher in adults.

Expression of OCEL1 may be regulated by several miRNA binding sites predicted to be in the 3' UTR of the gene:

- Hsa-miR-7113-5p
- Hsa-miR-653-3p
- Hsa-miR-765
- Hsa-miR-665

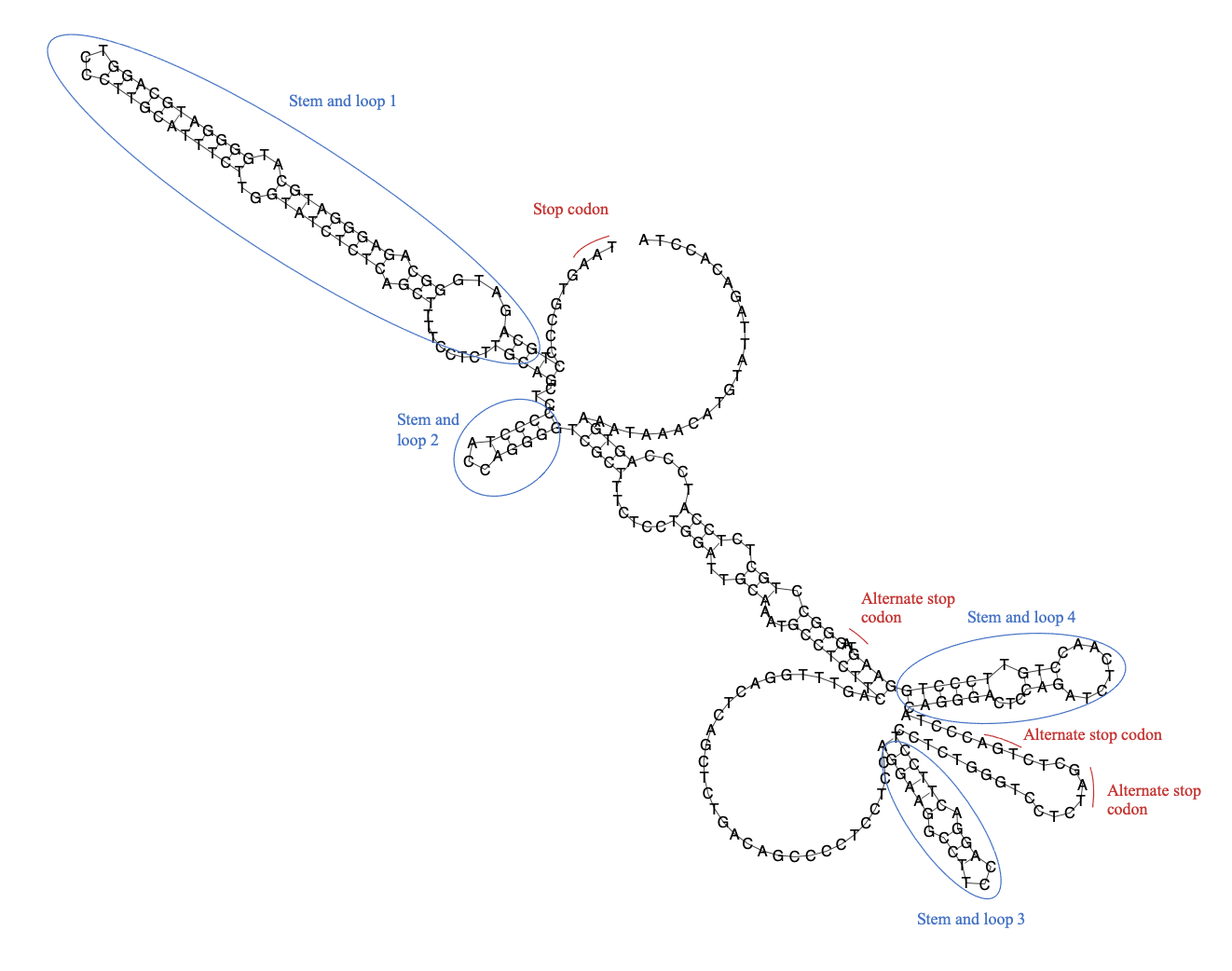
RNA folding of the 3’ UTR in OCEL1 generated with RNAfold Web Server.

== Homology and evolution ==
In addition to its five paralogs in the human genome, the OCEL1 gene has 234 known orthologs in other species. Its orthologs are found in jawed vertebrates, including birds, alligators, turtles, lizards, mammals, amphibians, coelacanths, bony fish, and cartilaginous fish. Some orthologs contain both the ELL/Occludin Domain and the MARVELD2 Domain, suggesting the OCEL1 protein and MARVELD2 protein are closely related.

== Interacting proteins ==
The OCEL1 protein has been found to interact with two proteins via protein kinase assays; SRPK1, known as SRSF protein kinase I, and SRPK2, known as SRSF protein kinase II, which are both localized to the nucleus of the cell. SRSF protein kinase I and II both primarily function to phosphorylate proteins at serine residues and also phosphorylates serine residue splicing factors.

== Clinical significance ==
The OCEL1 gene may be related to some cancers. Low expression of OCEL1 is associated with poor prognosis in patients with human non-small cell lung cancer. OCEL1, when grouped with three other genes, is thought to be an effective predictor for the paclitaxel response in humans with HER2-negative breast cancer.
