= GJB6 =

Protein-coding gene in the species Homo sapiens

Identifiers
- Aliases: GJB6, CX30, DFNA3, DFNA3B, DFNB1B, ECTD2, ED2, EDH, HED, HED2, gap junction protein beta 6
- External IDs: OMIM: 604418; MGI: 107588; HomoloGene: 4936; GeneCards: GJB6; OMA:GJB6 - orthologs

Gene location (Human)
Chr.	Chromosome 13 (human)
Band	13q12.11	Start	20,221,962 bp
Band	13q12.11	End	20,232,365 bp

Gene location (Mouse)
Chr.	Chromosome 14 (mouse)
Band	14 C3|14 30.1 cM	Start	57,360,760 bp
Band	14 C3|14 30.1 cM	End	57,371,068 bp
RNA expression pattern
Bgee	Human / Mouse (ortholog); Top expressed in: skin of arm; gums; gingival epithelium; human penis; vulva; mucosa of pharynx; oral cavity; skin of thigh; body of tongue; skin of hip / Top expressed in: utricle; stria vascularis; transitional epithelium of urinary bladder; deep cerebellar nuclei; vestibular membrane of cochlear duct; mammillary body; cerebellar cortex; vestibular sensory epithelium; lumbar subsegment of spinal cord; medial vestibular nucleus; More reference expression data
BioGPS	n/a
Orthologs
Species	Human	Mouse
Entrez	10804	14623
Ensembl	ENSG00000121742	ENSMUSG00000040055
UniProt	O95452	P70689
RefSeq (mRNA)	NM_006783; NM_001110219; NM_001110220; NM_001110221; NM_001370090 NM_001370091; NM_001370092	NM_001010937; NM_001271663; NM_008128
RefSeq (protein)	NP_001103689; NP_001103690; NP_001103691; NP_006774; NP_001357019 NP_001357020; NP_001357021	NP_001010937; NP_001258592
Location (UCSC)	Chr 13: 20.22 – 20.23 Mb	Chr 14: 57.36 – 57.37 Mb
PubMed search
- Wikidata
View/Edit Human	View/Edit Mouse

Gap junction beta-6 protein (GJB6), also known as connexin 30 (Cx30) — is a protein that in humans is encoded by the GJB6 gene. Connexin 30 (Cx30) is one of several gap junction proteins expressed in the inner ear. Mutations in gap junction genes have been found to lead to both syndromic and nonsyndromic deafness. Mutations in this gene are associated with Clouston syndrome (i.e., hydrotic ectodermal dysplasia).

== Function ==
The connexin gene family codes for the protein subunits of gap junction channels that mediate direct diffusion of ions and metabolites between the cytoplasm of adjacent cells. Connexins span the plasma membrane 4 times, with amino- and carboxy-terminal regions facing the cytoplasm. Connexin genes are expressed in a cell type-specific manner with overlapping specificity. The gap junction channels have unique properties depending on the type of connexins constituting the channel.[supplied by OMIM]

Connexin 30 is prevalent in the two distinct gap junction systems found in the cochlea: the epithelial cell gap junction network, which couple non-sensory epithelial cells, and the connective tissue gap junction network, which couple connective tissue cells. Gap junctions serve the important purpose of recycling potassium ions that pass through hair cells during mechanotransduction back to the endolymph.

Connexin 30 has been found to be co-localized with connexin 26. Cx30 and Cx26 have also been found to form heteromeric and heterotypic channels. The biochemical properties and channel permeabilities of these more complex channels differ from homotypic Cx30 or Cx26 channels. Overexpression of Cx30 in Cx30 null mice restored Cx26 expression and normal gap junction channel functioning and calcium signaling, but it is described that Cx26 expression is altered in Cx30 null mice. The researchers hypothesized that co-regulation of Cx26 and Cx30 is dependent on phospholipase C signaling and the NF-κB pathway.

The cochlea contains two cell types, auditory hair cells for mechanotransduction and supporting cells. Gap junction channels are only found between cochlear supporting cells. While gap junctions in the inner ear are critically involved in potassium recycling to the endolymph, connexin expression in the supporting cells surrounding the organ of Corti have been found to support epithelial tissue lesion repair following loss of sensory hair cells. An experiment with Cx30 null mice found deficits in lesion closure and repair of the organ of Corti following hair cell loss, suggesting that Cx30 has a role in regulating lesion repair response.

Astrocytes play a crucial role in synaptic physiology and information processing in the brain. A key characteristic of astrocytes is their expression of Cx30, which influences cognitive processes by shaping synaptic and network activities. This Cx-mediated astroglial network regulates the efficiency of extracellular potassium (K+) and glutamate clearance at synapses, as well as the long-distance trafficking of energy metabolites to fuel active synapses. However, Cxs do not only form gap junction channels with other astrocytes; they can also mediate direct exchange with the extracellular space when forming hemichannels.

Cx30 protein levels set the size of astrocytic networks, and can be modulated by neuronal activity, indicating a close relationship between astrocytic network size and the activation of underlying neuronal networks. However, this modulation is complex, as it differentially impacts principal cells and interneurons. Additionally, Cx30 can also act via other mechanisms, such as signaling and protein interactions. Recent research has shown that the increase in Cx30 levels between P10 to P50 controls the closure of the critical period in the mouse visual cortex through a signaling pathway that regulates the extracellular matrix and interneuron maturation.

In the hippocampus, decreased Cx30 expression reduces the size of astroglial networks, while upregulation of Cx30 increases their size. In both cases, it decreases spontaneous and evoked synaptic transmission. This effect results from reduced neuronal excitability, leading to alterations in the induction of synaptic plasticity and impairments in learning processes in vivo. Altogether, this suggest that astroglial networks have a physiologically optimized size to appropriately regulate neuronal functions.

== Clinical significance ==
=== Auditory ===
Connexin 26 and connexin 30 are commonly accepted to be the predominant gap junction proteins in the cochlea. Genetic knockout experiments in mice has shown that knockout of either Cx26 or Cx30 produces deafness. However, recent research suggests that Cx30 knockout produces deafness due to subsequent downregulation of Cx26, and one mouse study found that a Cx30 mutation that preserves half of Cx26 expression found in normal Cx30 mice resulted in unimpaired hearing. The lessened severity of Cx30 knockout in comparison to Cx26 knockout is supported by a study examining the time course and patterns of hair cell degeneration in the cochlea. Cx26 null mice displayed more rapid and widespread cell death than Cx30 null mice. The percent hair cell loss was less widespread and frequent in the cochleas of Cx30 null mice.

=== Sleep cycle ===
Connexin 30 (Cx30) appears to play a crucial role in regulating sleep and wakefulness, potentially through its involvement in circadian rhythm generation, response to sleep pressure, and modulation of astrocyte morphology and function.

Research has shown that Cx30 and Connexin 43 (Cx43) exhibit a time-of-day dependent expression in the mouse suprachiasmatic nucleus (SCN), the central circadian rhythm generator. These connexins contribute to the electric coupling of SCN neurons and astrocytic-neuronal signaling that regulates rhythmic SCN neuronal activity.

Interestingly, the fluctuation of Cx30 protein expression strongly depends on the light-dark cycle, which suggests that Cx30 may play a role in the circadian system's light entrainment and circadian rhythm generation.

In a study using Cx30 knockout mice, researchers have found that these mice exhibited a deficit in maintaining wakefulness during periods of high sleep pressure. They needed more stimuli to stay awake during gentle sleep deprivation and showed increased slow-wave sleep during instrumental sleep deprivation.

Moreover, neuronal activity has been found to increase hippocampal Cx30 protein levels via a posttranslational mechanism regulating lysosomal degradation, which translated at the functional level in the activation of Cx30 hemichannels and in Cx30-mediated remodeling of astrocyte morphology independently of gap junction biochemical coupling.

The clinical significance of this finding is that it can explain the mechanism of action of modafinil in its wakefulness-promoting properties. Modafinil may promote wakefulness by modulating the function of astroglial connexins, specifically connexin 30, which are proteins that facilitate intercellular communication and play a role in sleep-wake regulation. Connexins form channels that allow the exchange of ions and signaling molecules between cells. In the brain, they are mainly expressed by astrocytes, which help regulate neuronal activity. Modafinil increases the levels of connexin 30 in the cortex, enhancing communication between astrocytes and promoting wakefulness. Conversely, connexin 30 levels decrease during sleep, contributing to the transition from wakefulness to sleep. Flecainide, a drug that blocks astroglial connexins, can enhance the effects of modafinil on wakefulness and cognition, and reduce narcoleptic episodes in animal models. These findings suggest that modafinil may exert its therapeutic effects by modulating astroglial connexins.
