= TMPRSS3 =

Protein-coding gene in the species Homo sapiens

Identifiers
- Aliases: TMPRSS3, DFNB10, DFNB8, ECHOS1, TADG12, transmembrane protease, serine 3, transmembrane serine protease 3
- External IDs: OMIM: 605511; MGI: 2155445; GeneCards: TMPRSS3

Gene location (Human)
Chr.	Chromosome 21 (human)
Band	21q22.3	Start	42,371,887 bp
Band	21q22.3	End	42,396,091 bp

Gene location (Mouse)
Chr.	Chromosome 17 (mouse)
Band	17|17 A3.3	Start	31,398,239 bp
Band	17|17 A3.3	End	31,417,951 bp
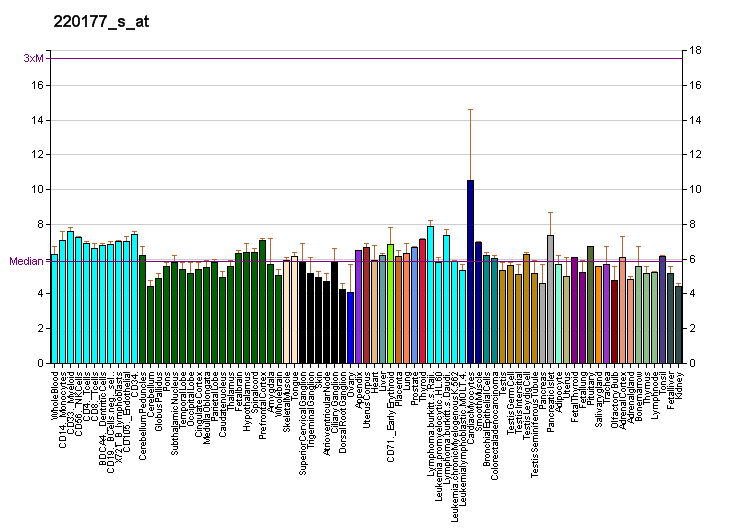
RNA expression pattern
Bgee	Human / Mouse (ortholog); Top expressed in: pancreatic ductal cell; right uterine tube; bronchial epithelial cell; mucosa of paranasal sinus; olfactory zone of nasal mucosa; pylorus; gallbladder; nasal epithelium; epithelium of nasopharynx; germinal epithelium / Top expressed in: vestibular sensory epithelium; utricle; vestibular membrane of cochlear duct; cochlea; granulocyte; submandibular gland; parasympathetic nervous system; thyroid gland; pharynx; tongue; More reference expression data
BioGPS	More reference expression data
Gene ontology
Molecular function	scavenger receptor activity; sodium channel regulator activity; peptidase activity; serine-type peptidase activity; hydrolase activity; serine-type endopeptidase activity
Cellular component	integral component of membrane; soma; endoplasmic reticulum membrane; endoplasmic reticulum; membrane
Biological process	cellular sodium ion homeostasis; hearing; receptor-mediated endocytosis; proteolysis; regulation of molecular function; vesicle-mediated transport; endocytosis
Sources:Amigo / QuickGO
Orthologs
Databases	NCBI: entry; OMA: entry
Species	Human	Mouse
Entrez	64699	140765
Ensembl	ENSG00000160183	ENSMUSG00000024034
UniProt	P57727	Q8K1T0
RefSeq (mRNA)	NM_001256317; NM_024022; NM_032401; NM_032404; NM_032405	NM_001163776; NM_080727
RefSeq (protein)	NP_001243246; NP_076927; NP_115780; NP_115781	NP_001157248; NP_542765
Location (UCSC)	Chr 21: 42.37 – 42.4 Mb	Chr 17: 31.4 – 31.42 Mb
PubMed search
- Wikidata
View/Edit Human	View/Edit Mouse

Transmembrane protease, serine 3 is an enzyme that in humans is encoded by the TMPRSS3 gene.

== Function ==
This gene encodes a member of the serine protease family. The encoded protein contains a serine protease domain, a transmembrane domain, an LDL receptor class A domain, and a scavenger receptor cysteine-rich domain. Serine proteases are known to be involved in a variety of biological processes, whose malfunction often leads to human diseases and disorders. This gene was identified by its association with both congenital and childhood onset autosomal recessive deafness. This gene is expressed in fetal cochlea and many other tissues, and is thought to be involved in the development and maintenance of the inner ear or the contents of the perilymph and endolymph. This gene was also identified as a tumor associated gene that is overexpressed in ovarian tumors. Four alternatively spliced variants have been described, two of which encode identical products.

== See also ==
- Nonsyndromic deafness (DFNB8)
