= Gasdermin-E =

Protein found in humans

GSDME

Identifiers
- Aliases: GSDME, ICERE-1, DFNA5, DFNA5, deafness associated tumor suppressor, gasdermin E
- External IDs: OMIM: 608798; MGI: 1889850; GeneCards: GSDME

Gene location (Human)
Chr.	Chromosome 7 (human)
Band	7p15.3	Start	24,698,355 bp
Band	7p15.3	End	24,757,940 bp

Gene location (Mouse)
Chr.	Chromosome 6 (mouse)
Band	6|6 B2.3	Start	50,165,868 bp
Band	6|6 B2.3	End	50,240,842 bp
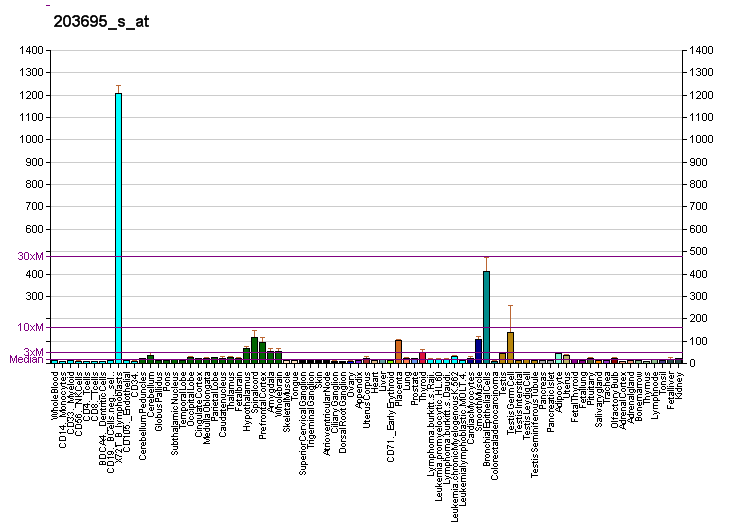
RNA expression pattern
Bgee	Human / Mouse (ortholog); Top expressed in: germinal epithelium; jejunal mucosa; stromal cell of endometrium; endothelial cell; optic nerve; placenta; oocyte; secondary oocyte; middle temporal gyrus; decidua / Top expressed in: pineal gland; mammillary body; temporal muscle; medial ganglionic eminence; triceps brachii muscle; sternocleidomastoid muscle; granulocyte; vastus lateralis muscle; lateral geniculate nucleus; habenula; More reference expression data
BioGPS	More reference expression data
Gene ontology
Molecular function	phosphatidylinositol-4,5-bisphosphate binding; cardiolipin binding
Cellular component	cytoplasm; cytosol; plasma membrane; membrane
Biological process	inner ear receptor cell differentiation; hearing; positive regulation of intrinsic apoptotic signaling pathway; negative regulation of cell population proliferation; programmed cell death; cell death; positive regulation of MAPK cascade; necrotic cell death; pyroptosis; cellular response to tumor necrosis factor; cellular response to virus
Sources:Amigo / QuickGO
Orthologs
Databases	NCBI: entry; OMA: entry
Species	Human	Mouse
Entrez	1687	54722
Ensembl	ENSG00000105928	ENSMUSG00000029821
UniProt	O60443	Q9Z2D3
RefSeq (mRNA)	NM_004403; NM_001127453; NM_001127454	NM_018769
RefSeq (protein)	NP_001120925; NP_001120926; NP_004394; NP_001120926.1	NP_061239
Location (UCSC)	Chr 7: 24.7 – 24.76 Mb	Chr 6: 50.17 – 50.24 Mb
PubMed search
- Wikidata
View/Edit Human	View/Edit Mouse

Gasdermin-E is a protein that in humans is encoded by the GSDME gene (previously DFNA5).

== Function ==
Hearing impairment is a heterogeneous condition with over 40 loci described. The protein encoded by this gene is expressed in fetal cochlea, however, its function is not known. Nonsyndromic hearing impairment is associated with a mutation in this gene.

The observation that DFNA5 is epigenetically inactivated in a large number of cancers of frequent types (gastric, colorectal, and breast) is another important finding and is in line with its apoptosis-inducing properties. Indeed, if apoptosis is an intrinsic feature of DFNA5, shutting the gene down in tumor cells makes them more susceptible to uncontrolled cellular growth. Moreover, the fact that DFNA5 is regulated by P53 strongly suggests that DFNA5 is a tumor suppressor gene.
