= TMC1 =

Protein-coding gene in the species Homo sapiens

Identifiers
- Aliases: TMC1, DFNA36, DFNB11, DFNB7, transmembrane channel like 1
- External IDs: OMIM: 606706; MGI: 2151016; GeneCards: TMC1

Gene location (Human)
Chr.	Chromosome 9 (human)
Band	9q21.13	Start	72,521,608 bp
Band	9q21.13	End	72,838,297 bp

Gene location (Mouse)
Chr.	Chromosome 19 (mouse)
Band	19 B|19 13.98 cM	Start	20,760,822 bp
Band	19 B|19 13.98 cM	End	20,931,566 bp
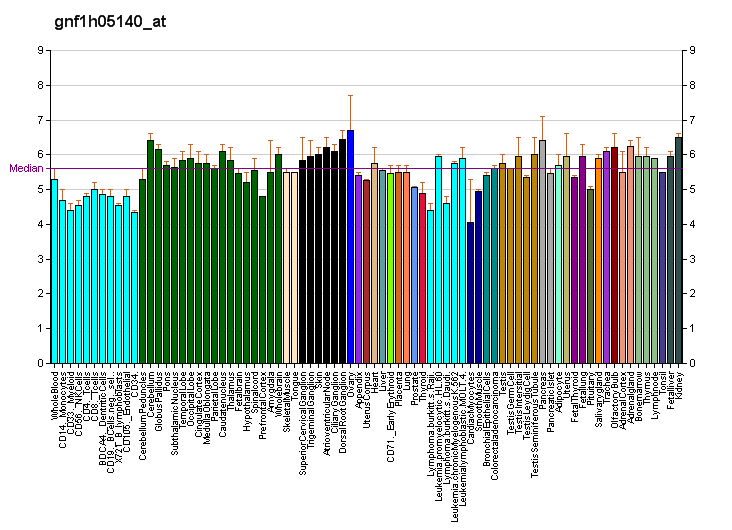

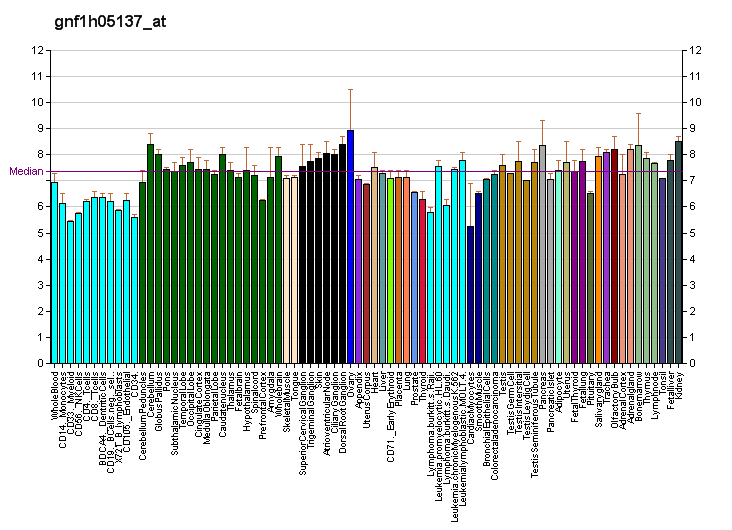
RNA expression pattern
Bgee	Human / Mouse (ortholog); Top expressed in: testicle; buccal mucosa cell; gonad; sural nerve; C1 segment; monocyte; right uterine tube; stromal cell of endometrium; anterior cingulate cortex; gastrocnemius muscle / Top expressed in: spermatid; spermatocyte; Meckel's cartilage; utricle; sphenoid bone; gastrula; ciliary body; lesser wing of sphenoid bone; axial skeleton; basilar part of occipital bone; More reference expression data
BioGPS	More reference expression data
Gene ontology
Molecular function	voltage-gated calcium channel activity; mechanosensitive ion channel activity; ion channel activity
Cellular component	integral component of membrane; stereocilium tip; membrane; external side of plasma membrane; plasma membrane; integral component of plasma membrane
Biological process	vestibular reflex; auditory receptor cell development; ion transport; hearing; calcium ion transmembrane transport; detection of mechanical stimulus involved in sensory perception of sound; regulation of calcium ion transmembrane transport
Sources:Amigo / QuickGO
Orthologs
Databases	NCBI: entry; OMA: entry
Species	Human	Mouse
Entrez	117531	13409
Ensembl	ENSG00000165091	ENSMUSG00000024749
UniProt	Q8TDI8	Q8R4P5
RefSeq (mRNA)	NM_138691	NM_028953
RefSeq (protein)	NP_619636	NP_083229
Location (UCSC)	Chr 9: 72.52 – 72.84 Mb	Chr 19: 20.76 – 20.93 Mb
PubMed search
- Wikidata
View/Edit Human	View/Edit Mouse

Transmembrane channel-like protein 1 is a protein that in humans is encoded by the TMC1 gene. TMC1 contains six transmembrane domains with both the C and N termini on the endoplasmic side of the membrane, as well as a large loop between domains 4 and 5. This topology is similar to that of transient receptor potential channels (TRPs), a family of proteins involved in the perception of senses such as temperature, taste, pressure, and vision. TMC1 has been located in the post-natal mouse cochlea, and knockouts for TMC1 and TMC2 result in both auditory and vestibular deficits (hearing loss and balance issues) indicating TMC1 is a molecular part of auditory transduction.

== Function ==
This gene is considered a member of a gene family predicted to encode transmembrane proteins. Until recently, the specific function of this gene was relatively unknown; it was only known to be required for normal function of cochlear hair cells. However, new research suggests that TMC1 interacts with Tip link proteins protocadherin 15 and cadherin 23 indicating that TMC1, along with TMC2, are necessary proteins for hair cell mechanotransduction. Specifically, TMC1 and TMC2 may be two pore-forming subunits of the channel that responds to tip link deflection in hair cells.

Due to its implication in cochlear hair cell function and its interaction with hair cell tip links, TMC1 is being mutated and manipulated in order to better understand the receptor while at the same time producing a molecular model for deafness. While deafness can arise at any stage of auditory processing, DFNA36 (a type of progressive hearing loss) and DFNB7/B11 (congenital hearing loss) have been specifically shown to arise from TMC1 mutations. DFNA36 results from a dominant missense mutation and DFNB7/B11 results from a recessive mutation. Both have been modeled in mice, known as the Beethoven model and the dn model respectively. The TMC1 gene is located on chromosome 9q31-q21, and the dominant mutation associated with DFNA36 occurs at amino acid 572 which suggests the importance of this amino acid in the overall function of TMC1. Now that TMC1 has been shown to interact with the tip link proteins PCDH15 and CDH23, the next question may be whether or not amino acid 572 is necessary for TMC1 tip link interactions.

Researchers reported in 2015 that genetically deaf mice treated with TMC1 gene therapy recovered some of their hearing.

== Clinical significance ==
Mutations in this gene have been associated with progressive postlingual hearing loss, non syndromic deafness and profound prelingual deafness. TMC1 mutations are not associated with other symptoms or abnormalities, which is known as Nonsyndromic hearing loss and indicates that TMC1 functions mainly in auditory sensation. Additionally, recessive mutations of the gene result in both a loss of TMC1 function as well as profound deafness indicating TMC1 function is necessary for the processing of auditory signals.
