= CLDN14 =

Protein-coding gene in humans

Identifiers
- Aliases: CLDN14, DFNB29, claudin 14
- External IDs: OMIM: 605608; MGI: 1860425; GeneCards: CLDN14

Gene location (Human)
Chr.	Chromosome 21 (human)
Band	21q22.13	Start	36,460,621 bp
Band	21q22.13	End	36,576,569 bp

Gene location (Mouse)
Chr.	Chromosome 16 (mouse)
Band	16|16 C4	Start	93,715,919 bp
Band	16|16 C4	End	93,809,696 bp
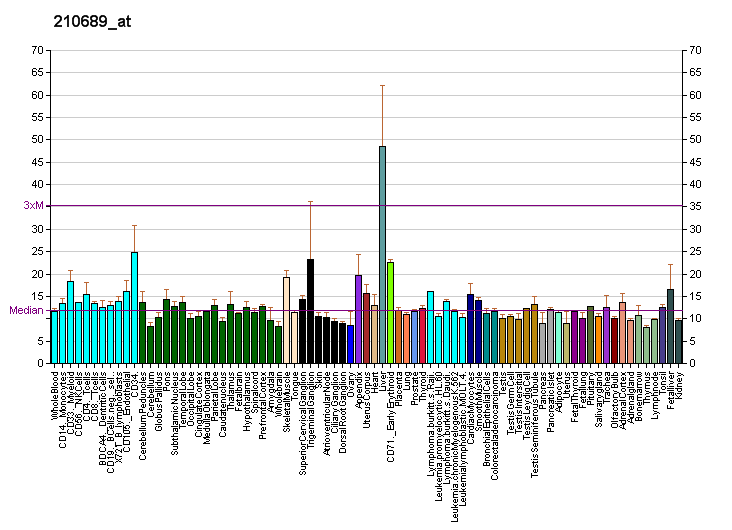
RNA expression pattern
Bgee	Human / Mouse (ortholog); Top expressed in: right lobe of liver; testicle; buccal mucosa cell; human kidney; kidney tubule; cartilage tissue; body of pancreas; renal medulla; gallbladder; lower lobe of lung / Top expressed in: lumbar subsegment of spinal cord; hepatobiliary system; liver; left lobe of liver; embryo; hair follicle; parasympathetic nervous system; thyroid gland; secondary oocyte; sciatic nerve; More reference expression data
BioGPS	More reference expression data
Gene ontology
Molecular function	structural molecule activity; identical protein binding
Cellular component	integral component of membrane; cell junction; plasma membrane; endoplasmic reticulum; membrane; bicellular tight junction
Biological process	calcium-independent cell-cell adhesion via plasma membrane cell-adhesion molecules; protein-containing complex assembly
Sources:Amigo / QuickGO
Orthologs
Databases	NCBI: entry; OMA: entry
Species	Human	Mouse
Entrez	23562	56173
Ensembl	ENSG00000159261	ENSMUSG00000047109
UniProt	O95500	Q9Z0S3
RefSeq (mRNA)	NM_001146077; NM_001146078; NM_001146079; NM_012130; NM_144492	NM_001165925; NM_001165926; NM_019500
RefSeq (protein)	NP_001139549; NP_001139550; NP_001139551; NP_036262; NP_652763	NP_001159397; NP_001159398; NP_062373
Location (UCSC)	Chr 21: 36.46 – 36.58 Mb	Chr 16: 93.72 – 93.81 Mb
PubMed search
- Wikidata
View/Edit Human	View/Edit Mouse

Claudin-14 is a protein that in humans is encoded by the CLDN14 gene. It belongs to a related family of proteins called claudins.

The protein encoded by CLDN14 is an integral membrane protein and a component of tight junctions, one mode of cell-to-cell adhesion in epithelial or endothelial cell sheets. Tight junctions form continuous seals around cells and serve as a physical barrier to prevent solutes and water from passing freely through the paracellular space.

These junctions are composed of sets of continuous networking protein strands in the outer surface of the cell membrane, with complementary grooves in the inwardly facing extracytoplasmic leaflet. The CLDN14 protein also binds to WW domain of Yes-associated protein.

Defects in CLDN14 are the cause of an autosomal recessive form of nonsyndromic sensorineural deafness. Two transcript variants encoding the same protein have been found for this gene.

There are also suggestions that CLDN14 plays a role in tumour angiogenesis (blood vessel formation), as deletion of a single copy of this gene leads to tight junction defects and leaky blood vessels in a mouse model.

Polymorphisms in CLDN14 are associated with kidney stone risk. It is likely that additional roles for claudins in the pathogenesis of other types of kidney diseases have yet to be uncovered.

== See also ==
- Nonsyndromic deafness (DFNB29)
