= PLAT domain =

PLAT/LH2 domain
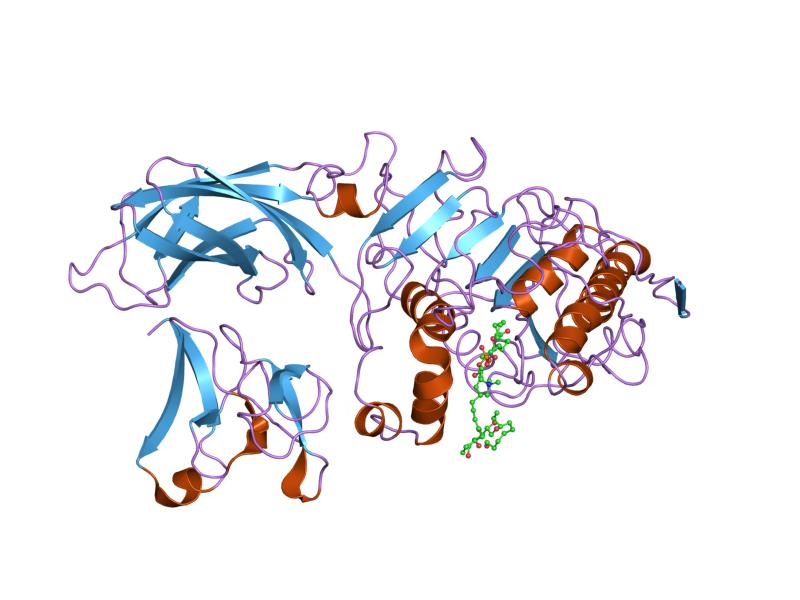
- Structure of the lipase-procolipase complex.

Identifiers
- Symbol: PLAT
- Pfam: PF01477
- InterPro: IPR001024
- SMART: SM00308
- PROSITE: PDOC50095
- SCOP2: 1lpa / SCOPe / SUPFAM
- OPM superfamily: 221
- OPM protein: 3swz
- CDD: cd00113
Available protein structures:
- PDB: IPR001024 PF01477 (ECOD; PDBsum)
- AlphaFold: IPR001024; PF01477

In molecular biology the PLAT domain is a protein domain that is found in a variety of membrane or lipid associated proteins. It is called the PLAT (Polycystin-1, Lipoxygenase, Alpha-Toxin) domain or LH2 (Lipoxygenase homology) domain. The known structure of pancreatic lipase shows this domain binds to procolipase Pfam PF01114, which mediates membrane association.

This domain forms a beta-sandwich composed of two β-sheets of four β-strands each.

== Human proteins containing this domain ==
ALOX12; ALOX12B; ALOX12P2; ALOX15; ALOX15B; ALOX5; ALOXE3; LIPC; LIPG; LOXHD1; LPL; PKD1; PKD1L1; PKD1L2; PKD1L3; PKDREJ; PNLIP; PNLIPRP1; PNLIPRP2; PNLIPRP3; RAB6IP1;
