= LOXHD1 =

Protein-coding gene in the species Homo sapiens

Identifiers
- Aliases: LOXHD1, DFNB77, LH2D1, lipoxygenase homology domains 1, lipoxygenase homology PLAT domains 1
- External IDs: OMIM: 613072; MGI: 1914609; HomoloGene: 16947; GeneCards: LOXHD1; OMA:LOXHD1 - orthologs

Gene location (Human)
Chr.	Chromosome 18 (human)
Band	18q21.1	Start	46,476,972 bp
Band	18q21.1	End	46,657,220 bp

Gene location (Mouse)
Chr.	Chromosome 18 (mouse)
Band	18|18 E3	Start	77,369,654 bp
Band	18|18 E3	End	77,530,626 bp
RNA expression pattern
Bgee	Human / Mouse (ortholog); Top expressed in: left testis; right testis; sperm; testicle; gonad; bone marrow cell; monocyte; blood; apex of heart; pituitary gland / Top expressed in: spermatocyte; testicle; spermatid; More reference expression data
BioGPS	n/a
Gene ontology
Molecular function	calcium channel activity; catalase activity; heme binding
Cellular component	cell projection; membrane; stereocilium
Biological process	hearing; detection of mechanical stimulus; calcium ion transmembrane transport; cellular oxidant detoxification
Sources:Amigo / QuickGO
Orthologs
Species	Human	Mouse
Entrez	125336	240411
Ensembl	ENSG00000167210	ENSMUSG00000032818
UniProt	Q8IVV2	C8YR32
RefSeq (mRNA)	NM_001145472; NM_001145473; NM_001173129; NM_001308013; NM_144612 NM_001384474	NM_172834
RefSeq (protein)	NP_001138944; NP_001138945; NP_001166600; NP_001294942; NP_653213	NP_766422
Location (UCSC)	Chr 18: 46.48 – 46.66 Mb	Chr 18: 77.37 – 77.53 Mb
PubMed search
- Wikidata
View/Edit Human	View/Edit Mouse

Lipoxygenase homology domains 1 is a protein in humans that is encoded by the LOXHD1 gene.

== Function ==
This gene encodes a highly conserved protein consisting entirely of PLAT (polycystin/lipoxygenase/alpha-toxin) domains, thought to be involved in targeting proteins to the plasma membrane. Studies in mice show that this gene is expressed in the mechanosensory hair cells in the inner ear, and mutations in this gene lead to auditory defects, indicating that this gene is essential for normal hair cell function. Screening of human families segregating deafness identified a mutation in this gene which causes DFNB77, a progressive form of autosomal-recessive nonsyndromic hearing loss (ARNSHL). Alternatively spliced transcript variants encoding different isoforms have been noted for this gene.
