= STRC =

Protein-coding gene in the species Homo sapiens

Identifiers
- Aliases: STRC, DFNB16, stereocilin
- External IDs: OMIM: 606440; MGI: 2153816; GeneCards: STRC

Gene location (Human)
Chr.	Chromosome 15 (human)
Band	15q15.3	Start	43,599,563 bp
Band	15q15.3	End	43,618,800 bp

Gene location (Mouse)
Chr.	Chromosome 2 (mouse)
Band	2|2 E5	Start	121,194,209 bp
Band	2|2 E5	End	121,217,649 bp
RNA expression pattern
Bgee	Human / Mouse (ortholog); Top expressed in: right hemisphere of cerebellum; right frontal lobe; right testis; left testis; primary visual cortex; Brodmann area 9; middle temporal gyrus; Brodmann area 23; endothelial cell; anterior cingulate cortex / Top expressed in: utricle; vestibular sensory epithelium; vestibular membrane of cochlear duct; blastocyst; superior frontal gyrus; cochlea; esophagus; stomach; brain stem; midbrain tegmentum; More reference expression data
BioGPS	n/a
Orthologs
Databases	NCBI: entry; OMA: entry
Species	Human	Mouse
Entrez	161497	140476
Ensembl	ENSG00000242866	ENSMUSG00000033498
UniProt	Q7RTU9	Q8VIM6
RefSeq (mRNA)	NM_153700	NM_080459
RefSeq (protein)	NP_714544	NP_536707
Location (UCSC)	Chr 15: 43.6 – 43.62 Mb	Chr 2: 121.19 – 121.22 Mb
PubMed search
- Wikidata
View/Edit Human	View/Edit Mouse

Stereocilin is a protein that in humans is encoded by the STRC gene.

The STRC gene provides instructions for creating a protein called stereocilin, named for its location outside the stereocilia cells in the inner ear. This protein is associated with the hair bundle of the sensory hair cells in the inner ear. The hair bundle is composed of stiff microvilli called stereocilia and is involved with mechanoreception of sound waves. Stereocilia cells generate an electrical response to the vibrations of sound waves, crucial for normal hearing.

This gene is part of a tandem duplication on chromosome 15; the second copy is a pseudogene. Impairment of the STRC gene leads to the production of a non-functional stereocilin or prevents its production altogether. Consequently, this results in instability in the structure of stereocilia, hindering their optimal response to the passage of sound waves. In the end, the hair cells fail to convert sound waves into electrical potentials, causing hearing impairment. Hence, mutations in this gene cause autosomal recessive non-syndromic deafness.

Mutations in STRC is the most common cause of moderate bilateral hearing loss, accounting for approximately 30% of cases. The prevalence of hearing loss due to alterations in the STRC gene is estimated at 1 in 1600.

99% of the genetic alterations in the STRC gene associated with non-syndromic hearing loss involve large copy number variations. Often, the alteration is a large deletion on chromosome 15, including several genes, among them STRC. In some cases, this deletion includes the CATSPER2 gene, which can lead to fertility issues in males.
