= TECTA =

Protein-coding gene in the species Homo sapiens

Identifiers
- Aliases: TECTA, DFNA12, DFNA8, DFNB21, tectorin alpha
- External IDs: OMIM: 602574; MGI: 109575; HomoloGene: 3955; GeneCards: TECTA; OMA:TECTA - orthologs

Gene location (Human)
Chr.	Chromosome 11 (human)
Band	11q23.3	Start	121,101,243 bp
Band	11q23.3	End	121,191,490 bp

Gene location (Mouse)
Chr.	Chromosome 9 (mouse)
Band	9 A5.1|9 23.63 cM	Start	42,240,915 bp
Band	9 A5.1|9 23.63 cM	End	42,311,225 bp
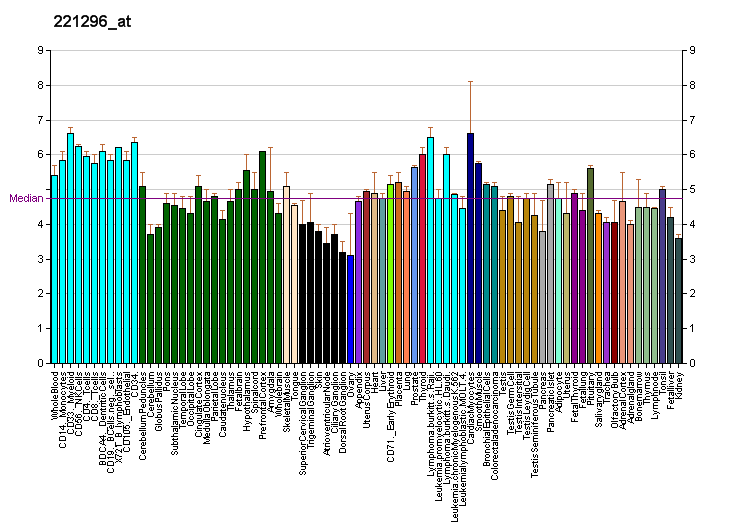
RNA expression pattern
Bgee	Human / Mouse (ortholog); Top expressed in: oocyte; secondary oocyte; testicle; parietal lobe; postcentral gyrus; superior frontal gyrus; superior vestibular nucleus; pons; Brodmann area 23; ventricular zone / Top expressed in: vestibular sensory epithelium; utricle; saccule; lumbar spinal ganglion; epithelium of macula of saccule of membranous labyrinth; petrous part of the temporal bone; cochlea; epithelium of macula of utricle of membranous labyrinth; embryo; entorhinal cortex; More reference expression data
BioGPS	More reference expression data
Gene ontology
Molecular function	extracellular matrix structural constituent
Cellular component	anchored component of membrane; extracellular exosome; membrane; extracellular region; plasma membrane; extracellular matrix; collagen-containing extracellular matrix
Biological process	cell-matrix adhesion; hearing; C-terminal protein lipidation
Sources:Amigo / QuickGO
Orthologs
Species	Human	Mouse
Entrez	7007	21683
Ensembl	ENSG00000109927	ENSMUSG00000037705
UniProt	O75443	O08523
RefSeq (mRNA)	NM_005422	NM_009347; NM_001324548; NM_001378602
RefSeq (protein)	NP_005413	NP_001311477; NP_033373; NP_001365531
Location (UCSC)	Chr 11: 121.1 – 121.19 Mb	Chr 9: 42.24 – 42.31 Mb
PubMed search
- Wikidata
View/Edit Human	View/Edit Mouse

Alpha-tectorin is a protein that in humans is encoded by the TECTA gene.

The tectorial membrane is an apical extracellular matrix (aECM) of the inner ear that contacts the stereocilia bundles of specialized sensory hair cells. Sound induces movement of these hair cells relative to the tectorial membrane, deflects the stereocilia, and leads to fluctuations in hair-cell membrane potential, transducing sound into electrical signals. Alpha-tectorin is one of the major noncollagenous components of the tectorial membrane. Mutations in the TECTA gene have been shown to be responsible for autosomal dominant nonsyndromic hearing impairment and a recessive form of sensorineural pre-lingual non-syndromic deafness.
