= PKD1L1 =

Protein-coding gene in the species Homo sapiens

Identifiers
- Aliases: PKD1L1, PRO19563, polycystin 1 like 1, transient receptor potential channel interacting, HTX8
- External IDs: OMIM: 609721; MGI: 2156538; HomoloGene: 51376; GeneCards: PKD1L1; OMA:PKD1L1 - orthologs

Gene location (Human)
Chr.	Chromosome 7 (human)
Band	7p12.3	Start	47,740,202 bp
Band	7p12.3	End	47,948,466 bp
RNA expression pattern
Bgee	Human / Mouse (ortholog); Top expressed in: testicle; apex of heart; gonad; left ventricle; left testis; muscle of thigh; epithelium of colon; right testis; gastrocnemius muscle; right auricle of heart / n/a; More reference expression data
BioGPS	n/a
Gene ontology
Molecular function	protein binding; calcium channel activity
Cellular component	integral component of membrane; plasma membrane; cell projection; cilium; calcium channel complex; membrane; ciliary membrane; non-motile cilium
Biological process	ion transport; detection of nodal flow; detection of mechanical stimulus; calcium ion transmembrane transport; left/right axis specification; calcium ion transport; cell-cell adhesion
Sources:Amigo / QuickGO
Orthologs
Species	Human	Mouse
Entrez	168507	171395
Ensembl	ENSG00000158683	n/a
UniProt	Q8TDX9	n/a
RefSeq (mRNA)	NM_138295	XM_036157131
RefSeq (protein)	NP_612152	n/a
Location (UCSC)	Chr 7: 47.74 – 47.95 Mb	n/a
PubMed search
- Wikidata
View/Edit Human	View/Edit Mouse

Polycystin 1 like 1, transient receptor potential channel interacting is a protein that in humans is encoded by the PKD1L1 gene.

== Function ==
This gene encodes a member of the polycystin protein family containing 11 transmembrane domains, a receptor for egg jelly (REJ) domain, and a polycystin-1, lipoxygenase, alpha-toxin (PLAT) domain. The encoded protein may play a role in the male reproductive system. Alternative splice variants have been described but their biological nature has not been determined. [provided by RefSeq, Jul 2008].
