= POU3F4 =

Protein-coding gene in the species Homo sapiens

Identifiers
- Aliases: POU3F4, BRAIN-4, BRN-4, BRN4, DFN3, DFNX2, OCT-9, OTF-9, OTF9, POU class 3 homeobox 4
- External IDs: OMIM: 300039; MGI: 101894; GeneCards: POU3F4

Gene location (Human)
Chr.	X chromosome (human)
Band	Xq21.1	Start	83,508,290 bp
Band	Xq21.1	End	83,512,127 bp

Gene location (Mouse)
Chr.	X chromosome (mouse)
Band	X E1|X 48.2 cM	Start	109,857,886 bp
Band	X E1|X 48.2 cM	End	109,860,813 bp
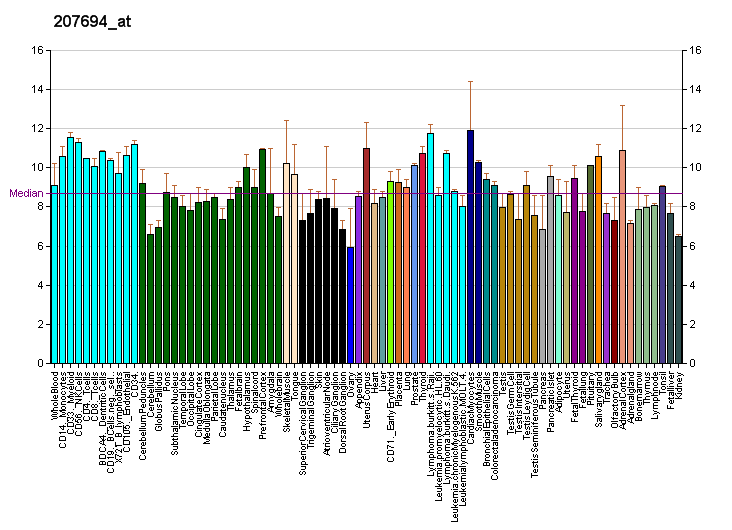
RNA expression pattern
Bgee	Human / Mouse (ortholog); Top expressed in: ganglionic eminence; ventricular zone; nucleus accumbens; caudate nucleus; putamen; cingulate gyrus; amygdala; anterior cingulate cortex; prefrontal cortex; hypothalamus / Top expressed in: Rostral migratory stream; medial ganglionic eminence; vestibular sensory epithelium; utricle; stria vascularis; vestibular membrane of cochlear duct; lumbar subsegment of spinal cord; hair; ventricular zone; cochlea; More reference expression data
BioGPS	More reference expression data
Gene ontology
Molecular function	DNA-binding transcription factor activity; DNA binding; sequence-specific DNA binding; double-stranded DNA binding; RNA polymerase II transcription regulatory region sequence-specific DNA binding; minor groove of adenine-thymine-rich DNA binding; protein binding; DNA-binding transcription factor activity, RNA polymerase II-specific
Cellular component	intracellular anatomical structure; nucleus
Biological process	regulation of transcription by RNA polymerase II; negative regulation of mesenchymal cell apoptotic process; inner ear development; brain development; regulation of transcription, DNA-templated; transcription by RNA polymerase II; hearing; cochlea morphogenesis; transcription, DNA-templated; forebrain neuron differentiation
Sources:Amigo / QuickGO
Orthologs
Databases	NCBI: entry; OMA: entry
Species	Human	Mouse
Entrez	5456	18994
Ensembl	ENSG00000196767	ENSMUSG00000056854
UniProt	P49335	P62515
RefSeq (mRNA)	NM_000307	NM_008901
RefSeq (protein)	NP_000298	NP_032927
Location (UCSC)	Chr X: 83.51 – 83.51 Mb	Chr X: 109.86 – 109.86 Mb
PubMed search
- Wikidata
View/Edit Human	View/Edit Mouse

POU domain, class 3, transcription factor 4 is a protein that in humans is encoded by the POU3F4 gene found on the X chromosome.

POU3F4 is involved in the patterning of the neural tube and both the paraventricular and supraoptic nuclei of the hypothalamus in the developing embryo. During development, POU3F4 is also expressed in the mesenchyme of the periotic bone surrounding the inner ear. A “knockout” mice model displayed that alteration to the POU3F4 gene interrupted this mesenchymal cell differentiation in the superior semicircular canal. The deformities observed in mice were similar to those in humans with X-linked non-syndromic deafness (DFN-3).

== Clinical significance ==
Genetic testing on various persons has confirmed that mutations of the POU3F4 gene cause X-linked non-syndromic deafness (DFN-3). These known mutations include:

- Missense mutation causing the substitution of amino acid glycine for glutamic acid at position 216
- A deletion of the POU3F4 gene and 530 more kilobases upstream
- An amino acid substitution of serine for leucine (S228L) in POU3F4
- Frameshift truncation and extension mutations at the POU3F4 C-terminus

Physical anomalies caused by POU3F4 mutations that have been recognized by high resolution computed tomography (HRCT) and magnetic resonance imaging (MRI) include absence of the central axis of the cochlea, an abnormally wide lateral internal auditory canal and a thickened stapes footplate. These anomalies are associated with X-linked non-syndromic deafness.
