= Myosin-IIIa =

Protein-coding gene in the species Homo sapiens

MYO3A

Identifiers
- Aliases: MYO3A, myosin IIIA, DFNB30
- External IDs: OMIM: 606808; MGI: 2183924; GeneCards: MYO3A
Enzyme activity
EC #	BRENDA	ExPASy	KEGG	MetaCyc
2.7.11.1	↗	↗	↗	↗

Gene location (Human)
Chr.	Chromosome 10 (human)
Band	10p12.1	Start	25,934,229 bp
Band	10p12.1	End	26,212,532 bp

Gene location (Mouse)
Chr.	Chromosome 2 (mouse)
Band	2|2 A3	Start	22,232,314 bp
Band	2|2 A3	End	22,508,264 bp
RNA expression pattern
Bgee	Human / Mouse (ortholog); Top expressed in: islet of Langerhans; testicle; gonad; sperm; ventricular zone; right testis; left testis; ganglionic eminence; epithelium of colon; popliteal artery / Top expressed in: morula; embryo; embryo; zygote; secondary oocyte; tail of embryo; blastocyst; spermatid; duodenum; superior frontal gyrus; More reference expression data
BioGPS	n/a
Gene ontology
Molecular function	transferase activity; protein kinase activity; nucleotide binding; ADP binding; calmodulin binding; kinase activity; microfilament motor activity; protein serine/threonine kinase activity; plus-end directed microfilament motor activity; actin binding; cytoskeletal motor activity; ATP binding; protein binding
Cellular component	filamentous actin; filopodium; cytoskeleton; myosin complex; cytoplasm; stereocilium tip; stereocilium; filopodium tip; cell projection
Biological process	phosphorylation; response to stimulus; protein phosphorylation; protein autophosphorylation; visual perception; hearing; cochlea morphogenesis
Sources:Amigo / QuickGO
Orthologs
Databases	NCBI: entry; OMA: entry
Species	Human	Mouse
Entrez	53904	667663
Ensembl	ENSG00000095777	ENSMUSG00000025716
UniProt	Q8NEV4	Q8K3H5
RefSeq (mRNA)	NM_017433; NM_001368265	NM_148413
RefSeq (protein)	NP_059129; NP_001355194	n/a
Location (UCSC)	Chr 10: 25.93 – 26.21 Mb	Chr 2: 22.23 – 22.51 Mb
PubMed search
- Wikidata
View/Edit Human	View/Edit Mouse

Myosin-IIIa is a protein that in humans is encoded by the MYO3A gene.

The protein encoded by this gene belongs to the myosin superfamily. Myosins are actin-dependent motor proteins and are categorized into conventional myosins (class II) and unconventional myosins (classes I and III through XV) based on their variable C-terminal cargo-binding domains. Class III myosins, such as this one, have a kinase domain N-terminal to the conserved N-terminal motor domains and are expressed in photoreceptors. The protein encoded by this gene plays an important role in hearing in humans. Three different recessive, loss of function mutations in the encoded protein have been shown to cause nonsyndromic progressive hearing loss. Expression of this gene is highly restricted, with the strongest expression in retina and cochlea.
