= TRIOBP =

Protein-coding gene in the species Homo sapiens

Identifiers
- Aliases: TRIOBP, DFNB28, TAP68, TARA, dJ37E16.4, HRIHFB2122, TRIO and F-actin binding protein
- External IDs: OMIM: 609761; MGI: 1349410; GeneCards: TRIOBP

Gene location (Human)
Chr.	Chromosome 22 (human)
Band	22q13.1	Start	37,697,048 bp
Band	22q13.1	End	37,776,556 bp

Gene location (Mouse)
Chr.	Chromosome 15 (mouse)
Band	15 E1|15 37.7 cM	Start	78,831,924 bp
Band	15 E1|15 37.7 cM	End	78,890,069 bp
RNA expression pattern
Bgee	Human / Mouse (ortholog); Top expressed in: lower lobe of lung; apex of heart; right ventricle; stromal cell of endometrium; tail of epididymis; tendon of biceps brachii; left uterine tube; ectocervix; canal of the cervix; right coronary artery / Top expressed in: zygote; granulocyte; genital tubercle; tail of embryo; tibiofemoral joint; secondary oocyte; triceps brachii muscle; external carotid artery; lip; ventricular zone; More reference expression data
BioGPS	n/a
Gene ontology
Molecular function	actin filament binding; actin binding; ubiquitin protein ligase binding; myosin II binding
Cellular component	focal adhesion; microtubule organizing center; nucleus; cytoskeleton; midbody; actin cytoskeleton; cytoplasm
Biological process	barbed-end actin filament capping; regulation of actin cytoskeleton organization; cell cycle; cell division; positive regulation of substrate adhesion-dependent cell spreading; actin modification; hearing; auditory receptor cell stereocilium organization
Sources:Amigo / QuickGO
Orthologs
Databases	NCBI: entry; OMA: entry
Species	Human	Mouse
Entrez	11078	110253
Ensembl	ENSG00000100106	ENSMUSG00000033088
UniProt	Q9H2D6	Q99KW3
RefSeq (mRNA)	NM_138632; NM_001039141; NM_007032	NM_001024716; NM_001039155; NM_001039156; NM_138579
RefSeq (protein)	NP_001034230; NP_008963; NP_619538	NP_001019887; NP_001034244; NP_001034245; NP_613045
Location (UCSC)	Chr 22: 37.7 – 37.78 Mb	Chr 15: 78.83 – 78.89 Mb
PubMed search
- Wikidata
View/Edit Human	View/Edit Mouse

TRIO and F-actin-binding protein is a protein that in humans is encoded by the TRIOBP gene.

This gene encodes a protein that interacts with Trio, which is involved with neural tissue development and in controlling actin cytoskeleton organization, cell motility, and cell growth. This trio-binding protein also associates with F-actin and stabilizes F-actin structures. Domains contained in this encoded protein are an N-terminal pleckstrin homology domain and a C-terminal coiled-coil region. Mutations in this gene have been associated with a form of autosomal-recessive nonsyndromic deafness. Multiple alternatively-spliced transcript variants that would encode different isoforms have been found for this gene, though some transcripts may be subject to nonsense-mediated decay (NMD).
