= GRXCR1 =

Protein-coding gene in the species Homo sapiens

Identifiers
- Aliases: GRXCR1, DFNB25, PPP1R88, glutaredoxin and cysteine rich domain containing 1
- External IDs: OMIM: 613283; MGI: 3577767; GeneCards: GRXCR1

Gene location (Human)
Chr.	Chromosome 4 (human)
Band	4p13	Start	42,892,713 bp
Band	4p13	End	43,030,658 bp

Gene location (Mouse)
Chr.	Chromosome 5 (mouse)
Band	5 C3.1|5 36.59 cM	Start	68,189,178 bp
Band	5 C3.1|5 36.59 cM	End	68,323,741 bp
RNA expression pattern
Bgee	Human / Mouse (ortholog); Top expressed in: testicle; gonad; right frontal lobe; anterior cingulate cortex; prostate / Top expressed in: endolymphatic duct; vestibular labyrinth; utricle; blastocyst; testicle; neural tube; More reference expression data
BioGPS	n/a
Gene ontology
Molecular function	protein-disulfide reductase activity; electron transfer activity; molecular function
Cellular component	cell projection; stereocilium; cilium; kinocilium; microvillus
Biological process	inner ear receptor cell development; negative regulation of phosphatase activity; inner ear receptor cell stereocilium organization; hearing; vestibular receptor cell development; cell redox homeostasis; electron transport chain
Sources:Amigo / QuickGO
Orthologs
Databases	NCBI: entry; OMA: entry
Species	Human	Mouse
Entrez	389207	433899
Ensembl	ENSG00000215203	ENSMUSG00000068082
UniProt	A8MXD5	Q50H32
RefSeq (mRNA)	NM_001080476	NM_001018019
RefSeq (protein)	NP_001073945	NP_001018019
Location (UCSC)	Chr 4: 42.89 – 43.03 Mb	Chr 5: 68.19 – 68.32 Mb
PubMed search
- Wikidata
View/Edit Human	View/Edit Mouse

Glutaredoxin domain-containing cysteine-rich protein 1 is a protein that in humans is encoded by the GRXCR1 gene.

This gene is one of 60 loci associated with autosomal-recessive nonsyndromic hearing impairment. This gene encodes a protein which contains GRX-like domains; these domains play a role in the S-glutathionylation of proteins and may be involved in actin organization in hair cells.

== Model organisms ==
tasmanian devil mouse phenotype
Characteristic	Phenotype
Homozygote viability	Normal
Fertility	Normal
Body weight	Abnormal
Anxiety	Abnormal
Neurological assessment	Abnormal
Grip strength	Abnormal
Hot plate	Normal
Dysmorphology	Normal
Indirect calorimetry	Abnormal
Glucose tolerance test	Abnormal
Auditory brainstem response	Abnormal
DEXA	Abnormal
Radiography	Normal
Body temperature	Abnormal
Eye morphology	Normal
Clinical chemistry	Abnormal
Plasma immunoglobulins	Abnormal
Haematology	Abnormal
Peripheral blood lymphocytes	Abnormal
Micronucleus test	Normal
Heart weight	Normal
Tail epidermis wholemount	Normal
Skin Histopathology	Normal
Brain histopathology	Normal
All tests and analysis from

Model organisms have been used in the study of GRXCR1 function. A mutant mouse line, called tasmanian devil (Grxcr1^{tde}) was generated. Male and female animals underwent a standardized phenotypic screen to determine the effects of deletion. Twenty four tests were carried out on mutant mice and thirteen significant abnormalities were observed. Homozygous mutant animals of both sex displayed decreased body weights, grip strength, body fat, body length and plasma immunoglobulins, abnormal open field test and modified SHIRPA behaviour, and severe hearing impairment at 13 weeks. Male homozygous mutant animals additionally showed abnormal indirect calorimetry and clinical chemistry parameters, improved glucose tolerance and a decreased leukocyte cell number. Female homozygotes also had an increased response to stress-induced hyperthermia and a significantly reduced monocyte percentage.
