= Pejvakin =

Protein encoded by the PJVK gene

PJVK

Identifiers
- Aliases: PJVK, DFNB59, deafness, autosomal recessive 59, pejvakin
- External IDs: OMIM: 610219; MGI: 2685847; GeneCards: PJVK

Gene location (Human)
Chr.	Chromosome 2 (human)
Band	2q31.2	Start	178,451,346 bp
Band	2q31.2	End	178,462,102 bp

Gene location (Mouse)
Chr.	Chromosome 2 (mouse)
Band	2|2 C3	Start	76,478,820 bp
Band	2|2 C3	End	76,488,900 bp
RNA expression pattern
Bgee	Human / Mouse (ortholog); Top expressed in: sperm; right testis; left testis; left ovary; anterior pituitary; right ovary; right lobe of liver; Brodmann area 9; C1 segment; left lobe of thyroid gland / Top expressed in: embryo; embryo; proximal tubule; genital tubercle; ventricular zone; tail of embryo; islet of Langerhans; mesencephalon; right kidney; human kidney; More reference expression data
BioGPS	n/a
Orthologs
Databases	NCBI: entry; OMA: entry
Species	Human	Mouse
Entrez	494513	381375
Ensembl	ENSG00000204311	ENSMUSG00000075267
UniProt	Q0ZLH3	Q0ZLH2
RefSeq (mRNA)	NM_001042702; NM_001353775; NM_001353776; NM_001353777; NM_001353778 NM_001369912	NM_001080711
RefSeq (protein)	NP_001036167; NP_001340704; NP_001340705; NP_001340706; NP_001340707 NP_001356841	NP_001074180
Location (UCSC)	Chr 2: 178.45 – 178.46 Mb	Chr 2: 76.48 – 76.49 Mb
PubMed search
- Wikidata
View/Edit Human	View/Edit Mouse

Pejvakin is a protein that in humans is encoded by the PJVK gene.

== Function ==
The protein encoded by this gene is a member of the gasdermin family, a family which is found only in vertebrates. The encoded protein is required for the proper function of auditory pathway neurons. Defects in this gene are a cause of non-syndromic sensorineural deafness autosomal recessive type 59 (DFNB59). [provided by RefSeq, Dec 2008].
