= Calcium binding protein 2 =

Protein found in humans

CABP2

Identifiers
- Aliases: CABP2, DFNB93, calcium binding protein 2
- External IDs: OMIM: 607314; MGI: 1352749; GeneCards: CABP2

Gene location (Human)
Chr.	Chromosome 11 (human)
Band	11q13.2	Start	67,518,912 bp
Band	11q13.2	End	67,524,517 bp

Gene location (Mouse)
Chr.	Chromosome 19 (mouse)
Band	19|19 A	Start	4,131,578 bp
Band	19|19 A	End	4,137,340 bp
RNA expression pattern
Bgee	Human / Mouse (ortholog); Top expressed in: gonad; mucosa of transverse colon; gland; ventricle of the heart; left ventricle; endocrine system; endocrine gland; vasculature; blood vessel; great vessels / Top expressed in: neural layer of retina; pancreas; embryo; islet of Langerhans; proximal tubule; human kidney; right kidney; cerebellar cortex; stomach; zygote; More reference expression data
BioGPS	n/a
Gene ontology
Molecular function	calcium ion binding; metal ion binding; calcium channel regulator activity
Cellular component	cytoplasm; perinuclear region of cytoplasm; plasma membrane; Golgi apparatus; membrane
Biological process	signal transduction; visual perception; hearing; response to stimulus
Sources:Amigo / QuickGO
Orthologs
Databases	NCBI: entry; OMA: entry
Species	Human	Mouse
Entrez	51475	29866
Ensembl	ENSG00000167791	ENSMUSG00000024857
UniProt	Q9NPB3	Q9JLK4
RefSeq (mRNA)	NM_016366; NM_031204; NM_001318496	NM_001160252; NM_001160253; NM_013878
RefSeq (protein)	NP_001305425; NP_057450	NP_001153724; NP_001153725; NP_038906
Location (UCSC)	Chr 11: 67.52 – 67.52 Mb	Chr 19: 4.13 – 4.14 Mb
PubMed search
- Wikidata
View/Edit Human	View/Edit Mouse

Calcium binding protein 2, also known as CaBP2, is a protein that in humans is encoded by the CABP2 gene.

CaBP2 contain a consensus sequence for N-terminal myristoylation, akin to members of the recoverin subfamily, and undergoes fatty acid acylation in vitro.

== Gene ==
The CABP2 gene comprises 6 exons, spanning approximately 5 kb, and is situated on chromosome 11q13.1.

== Function ==
CaBP2 involves in calcium signaling and regulation. Specifically, CaBP2 is known for its ability to bind calcium ions, acting as a calcium sensor within cells. This interaction with calcium plays a crucial role in various cellular processes, including neurotransmitter release in neurons and modulation of ion channels. CaBP2 is found in the retina and plays a significant role in visual signal processing. It interacts with other proteins, including those involved in the phototransduction cascade, contributing to the regulation of calcium levels in response to light stimuli.

== Clinical significance ==
Moreover, The CaBP2 protein is highly expressed in the cochlea. Non-syndromic autosomal recessive hearing impairment DFNB93, caused by defects in the CABP2 gene. Genetic defects in CABP2 may result in moderate to severe sensorineural hearing impairment.

As of 2021, CaBP2-related non-syndromic hearing impairment has been reported in only a few families worldwide, including those in Iran, Turkey, Pakistan, Italy, and Denmark.
