= MIR96 =

Non-coding RNA in the species Homo sapiens

Identifiers
- Aliases: MIR96, DFNA50, MIRN96, hsa-mir-96, miR-96, miRNA96, microRNA 96
- External IDs: OMIM: 611606; GeneCards: MIR96; OMA:MIR96 - orthologs

Gene location (Human)
| Chr. | Chromosome 7 (human) |
| Band | 7q32.2 | Start | 129,774,692 bp |
| Band | 7q32.2 | End | 129,774,769 bp |
RNA expression pattern
| Bgee | Human / Mouse (ortholog); Top expressed in: monocyte; lung; blood; endometrium; skin of abdomen; left ovary; pituitary gland; cerebellar hemisphere; right frontal lobe; placenta / n/a; More reference expression data |
| BioGPS | n/a |
Orthologs
| Species | Human | Mouse |
| Entrez | 407053 | n/a |
| Ensembl | ENSG00000199158 | n/a |
| UniProt | n a | n/a |
| RefSeq (mRNA) | n/a | n/a |
| RefSeq (protein) | n/a | n/a |
| Location (UCSC) | Chr 7: 129.77 – 129.77 Mb | n/a |
| PubMed search | | n/a |
- Wikidata
| View/Edit Human |

MicroRNA 96 is a miRNA that in humans is encoded by the MIR96 gene. It's a human variant of mir-96 microRNA.

== Function ==
microRNAs (miRNAs) are short (20-24 nt) non-coding RNAs that are involved in post-transcriptional regulation of gene expression in multicellular organisms by affecting both the stability and translation of mRNAs. miRNAs are transcribed by RNA polymerase II as part of capped and polyadenylated primary transcripts (pri-miRNAs) that can be either protein-coding or non-coding. The primary transcript is cleaved by the Drosha ribonuclease III enzyme to produce an approximately 70-nt stem-loop precursor miRNA (pre-miRNA), which is further cleaved by the cytoplasmic Dicer ribonuclease to generate the mature miRNA and antisense miRNA star (miRNA*) products. The mature miRNA is incorporated into a RNA-induced silencing complex (RISC), which recognizes target mRNAs through imperfect base pairing with the miRNA and most commonly results in translational inhibition or destabilization of the target mRNA. The RefSeq represents the predicted microRNA stem-loop.
