= Otoancorin =

Mammalian protein found in Homo sapiens

OTOA

Identifiers
- Aliases: OTOA, CT108, DFNB22, otoancorin
- External IDs: OMIM: 607038; MGI: 2149209; HomoloGene: 71803; GeneCards: OTOA; OMA:OTOA - orthologs

Gene location (Human)
Chr.	Chromosome 16 (human)
Band	16p12.2|16p12.2	Start	21,663,968 bp
Band	16p12.2|16p12.2	End	21,761,935 bp

Gene location (Mouse)
Chr.	Chromosome 7 (mouse)
Band	7|7 F2	Start	120,680,873 bp
Band	7|7 F2	End	120,762,320 bp
RNA expression pattern
Bgee	Human / Mouse (ortholog); Top expressed in: gonad; left testis; right testis; spleen; prefrontal cortex; primary visual cortex; bone marrow; lymph node; superior frontal gyrus; Brodmann area 9 / Top expressed in: vestibular sensory epithelium; vestibular membrane of cochlear duct; utricle; lumbar spinal ganglion; saccule; zygote; secondary oocyte; morula; cochlea; primary oocyte; More reference expression data
BioGPS	n/a
Orthologs
Species	Human	Mouse
Entrez	146183	246190
Ensembl	ENSG00000155719	ENSMUSG00000034990
UniProt	Q7RTW8	Q8K561
RefSeq (mRNA)	NM_001161683; NM_144672; NM_170664	NM_139310
RefSeq (protein)	NP_001155155; NP_653273; NP_733764	NP_647471
Location (UCSC)	Chr 16: 21.66 – 21.76 Mb	Chr 7: 120.68 – 120.76 Mb
PubMed search
- Wikidata
View/Edit Human	View/Edit Mouse

Otoancorin is a protein found in the vertebrate inner ear, on the sensory epithelia where it connects to the gel matrix.

Otoancorin is found in the cochlea, utricule, saccule, and under the cupulae on the surface of apical dells in the sensory epithelia.

In humans the gene that encodes otoancorin is called OTOA. It is on chromosome 16p12.2 and contains 28 exons. A recessive mutation in this gene called IVS12+2T>C results in deafness. The human protein has 1,153 amino acids.

In the mouse, this protein has 1088 amino acids. In mice otoancorin is needed to attach the tectorial membrane to the inner hair cells in the cochlea.
