= CCDC50 =

Protein-coding gene in humans

Identifiers
- Aliases: CCDC50, C3orf6, DFNA44, YMER, coiled-coil domain containing 50
- External IDs: OMIM: 611051; MGI: 1914751; HomoloGene: 32655; GeneCards: CCDC50; OMA:CCDC50 - orthologs

Gene location (Human)
Chr.	Chromosome 3 (human)
Band	3q28	Start	191,329,085 bp
Band	3q28	End	191,398,659 bp

Gene location (Mouse)
Chr.	Chromosome 16 (mouse)
Band	16 B2|16 18.98 cM	Start	27,207,619 bp
Band	16 B2|16 18.98 cM	End	27,270,968 bp
RNA expression pattern
Bgee	Human / Mouse (ortholog); Top expressed in: mucosa of ileum; Achilles tendon; skin of arm; smooth muscle tissue; tibialis anterior muscle; cardiac muscle tissue of right atrium; sperm; adipose tissue; myocardium of left ventricle; pancreatic epithelial cell / Top expressed in: tail of embryo; genital tubercle; molar; renal corpuscle; medullary collecting duct; vestibular sensory epithelium; extensor digitorum longus muscle; aortic valve; ascending aorta; vestibular membrane of cochlear duct; More reference expression data
BioGPS	n/a
Gene ontology
Molecular function	protein binding; ubiquitin protein ligase binding
Cellular component	cytoplasm; cytosol
Biological process	hearing
Sources:Amigo / QuickGO
Orthologs
Species	Human	Mouse
Entrez	152137	67501
Ensembl	ENSG00000152492	ENSMUSG00000038127
UniProt	Q8IVM0	Q810U5
RefSeq (mRNA)	NM_174908; NM_178335	NM_001025615; NM_001289436; NM_026202
RefSeq (protein)	NP_777568; NP_848018	NP_001020786; NP_001276365; NP_080478
Location (UCSC)	Chr 3: 191.33 – 191.4 Mb	Chr 16: 27.21 – 27.27 Mb
PubMed search
- Wikidata
View/Edit Human	View/Edit Mouse

Coiled-coil domain-containing protein 50 is a protein that in humans is encoded by the CCDC50 gene.
