= Cellular Signalling =

- Discipline: Cell signalling
- Language: English
- Edited by: George S. Baillie

Publication details
- History: 1989–present
- Publisher: Elsevier
- Frequency: Monthly
- Impact factor: 3.937 (2016)

Standard abbreviations
- ISO 4: Cell. Signal.

Indexing
- CODEN: CESIEY
- ISSN: 0898-6568 (print); 1873-3913 (web)
- OCLC no.: 17868798

Links
- Journal homepage; Online access

Cellular Signalling is a peer-reviewed scientific journal focusing on various aspects of cell signalling.

== Abstracting and indexing ==
Cellular Signalling is abstracted and indexed in:

- BIOBASE
- BIOSIS
- Biological Abstracts
- Cambridge Scientific Abstracts
- Chemical Abstracts
- Current Contents/Life Sciences
- EMBASE
- EMBiology
- Elsevier BIOBASE/Current Awareness in Biological Sciences
- Genetics Abstracts
- MEDLINE
- Science Citation Index
- Scopus

According to the Journal Citation Reports, the journal has a 2010 impact factor of 4.243.
