= Eyes absent homolog 4 =

Protein-coding gene in the species Homo sapiens

EYA4

Identifiers
- Aliases: EYA4, CMD1J, DFNA10, EYA transcriptional coactivator and phosphatase 4
- External IDs: OMIM: 603550; MGI: 1337104; GeneCards: EYA4
Enzyme activity
EC #	BRENDA	ExPASy	KEGG	MetaCyc
3.1.3.48	↗	↗	↗	↗

Gene location (Human)
Chr.	Chromosome 6 (human)
Band	6q23.2	Start	133,240,514 bp
Band	6q23.2	End	133,532,128 bp

Gene location (Mouse)
Chr.	Chromosome 10 (mouse)
Band	10 A3|10 10.44 cM	Start	23,102,963 bp
Band	10 A3|10 10.44 cM	End	23,350,786 bp
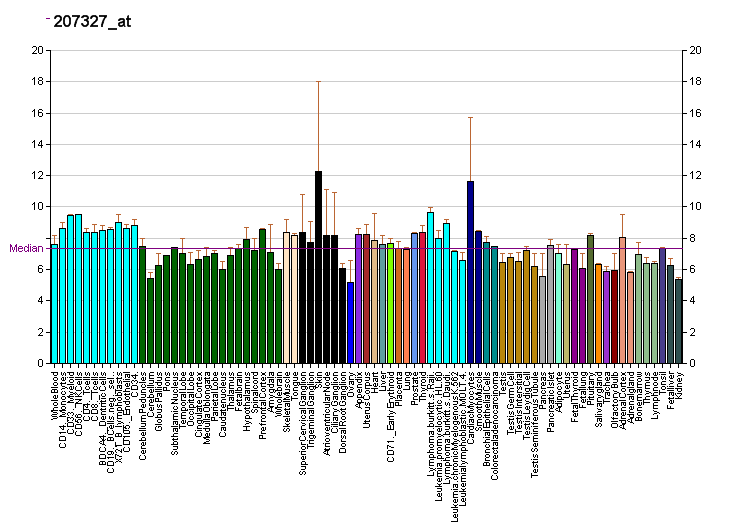
RNA expression pattern
Bgee	Human / Mouse (ortholog); Top expressed in: biceps brachii; Skeletal muscle tissue of biceps brachii; seminal vesicula; gastrocnemius muscle; Achilles tendon; Skeletal muscle tissue of rectus abdominis; mucosa of paranasal sinus; muscle of thigh; bronchial epithelial cell; right ventricle / Top expressed in: vestibular sensory epithelium; vestibular membrane of cochlear duct; olfactory epithelium; triceps brachii muscle; spermatid; sternocleidomastoid muscle; body of femur; temporal muscle; ankle; muscle of thigh; More reference expression data
BioGPS	More reference expression data
Gene ontology
Molecular function	protein binding; phosphoprotein phosphatase activity; hydrolase activity; metal ion binding; protein tyrosine phosphatase activity
Cellular component	cytoplasm; nucleus
Biological process	multicellular organism development; anatomical structure morphogenesis; peptidyl-tyrosine dephosphorylation; regulation of transcription, DNA-templated; hearing; DNA repair; transcription, DNA-templated; visual perception; cellular response to DNA damage stimulus; positive regulation of DNA repair; negative regulation of extrinsic apoptotic signaling pathway in absence of ligand; cell differentiation; chromatin organization; anatomical structure development
Sources:Amigo / QuickGO
Orthologs
Databases	NCBI: entry; OMA: entry
Species	Human	Mouse
Entrez	2070	14051
Ensembl	ENSG00000112319	ENSMUSG00000010461
UniProt	O95677	Q9Z191
RefSeq (mRNA)	NM_001301012; NM_001301013; NM_004100; NM_172103; NM_172104 NM_172105; NM_001370458; NM_001370459	NM_010167; NM_001347372
RefSeq (protein)	NP_001287941; NP_001287942; NP_004091; NP_742101; NP_742103 NP_001357387; NP_001357388	NP_001334301; NP_034297
Location (UCSC)	Chr 6: 133.24 – 133.53 Mb	Chr 10: 23.1 – 23.35 Mb
PubMed search
- Wikidata
View/Edit Human	View/Edit Mouse

Eyes absent homolog 4 is a protein that in humans is encoded by the EYA4 gene.

This gene encodes a member of the eyes absent (EYA) subfamily of proteins. The encoded protein may act as a transcriptional activator and be important for continued function of the mature organ of Corti. Mutations in this gene are associated with postlingual, progressive, autosomal dominant hearing loss at the deafness, autosomal dominant nonsyndromic sensorineural 10 locus. Three transcript variants encoding distinct isoforms have been identified for this gene.
