= LHFPL5 =

Protein-coding gene in the species Homo sapiens

Identifiers
- Aliases: LHFPL5, DFNB67, TMHS, dJ510O8.8, lipoma HMGIC fusion partner-like 5, LHFPL tetraspan subfamily member 5
- External IDs: OMIM: 609427; MGI: 1915382; GeneCards: LHFPL5

Gene location (Human)
| Chr. | Chromosome 6 (human) |
| Band | 6p21.31 | Start | 35,797,206 bp |
| Band | 6p21.31 | End | 35,845,397 bp |

Gene location (Mouse)
| Chr. | Chromosome 17 (mouse) |
| Band | 17 A3.3|17 14.77 cM | Start | 28,794,615 bp |
| Band | 17 A3.3|17 14.77 cM | End | 28,804,653 bp |
RNA expression pattern
| Bgee | Human / Mouse (ortholog); Top expressed in: body of pancreas; testicle; epithelium of colon; bone marrow cell; skin of abdomen; skin of leg; Brodmann area 9; anterior cingulate cortex; right frontal lobe; blood / Top expressed in: otolith organ; utricle; facial motor nucleus; lumbar spinal ganglion; vestibular sensory epithelium; arcuate nucleus; dorsomedial hypothalamic nucleus; supraoptic nucleus; median eminence; pontine nuclei; More reference expression data |
| BioGPS | n/a |
Gene ontology
| Molecular function | protein binding |
| Cellular component | stereocilium bundle; integral component of membrane; plasma membrane; apical plasma membrane; stereocilium tip; membrane |
| Biological process | auditory receptor cell stereocilium organization; ion transport; hearing; detection of mechanical stimulus involved in sensory perception of sound |
Sources:Amigo / QuickGO
Orthologs
| Databases | NCBI: entry; OMA: entry |
| Species | Human | Mouse |
| Entrez | 222662 | 328789 |
| Ensembl | ENSG00000197753 | ENSMUSG00000062252 |
| UniProt | Q8TAF8 | Q4KL25 |
| RefSeq (mRNA) | NM_182548 | NM_026571 |
| RefSeq (protein) | NP_872354 | NP_080847 |
| Location (UCSC) | Chr 6: 35.8 – 35.85 Mb | Chr 17: 28.79 – 28.8 Mb |
| PubMed search |
- Wikidata
| View/Edit Human | View/Edit Mouse |

Lipoma HMGIC fusion partner-like 5 is a protein that in humans is encoded by the LHFPL5 gene.

== Function ==
This gene is a member of the lipoma HMGIC fusion partner (LHFP) gene family, which is a subset of the superfamily of tetraspan transmembrane protein encoding genes. Mutations in this gene result in deafness in humans, and a mutation in a similar gene in mice results in deafness and vestibular dysfunction with severe degeneration of the organ of Corti. It is proposed to function in hair bundle morphogenesis.
