= TMC2 =

Protein-coding gene in the species Homo sapiens

Identifiers
- Aliases: TMC2, C20orf145, dJ686C3.3, transmembrane channel like 2
- External IDs: OMIM: 606707; MGI: 2151017; GeneCards: TMC2

Gene location (Human)
Chr.	Chromosome 20 (human)
Band	20p13	Start	2,536,573 bp
Band	20p13	End	2,643,580 bp

Gene location (Mouse)
Chr.	Chromosome 2 (mouse)
Band	2|2 F1	Start	130,037,114 bp
Band	2|2 F1	End	130,106,365 bp
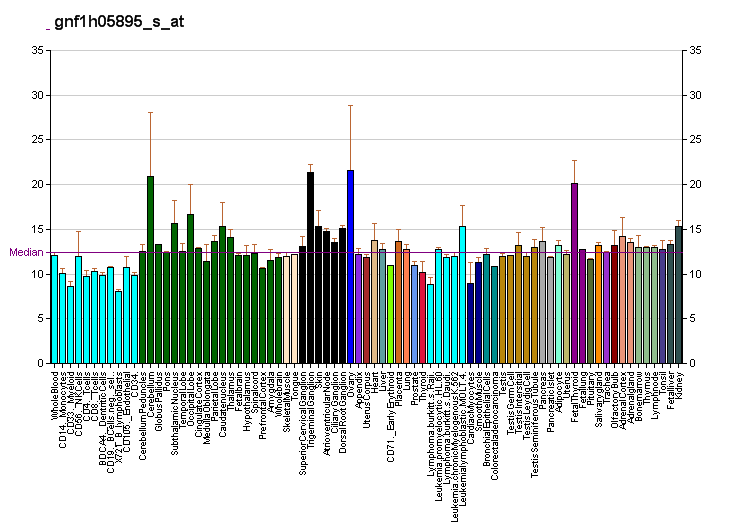
RNA expression pattern
Bgee	Human / Mouse (ortholog); Top expressed in: cerebellar hemisphere; right hemisphere of cerebellum; anterior pituitary; hypothalamus; nucleus accumbens; ganglionic eminence; right lung; amygdala; right frontal lobe; caudate nucleus / Top expressed in: ampullary crest; morula; macula of utricle; zygote; blastocyst; bone; cranium; neurocranium; chondrocranium; petrous part of the temporal bone; More reference expression data
BioGPS	More reference expression data
Gene ontology
Molecular function	voltage-gated calcium channel activity; mechanosensitive ion channel activity; molecular function; ion channel activity
Cellular component	membrane; stereocilium tip; integral component of membrane; plasma membrane; cellular component; integral component of plasma membrane
Biological process	ion transport; vestibular reflex; calcium ion transmembrane transport; regulation of calcium ion transmembrane transport; detection of mechanical stimulus involved in sensory perception of sound
Sources:Amigo / QuickGO
Orthologs
Databases	NCBI: entry; OMA: entry
Species	Human	Mouse
Entrez	117532	192140
Ensembl	ENSG00000149488	ENSMUSG00000060332
UniProt	Q8TDI7	Q8R4P4
RefSeq (mRNA)	NM_080751	NM_138655
RefSeq (protein)	NP_542789	NP_619596
Location (UCSC)	Chr 20: 2.54 – 2.64 Mb	Chr 2: 130.04 – 130.11 Mb
PubMed search
- Wikidata
View/Edit Human	View/Edit Mouse

Transmembrane channel-like protein 2 is a protein that in humans is encoded by the TMC2 gene.

== Function ==
This gene is considered a member of a gene family predicted to encode transmembrane proteins. The specific function of this gene is unknown; however, expression in the inner ear suggests that it may be crucial for normal auditory function.

== Clinical significance ==
Mutations in this gene may underlie hereditary disorders of balance and hearing.
