= Espin (protein) =

Human protein

ESPN

Identifiers
- Aliases: ESPN, DFNB36, LP2654, Espin, USH1M
- External IDs: OMIM: 606351; MGI: 1861630; GeneCards: ESPN

Gene location (Human)
Chr.	Chromosome 1 (human)
Band	1p36.31	Start	6,424,776 bp
Band	1p36.31	End	6,461,367 bp

Gene location (Mouse)
Chr.	Chromosome 4 (mouse)
Band	4 E2|4 82.9 cM	Start	152,204,788 bp
Band	4 E2|4 82.9 cM	End	152,236,828 bp
RNA expression pattern
Bgee	Human / Mouse (ortholog); Top expressed in: right testis; left testis; right uterine tube; right lobe of liver; mucosa of transverse colon; skin of abdomen; skin of leg; mucosa of ileum; olfactory zone of nasal mucosa; human kidney / Top expressed in: interventricular septum; intestinal villus; yolk sac; otic vesicle; right kidney; neural layer of retina; ileum; duodenum; jejunum; saccule; More reference expression data
BioGPS	n/a
Gene ontology
Molecular function	SH3 domain binding; actin binding; actin filament binding
Cellular component	microvillus; cell projection; cytoskeleton; stereocilium; cytoplasm; filamentous actin; brush border; stereocilium tip; actin cytoskeleton; stereocilium bundle
Biological process	hearing; actin filament bundle assembly; locomotory behavior; parallel actin filament bundle assembly; positive regulation of filopodium assembly; negative regulation of cytoskeleton organization
Sources:Amigo / QuickGO
Orthologs
Databases	NCBI: entry; OMA: entry
Species	Human	Mouse
Entrez	83715	56226
Ensembl	ENSG00000187017	ENSMUSG00000028943
UniProt	Q5JYL1	Q9ET47
RefSeq (mRNA)	NM_031475; NM_001367473; NM_001367474	NM_019585; NM_207687; NM_207688; NM_207689; NM_207690 NM_207691
RefSeq (protein)	NP_113663; NP_001354402; NP_001354403	NP_062531; NP_997570; NP_997571; NP_997572; NP_997573 NP_997574
Location (UCSC)	Chr 1: 6.42 – 6.46 Mb	Chr 4: 152.2 – 152.24 Mb
PubMed search
- Wikidata
View/Edit Human	View/Edit Mouse

Espin, also known as autosomal recessive deafness type 36 protein or ectoplasmic specialization protein, is a protein that in humans is encoded by the ESPN gene. Espin is a microfilament binding protein.

== Function ==
Espin is a multifunctional actin-bundling protein. It plays a major role in regulating the organization, dimensions, dynamics, and signaling capacities of the actin filament-rich, microvillus-type specializations that mediate sensory transduction in various mechanosensory and chemosensory cells.

== Clinical significance ==
Mutations in this gene are associated with autosomal recessive neurosensory deafness, autosomal dominant sensorineural deafness without vestibular involvement, and DFNB36.
