= GJB2 =

Protein-coding gene in the species Homo sapiens

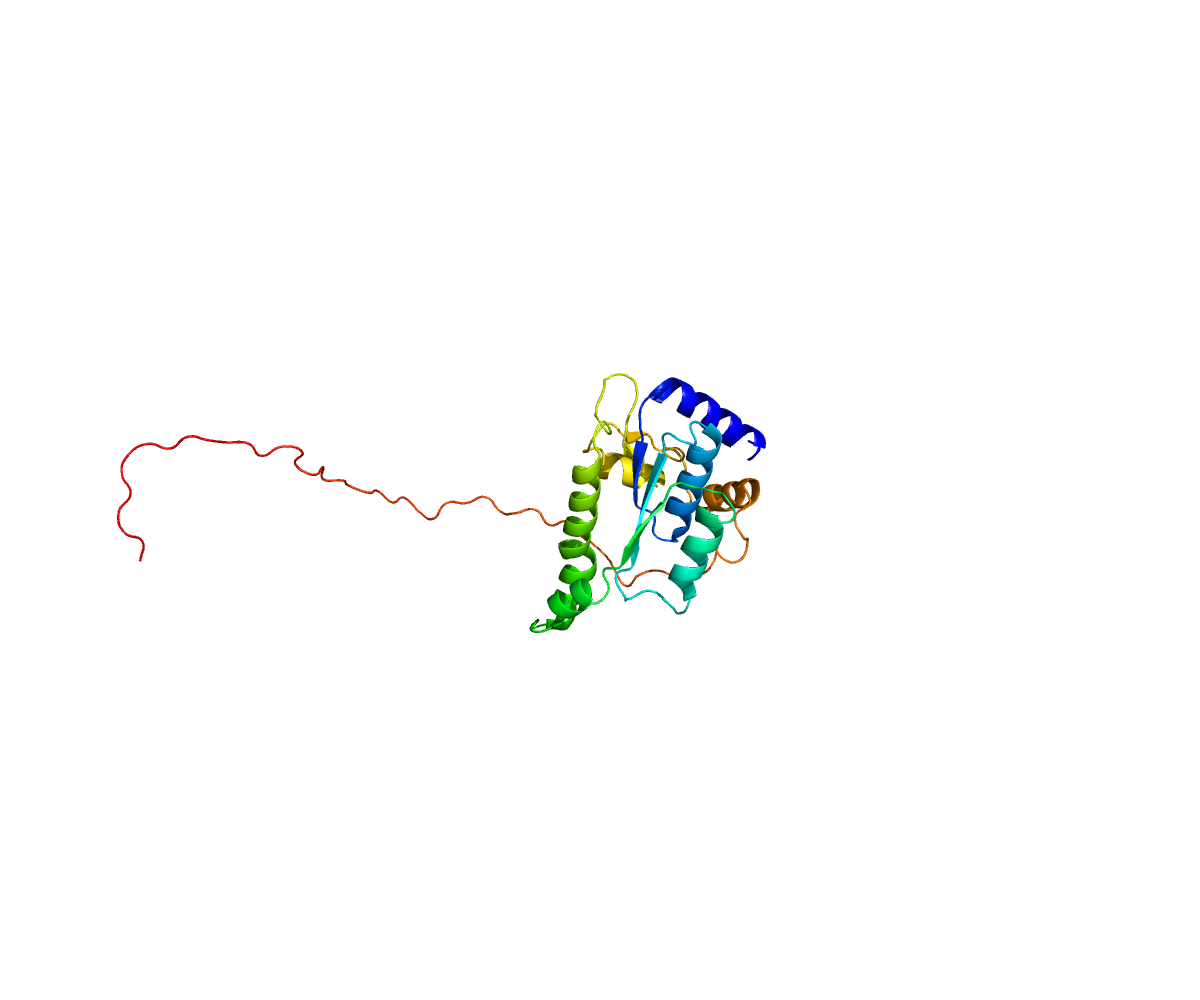

Identifiers
- Aliases: GJB2, CX26, DFNA3, DFNA3A, DFNB1, DFNB1A, HID, KID, NSRD1, PPK, gap junction protein beta 2, BAPS
- External IDs: OMIM: 121011; MGI: 95720; GeneCards: GJB2
Available structures
PDB	Ortholog search: PDBe RCSB
PDB	List of PDB id codes 2ZW3, 3IZ1, 3IZ2, 5ERA, 5ER7

Gene location (Human)
Chr.	Chromosome 13 (human)
Band	13q12.11	Start	20,187,463 bp
Band	13q12.11	End	20,192,938 bp

Gene location (Mouse)
Chr.	Chromosome 14 (mouse)
Band	14 C3|14 30.1 cM	Start	57,336,057 bp
Band	14 C3|14 30.1 cM	End	57,342,159 bp
RNA expression pattern
Bgee	Human / Mouse (ortholog); Top expressed in: gingival epithelium; human penis; mucosa of pharynx; skin of arm; body of tongue; oral cavity; vulva; skin of thigh; pancreatic ductal cell; skin of abdomen / Top expressed in: stria vascularis; hair follicle; meninges; superior surface of tongue; utricle; left lobe of liver; vestibular membrane of cochlear duct; cervix; lactiferous gland; lip; More reference expression data
BioGPS	n/a
Gene ontology
Molecular function	identical protein binding; gap junction channel activity; calcium ion binding; metal ion binding
Cellular component	integral component of membrane; connexin complex; membrane; plasma membrane; cell junction; gap junction; endoplasmic reticulum-Golgi intermediate compartment; cytoplasm; cytosol; lateral plasma membrane; cell body; perinuclear region of cytoplasm; astrocyte projection; integral component of plasma membrane
Biological process	hearing; cell communication; cell-cell signaling; gap junction assembly; response to ischemia; female pregnancy; ageing; response to estradiol; response to lipopolysaccharide; response to retinoic acid; response to progesterone; cellular response to oxidative stress; response to human chorionic gonadotropin; response to antibiotic; decidualization; inner ear development; transmembrane transport; cellular response to glucagon stimulus; cellular response to dexamethasone stimulus; epididymis development; gap junction-mediated intercellular transport
Sources:Amigo / QuickGO
Orthologs
Databases	NCBI: entry; OMA: entry
Species	Human	Mouse
Entrez	2706	14619
Ensembl	ENSG00000165474	ENSMUSG00000046352
UniProt	P29033	Q00977
RefSeq (mRNA)	NM_004004	NM_008125
RefSeq (protein)	NP_003995	NP_032151
Location (UCSC)	Chr 13: 20.19 – 20.19 Mb	Chr 14: 57.34 – 57.34 Mb
PubMed search
- Wikidata
View/Edit Human	View/Edit Mouse

Gap junction beta-2 protein (GJB2), also known as connexin 26 (Cx26) — is a protein that in humans is encoded by the GJB2 gene.

== Function ==
Gap junctions were first characterized by electron microscopy as regionally specialized structures on plasma membranes of contacting adherent cells. These structures were shown to consist of cell-to-cell channels. Proteins, called connexins, purified from fractions of enriched gap junctions from different tissues differ. The connexins are designated by their molecular mass. Another system of nomenclature divides gap junction proteins into two categories, alpha and beta, according to sequence similarities at the nucleotide and amino acid levels. For example, CX43 (GJA1) is designated alpha-1 gap junction protein, whereas GJB1 (CX32), and GJB2 (CX26; this protein) are called beta-1 and beta-2 gap junction proteins, respectively. This nomenclature emphasizes that GJB1 and GJB2 are more homologous to each other than either of them is to gap junction protein, alpha GJA1.

Gap junction beta-2 protein is a member of the connexin protein family and plays a crucial role in forming gap junctions, which are channels that allow the transport of nutrients, ions, and signaling molecules between adjacent cells. GJB2 is widely expressed throughout the body, with particularly important functions in the inner ear and skin. In the cochlea, GJB2 is believed to be essential for maintaining proper potassium ion levels and for the maturation of certain cochlear cells, both of which are critical for the process of converting sound waves into electrical nerve impulses. In the skin, GJB2 contributes to the growth, maturation, and stability of the epidermis.

== Clinical significance ==
Defects in this gene lead to the most common form of congenital deafness in developed countries, called DFNB1 (also known as connexin 26 deafness or GJB2-related deafness). One fairly common mutation is the deletion of one guanine from a string of six, resulting in a frameshift and termination of the protein at amino acid number 13. Having two copies of this mutation results in deafness.

Connexin 26 also plays a role in tumor suppression through mediation of the cell cycle. The abnormal expression of Cx26, correlated with several types of human cancers, may serve as a prognostic factor for cancers such as colorectal cancer, breast cancer, and bladder cancer. Furthermore, Cx26 over-expression is suggested to promote cancer development by facilitating cell migration and invasion and by stimulating the self-perpetuation ability of cancer stem cells.

== See also ==
- Connexin
- Gap junction
- Vohwinkel syndrome
- Bart–Pumphrey syndrome
