= MARVELD2 =

Protein-coding gene in the species Homo sapiens

Identifiers
- Aliases: MARVELD2, DFNB49, MARVD2, MRVLDC2, Tric, MARVEL domain containing 2
- External IDs: OMIM: 610572; MGI: 2446166; GeneCards: MARVELD2

Gene location (Human)
| Chr. | Chromosome 5 (human) |
| Band | 5q13.2 | Start | 69,415,065 bp |
| Band | 5q13.2 | End | 69,444,330 bp |

Gene location (Mouse)
| Chr. | Chromosome 13 (mouse) |
| Band | 13|13 D1 | Start | 100,732,465 bp |
| Band | 13|13 D1 | End | 100,753,479 bp |
RNA expression pattern
| Bgee | Human / Mouse (ortholog); Top expressed in: islet of Langerhans; gonad; duodenum; liver; rectum; mucosa of transverse colon; testicle; thyroid gland; left lobe of thyroid gland; right lobe of thyroid gland / Top expressed in: otic vesicle; saccule; otic placode; Hindgut; urothelium; conjunctival fornix; medullary collecting duct; Paneth cell; epithelium of small intestine; transitional epithelium of urinary bladder; More reference expression data |
| BioGPS | n/a |
Gene ontology
| Molecular function | protein binding |
| Cellular component | cytoplasm; integral component of membrane; plasma membrane; basolateral plasma membrane; apical plasma membrane; cytoplasmic vesicle; membrane; tricellular tight junction; bicellular tight junction; cell junction; paranodal junction; Schmidt-Lanterman incisure |
| Biological process | establishment of endothelial barrier; cell-cell junction organization; hearing; bicellular tight junction assembly |
Sources:Amigo / QuickGO
Orthologs
| Databases | NCBI: entry; OMA: entry |
| Species | Human | Mouse |
| Entrez | 153562 | 218518 |
| Ensembl | ENSG00000274671; ENSG00000152939 | ENSMUSG00000021636 |
| UniProt | Q8N4S9 | Q3UZP0 |
| RefSeq (mRNA) | NM_001038603; NM_001244734; NM_144724 | NM_001038602; NM_178410 |
| RefSeq (protein) | NP_001033692; NP_001231663 | NP_001033691; NP_848497 |
| Location (UCSC) | Chr 5: 69.42 – 69.44 Mb | Chr 13: 100.73 – 100.75 Mb |
| PubMed search |
- Wikidata
| View/Edit Human | View/Edit Mouse |

MARVEL domain-containing protein 2 is a protein that in humans is encoded by the MARVELD2 gene.
